= Mâconnais =

District in Burgundy, France

Coordinates: 46.34°N 4.74°E

- Wine region
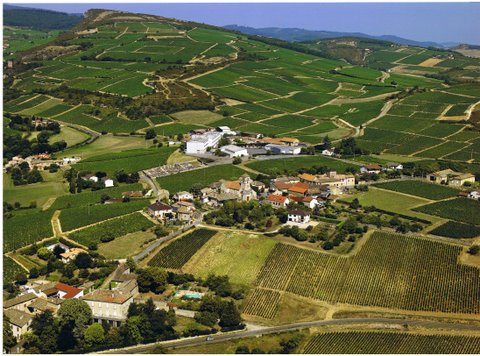
- Country: France
- Part of: Burgundy
- Grapes produced: mostly Chardonnay; also some Gamay and Pinot noir
- Wine produced: Mâcon, Mâcon-Villages, Pouilly-Fuissé, Pouilly-Vinzelles, Pouilly-Loché, Saint-Véran, Viré-Clessé

The Mâconnais (French pronunciation: [makɔnɛ]) district is located in the south of the Burgundy wine region in France, west of the Saône river. It takes its name from the town of Mâcon. It is best known as a source of good value white wines made from the Chardonnay grape; the wines from Pouilly-Fuissé are particularly sought after. Almost all the wine made in the Mâconnais is white wine. Chardonnay is the main grape grown in the district—in fact, there is a village of that name in the far north of the region. Some plantations of Gamay and Pinot noir are made into red and rosé Mâcon, making up no more than 30% of the total wine production. Gamay is grown in the Beaujolais cru of Moulin-à-Vent, which extends into the Mâconnais, but has little in common with the wines north of the border.

== Geography ==
The geology is similar to that of the Côte d'Or, but the gentle relief means that vines are mixed with other forms of farming in most of the area. In the south the land rises up to form Mont de Pouilly and other limestone hills, covered in the alkaline clay that best suits Chardonnay. The villages of Vergisson, Solutré-Pouilly, Fuissé and Chaintré shelter at their feet, and are home to the best wines of the region.

== History ==
Mâcon was a major crossroads in Roman times, and grapes would have been brought by the Romans if they were not already cultivated by the Celts. Viticulture was further encouraged by local religious foundations; the province was dominated by the bishopric of Mâcon during the Dark Ages.

The region formed the border between the Kingdom of France and the Holy Roman Empire from 843 to 1600 and grew rich on customs duties in that time. A secular Count of Mâcon is not recorded until after 850; from 926 the countship became hereditary. The last Count of Mâcon and of Vienne died in 1224 and the lands passed to his daughter, Alix de Bourgogne (Alice of Burgundy); when her husband died in 1239, she sold the Mâconnais to Louis IX of France. The 1435 Treaty of Arras saw Charles VII of France cede it to Philip, Duke of Burgundy, but in 1477 it reverted to France, upon the death of duke Charles the Bold. Emperor Charles V definitively recognized the Mâconnais as French at the Treaty of Cambrai in 1529.

After the fall of the Bastille in 1789, the mountain peasants of Mâconnais revolted. Many were executed by the urban militias of Mâcon, Cluny and Tournus after much brigandage.

== Appellations ==
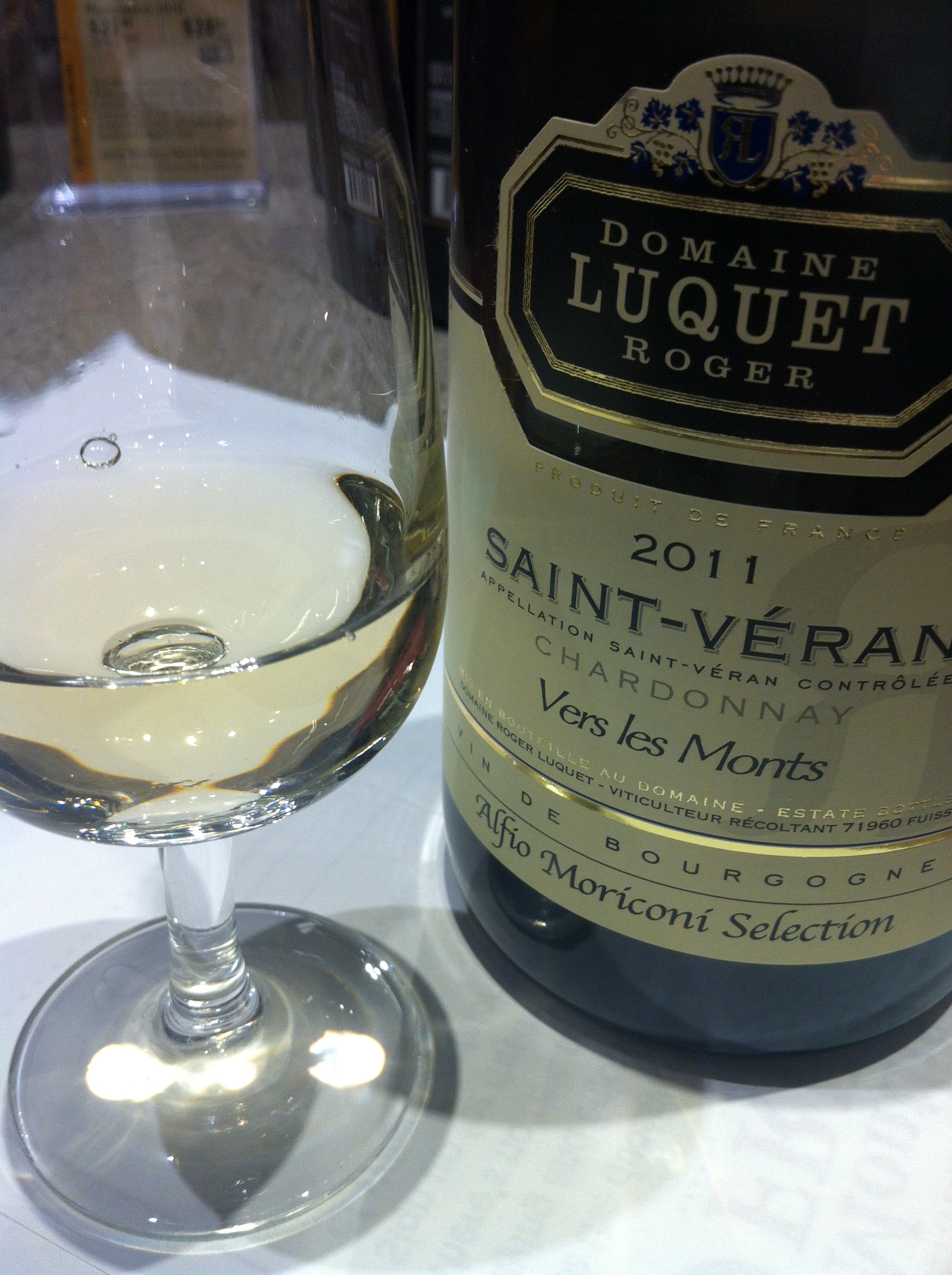
A Chardonnay from Saint-Véran.

Mâconnais consists of the following appellations. The regional Burgundy appellations - Bourgogne, Bourgogne Aligoté, Coteaux Bourguignons, Bourgogne Passe-tout-grains, Crémant de Bourgogne, Bourgogne mousseux - may also be used for wine from this area.

- Mâcon is the basic appellation, that can be used for white, rosé and red wines.
- Mâcon-Villages, only for white wines.
- Mâcon + village name, such as Mâcon-Prissé and Mâcon-Milly-Lamartine. For white Mâcon, all the names of the following villages/communes are allowed to be appended, with those marked "(r)" also allowed to produce red and rosé Mâcon under their name: Azé (r), Bray (r), Burgy (r), Bussières (r), Chaintré (r), Chardonnay (r), Charnay-lès-Mâcon (r), Cruzille (r), Davayé (r), Fuissé, Igé (r), La Roche-Vineuse (r), Loché, Lugny (r), Mancey (r), Milly-Lamartine (r), Montbellet, Péronne (r), Pierreclos (r), Prissé (r), Saint-Gengoux-le-National (r), Solutré-Pouilly, Uchizy, Vergisson, Verzé (r), Vinzelles. The following village/commune is allowed to be appended for red and rosé Mâcon only: Serrières.
- Pouilly-Fuissé, a white wine appellation with the two junior partners Pouilly-Loché and Pouilly-Vinzelles.
- Saint-Véran, a white wine appellation which covers most of the Chardonnay vineyards that used to make white Beaujolais, in the commune of Saint-Vérand. Saint-Véran and white Beaujolais may be regarded as southern extensions of the Mâconnais.
- Viré-Clessé, an appellation for white wine that was created from the former Mâcon-Viré and Mâcon-Clessé

== Appellation regulations ==
The following rules apply to the different wines from the Mâcon appellation:

- White Mâcon: Chardonnay only, allowed base yield is 60 hectoliter per hectare and the grapes must reach a maturity of at least 10.0 per cent potential alcohol.
- Red and rosé Mâcon: Pinot noir and Gamay in any proportion, allowed base yield is 55 hectoliter per hectare and the grapes must reach a maturity of at least 10.0 per cent potential alcohol.
- Mâcon-Villages: Chardonnay only, allowed base yield is 58 hectoliter per hectare and the grapes must reach a maturity of at least 10.5 per cent potential alcohol.
- White Mâcon + village name: Chardonnay only, allowed base yield is 57 hectoliter per hectare and the grapes must reach a maturity of at least 11.0 per cent potential alcohol.
- Red and rosé Mâcon + village name: Gamay only, allowed base yield is 50 hectoliter per hectare and the grapes must reach a maturity of at least 10.5 per cent potential alcohol.

== Production ==
In 2010, the total Mâconnais vineyards covered 6,991 hectares (17,280 acres). Of this, 5,779.7 hectares (14,282 acres) of vineyard surface was in production for the specific appellations of the Mâconnais, and some 1,211 hectares (2,990 acres) for regional Burgundy appellations. In the Mâconnais appellations, 342 648 hectoliters of wine were produced, of which 316 725 hl of white wine and 25 933 of rosé and red wine. This corresponds to 45.7 million bottles of wine, of which 42.2 million bottles of white and 3.5 million bottles of red. The production was distributed as follows:

- Mâcon appellations: 3,833.07 hectares (9,471.7 acres), 236 880 hl wine, of which 210 947 hl white and 25 933 hl rosé/red, corresponding to 31.6 million bottles, of which 28.1 million bottles of white wine and 3.5 million bottles of rosé and red wine.
  - Mâcon AOC: 384.86 hectares (951.0 acres), 21 578 hl wine, of which 16 735 hl rosé/red and 4 843 hl white.
  - Mâcon-Villages: 1,876.31 hectares (4,636.5 acres), 119 998 hl wine.
  - Mâcon + village/commune name: 1,571.9 hectares (3,884 acres), 95 304 hl wine, of which 86 106 hl white and 9 198 hl rosé/red.
- Pouilly-Fuissé: 760.62 hectares (1,879.5 acres), 38 794 hl wine.
- Pouilly-Loché: 31.95 hectares (79.0 acres), 1 533 hl wine.
- Pouilly-Vinzelles: 54.25 hectares (134.1 acres), 1 944 hl wine.
- Saint-Véran: 696.55 hectares (1,721.2 acres), 40 283 hl wine.
- Viré-Clessé: 403.26 hectares (996.5 acres), 23 224 hl wine.

== See also ==
- Côte Chalonnaise - the wine district to the north
- Arpitan language
- Mâconnais (dialect)
