= Château de Lugny =

Castle in Saône-et-Loire, France

Coordinates: 46°28′21″N 4°48′27″E

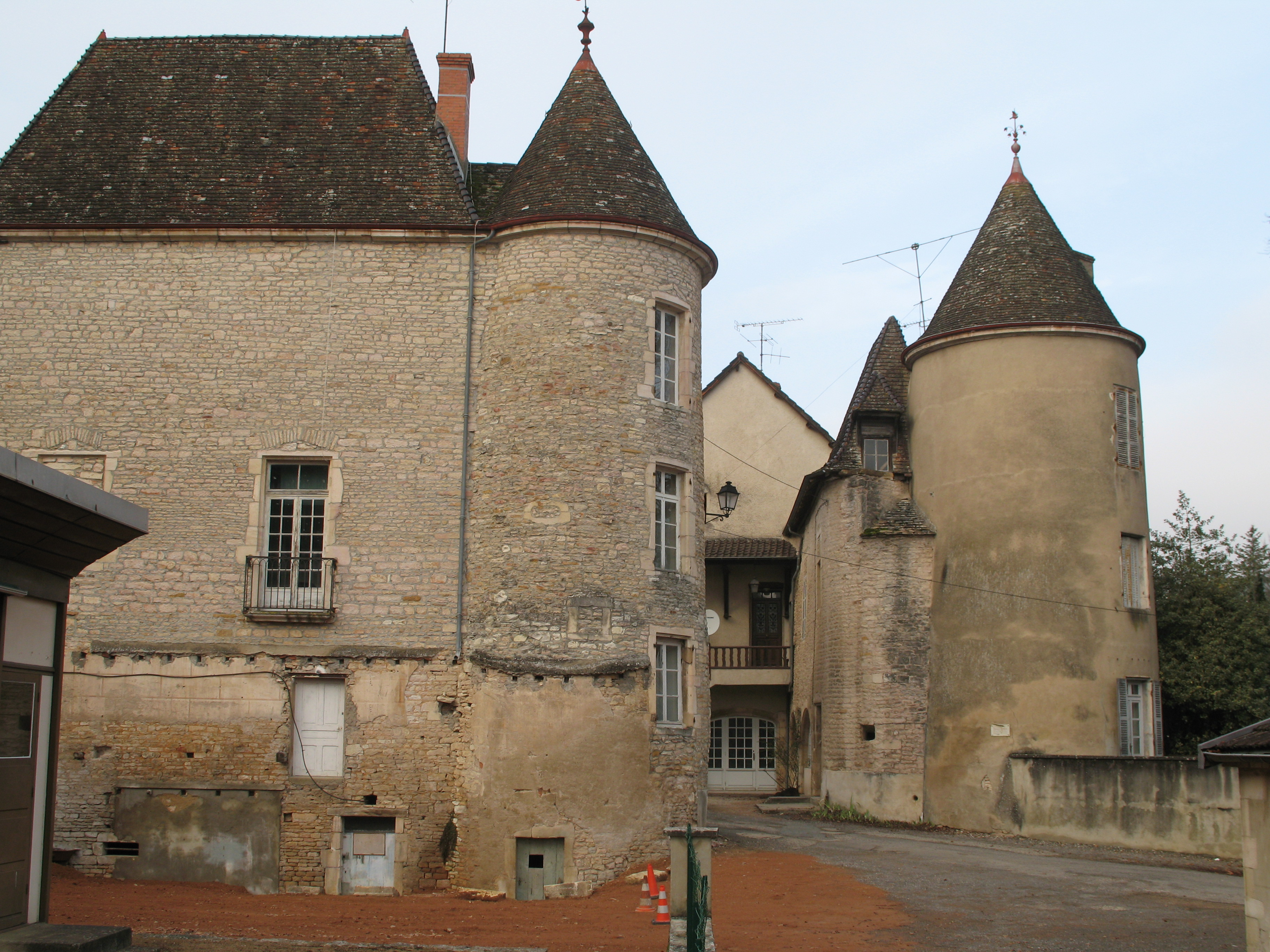
Château de Lugny

The Château de Lugny is a castle in the commune of Lugny in the Saône-et-Loire département of France.

== Description ==
In the Middle Ages, the Château de Lugny, flanked by several towers and equipped with an "extremely high and very beautiful" keep, was surrounded by ditches filled with water from the source of the Bourbonne River - known as the "source des eaux bleues" (blue waters) - which rises at the foot of the castle hill. However, of the imposing castle of the lords of Lugny, burnt down during the French Revolution, there remains today only two round three-storey towers, traditionally dated from the 14th century, and part of the common buildings corresponding essentially to those of the old lower courtyard of the manorial residence and forming a quadrilateral.

To each of the two gate towers a narrow building is joined. These, built perpendicularly one with the other, are covered by high tiled roofs. The building adjoining the north-east tower is a circular turret whose roof is pierced by an attic window dominating the angle between the building and the tower.

Having passed the two gate towers - which originally flanked a gateway with a drawbridge - one discovers on the left three openings to partially walled arcades which were once the former conciergerie.

On the right can be seen two elegant bays and their profiled semicircular arches and the entry to the old castle stables - traditionally dated from the 16th century.

The building in which the lords of Lugny resided was built formerly on the flat land between the present church and the castle hill. Set on fire in July 1789, it almost entirely disappeared and all that remains of this construction is the base of a circular tower and, a few metres away, a small portion of the old wall.

The château is private property and not open to the public.

== History ==
Arms of Lugny

Arms of Chabot

Arms of Saulx

Arms of La Baume

House of Lugny

- Lugny in the Middle Ages was the cradle of a house of chivalry – the House of Lugny – whose motto was : « N’est oyseau de bon nid qui n’a plume de Lugny ». This family died out in the middle of the 16th century with Jean de Lugny and the estate therefore passed successively, through the hands of three families.

House of Chabot

- 1558 : Françoise de Lugny, lady of Lugny, daughter and heir of Jean de Lugny married François Chabot

House of Saulx

- 1579 : Catherine Chabot, lady of Lugny, daughter and heir of the preceding, married Jean de Saulx, Viscount de Tavannes and Viscount de Lugny
- Start of 17th century : Charles de Saulx became Marquis de Lugny

House of La Baume

- 1647 : Claire-Françoise de Saulx, daughter and heir of the preceding, married Charles-François de La Baume, Count of Montrevel, whose family kept the estate until the end of the Ancien Régime
- End of the 17th century : Jacques-Marie de La Baume became Baron de Lugny
- Start of 18th century : Melchior-Esprit de La Baume, son of the preceding, became Baron de Lugny
- 1740 : Florent-Alexandre-Melchior de La Baume (born 1736), Count of Montrevel, son of the preceding, becomes the last lord of Lugny; he was put to death in Paris in 1794.

French Revolution

- 1789, the Château de Lugny, in the 18th century used as a simple hunting lodge by the counts of Montrevel, was the first in the Mâconnais to be burned by the «Brigands» – rebelling peasants – when the troubles of The Terror, at the end of July, stirred up this region (night of Monday 27 and Tuesday 28 July 1789). Dubost, curate of the neighbouring parish of Bissy-la-Mâconnaise wrote « La flamme était si grande entre une et deux heures de la nuit que j’aurais pu lire à ma fenêtre à la lueur du feu. »

More recent

- Having lost their agricultural function after the disasters at the time of the French revolution, the buildings which resisted the fire were used initially for cotton-spinning (first half of the 19th century), and thereafter as successively the gendarmerie and, around 1910, the presbytery (which remained there until the middle of the 1980s).

== See also ==
- List of castles in France

== Bibliography ==
- Lex, Léonce : Notice historique sur Lugny et ses hameaux, Belhomme Libraire Editeur, Mâcon, 1892.
- Lafarge, Frédéric and Berthaud, Paulette : Lugny, mémoire de pierres, mémoire d'hommes, Bibliothèque municipale de Lugny, Lugny, 2006 (I.S.B.N. : 2-9514028-1-3).
- Vignier, Françoise (ed) : Le Guide des Châteaux de France, 71 Saône-et-Loire, Editions Hermé, Paris, 1985.
