= Hurigny =

- Commune
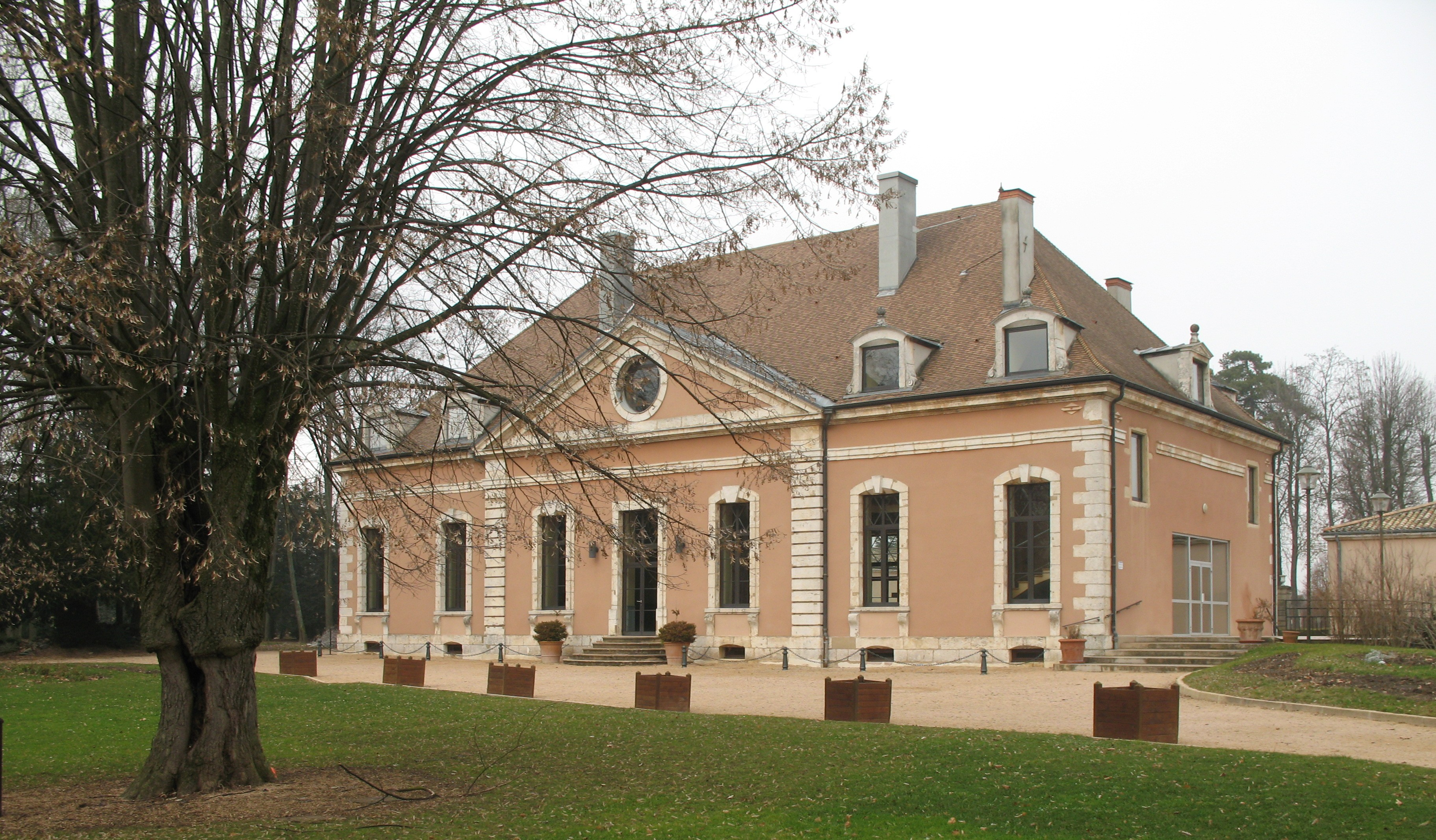
- Chateau

- Coat of arms
- Location of Hurigny
- Location within France Location within Bourgogne-Franche-Comté
- Coordinates: 46°20′56″N 4°47′45″E
- Country: France
- Region: Bourgogne-Franche-Comté
- Department: Saône-et-Loire
- Arrondissement: Mâcon
- Canton: Hurigny
- Intercommunality: Mâconnais Beaujolais Agglomération

Government
  - Mayor (2020–2026): Dominique Deynoux
- Area^{1}: 9.2 km^{2} (3.6 sq mi)
- Elevation: 375 m (1,230 ft)
- Highest elevation: 391 m (1,283 ft)
- Lowest elevation: 222 m (728 ft)
- Population (2023): 1,959
  - Density: 210/km^{2} (550/sq mi)
- Time zone: UTC+01:00 (CET)
  - Summer (DST): UTC+02:00 (CEST)
- INSEE/Postal code: 71235 /71870
- ^{1} French Land Register data, which excludes lakes, ponds, glaciers > 1 km^{2} (0.386 sq mi or 247 acres) and river estuaries.

Hurigny (French pronunciation: [yʁiɲi]) is a commune in the Saône-et-Loire department in the region of Bourgogne-Franche-Comté in eastern France.

== History ==
Hurigny was formerly known as Uriniacum.

In 1471, the troops of King Louis XI destroyed the fortified house of Salornay, whose artillery had been lent to the town of Mâcon to help resist them.

The poet Alphonse de Lamartine stayed many times at the château, which belonged to his uncle, François Louis de Lamartine de Montculot (1750–1827).

In 1862, a decision was made to build a chapel dedicated to Saint Joseph to the north of the church. This required additional space and led to the relocation of the cemetery.

On November 11, 1900, the narrow-gauge railway line from Mâcon to Fleurville via Lugny was inaugurated. The line operated regular passenger service until 1931.

== See also ==
- Communes of the Saône-et-Loire department
