= Cruzille =

- Commune
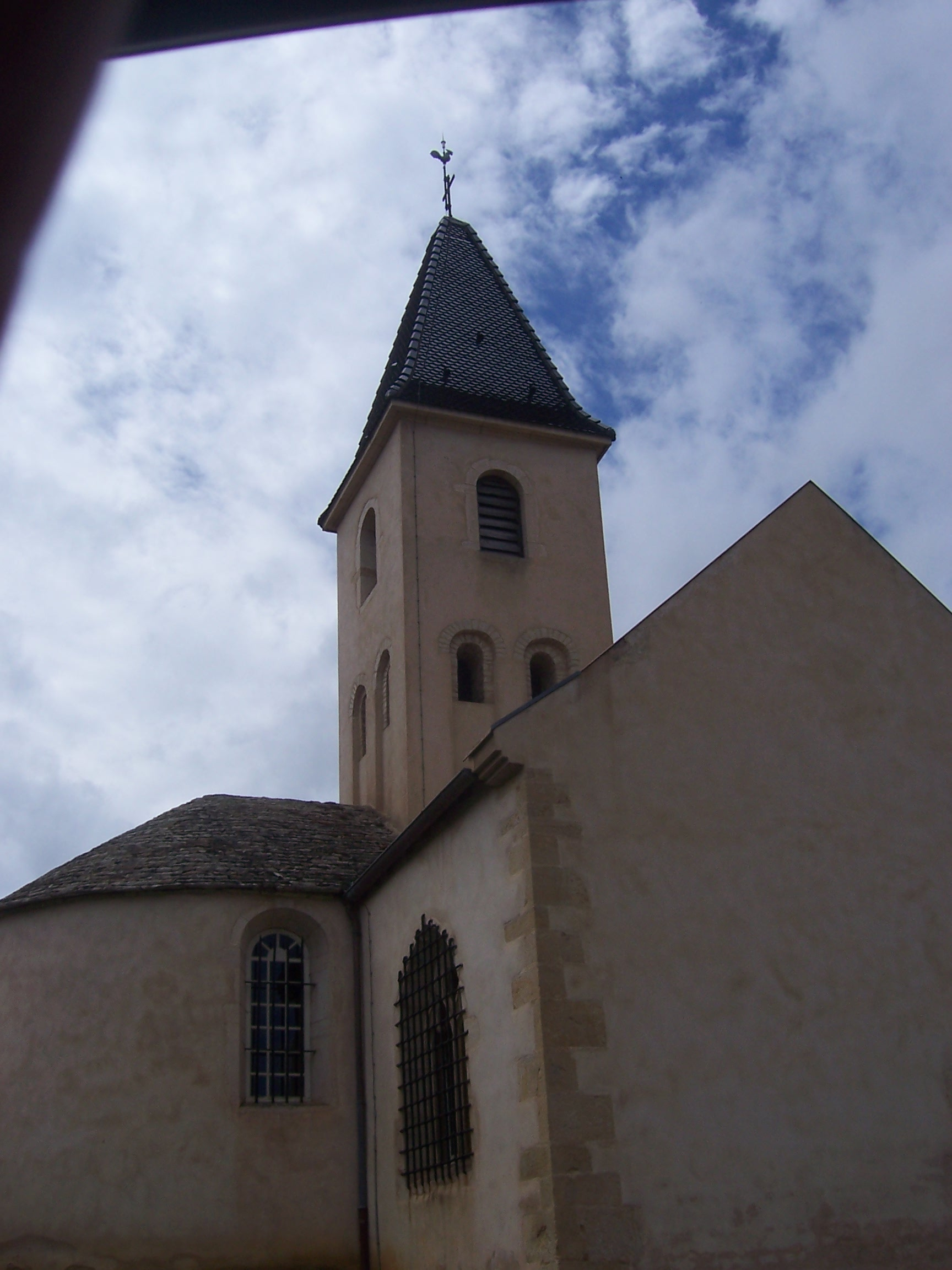
- The church in Cruzille
- Location of Cruzille
- Location within France Location within Bourgogne-Franche-Comté
- Coordinates: 46°30′29″N 4°47′50″E
- Country: France
- Region: Bourgogne-Franche-Comté
- Department: Saône-et-Loire
- Arrondissement: Mâcon
- Canton: Hurigny

Government
  - Mayor (2020–2026): Gilles Charpy-Puget
- Area^{1}: 11.11 km^{2} (4.29 sq mi)
- Elevation: 300 m (980 ft)
- Highest elevation: 476 m (1,562 ft)
- Lowest elevation: 230 m (750 ft)
- Population (2023): 265
  - Density: 23.9/km^{2} (61.8/sq mi)
- Time zone: UTC+01:00 (CET)
  - Summer (DST): UTC+02:00 (CEST)
- INSEE/Postal code: 71156 /71260
- ^{1} French Land Register data, which excludes lakes, ponds, glaciers > 1 km^{2} (0.386 sq mi or 247 acres) and river estuaries.

Cruzille is a commune in the Saône-et-Loire department in the region of Bourgogne-Franche-Comté in eastern France.

== Description ==
Besides the town proper, Cruzille is also composed of five hamlets : Collonge, Sagy-le-Haut and Sagy-le-bas, located in the winegrowing valley in the east, and Fragnes and Ouxy, in the west, on the other side of the Bois de la Montagne. Both Fragnes and Ouxy are remarquable by the fact they are turned towards the Cormatin valley at the border between the winegrowing valley of the Haut-Mâconnais and the more cattle farming oriented valley of Cluny.

Cruzille is a wine-producing village in the area of production of Mâcon-Lugny with the three villages of Lugny, Saint-Gengoux-de-Scissé and Bissy-la-Mâconnaise. Most vineyards are composed of chardonnay which is almost exclusively vinified at the Cave de Lugny. There are however several independent winemakers in the village such Domaine des Vignes du Maynes and Domain Guillot-Broux (which was a pioneer in organic wines in France starting back in 1954).

There is a national forest (La forêt des Grisons) composed of deciduous trees and conifers in the village.

== Population ==
=== Demography ===
The inhabitants are called Cruzillois. There are around 200 inhabitants.

=== Schools ===
There are no more schools in the village. There is a nursery in the old school building. Older children can go to primary school to Lugny or Saint-Gengoux-de-Scissé. There is a secondary school in Lugny. For lycées, teenagers should go to high school to Tournus but some also decide to go to one in Mâcon.

=== Religion ===
Cruzille is part the Notre-Dame-des-Coteaux en Mâconnais parish based in the nearby village of Lugny.

=== Economy ===
Cruzille's economy is mostly in the wine-making industry.

== Notable people ==
- Rémi Allier, director and scriptwriter, who earned the César of best short film for "Les petites mains" in 2019. Born in Mâcon, he spent his childhood in Cruzille.
- Vincent Dedienne, born on February 2, 1987 in Mâcon, actor, writer and comedian.
- Claude Rochat, also called Commandant Guillaume, in charge of the maquis of the Armée secrète for the whole of Saône-et-Loire which was based in the Château de Cruzille.
- Madame Letourneau, centenarian living in the hamlet of Sagy-le-Bas born on August 15, 1847.
- Jean-Baptiste Chamborre, political personality in Mâcon who died on April 29, 1837 in Cruzille. Prosecutor in Mâcon,he was elected as a substitute deputy for Sâone-et-Loire in 1792 and started to sit in July 1793.
- The Aristocratic family of Nanton.

== See also ==
- Communes of the Saône-et-Loire department
