= Senozan =

- Commune
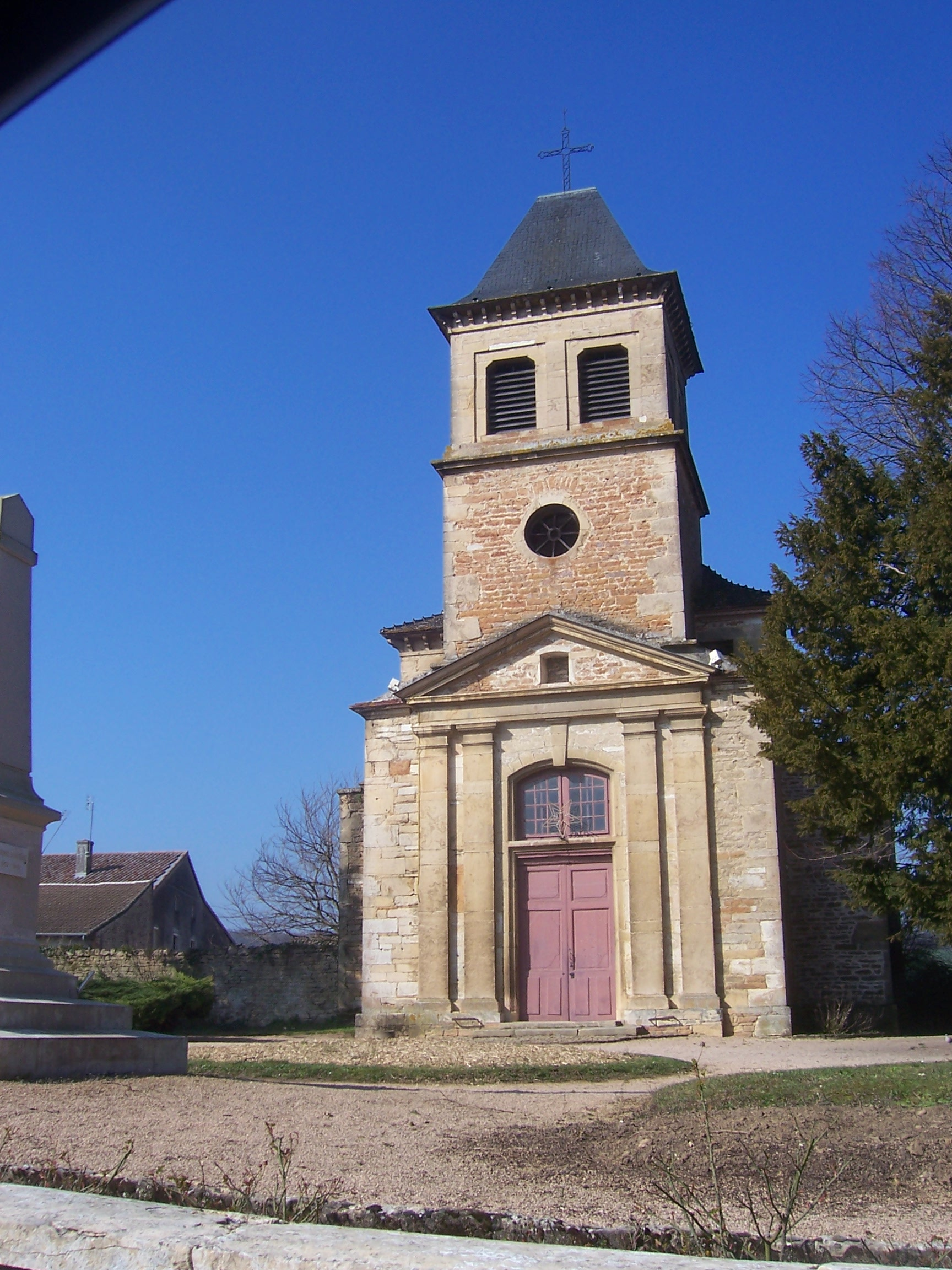
- The church in Senozan
- Location of Senozan
- Location within France Location within Bourgogne-Franche-Comté
- Coordinates: 46°23′39″N 4°51′57″E
- Country: France
- Region: Bourgogne-Franche-Comté
- Department: Saône-et-Loire
- Arrondissement: Mâcon
- Canton: Hurigny
- Intercommunality: Mâconnais Beaujolais Agglomération
- Area^{1}: 4.86 km^{2} (1.88 sq mi)
- Elevation: 184 m (604 ft)
- Highest elevation: 285 m (935 ft)
- Lowest elevation: 167 m (548 ft)
- Population (2023): 1,135
  - Density: 234/km^{2} (605/sq mi)
- Time zone: UTC+01:00 (CET)
  - Summer (DST): UTC+02:00 (CEST)
- INSEE/Postal code: 71513 /71260
- ^{1} French Land Register data, which excludes lakes, ponds, glaciers > 1 km^{2} (0.386 sq mi or 247 acres) and river estuaries.

Senozan (French pronunciation: [sənozɑ̃]) is a commune in the department of Saône-et-Loire in the region of Bourgogne-Franche-Comté in France.

== Geography ==
Senozan lies in the terraced hills west of the Saône 10 km north of Mâcon.

The "mountain" on the east rises to 370 meters, and the commune slopes gently down to the Saône. On the south lies the commune of Saint-Martin-Belle-Roche. The Mouge flows from west to east and into the Saône.

The village is limited on the west by the autoroute 6, which runs from Macon north to Chalon-sur-Saône. On the east are the departmental highway 906 (formerly the national highway 6) and the railroad.
