= Chânes =

- Commune
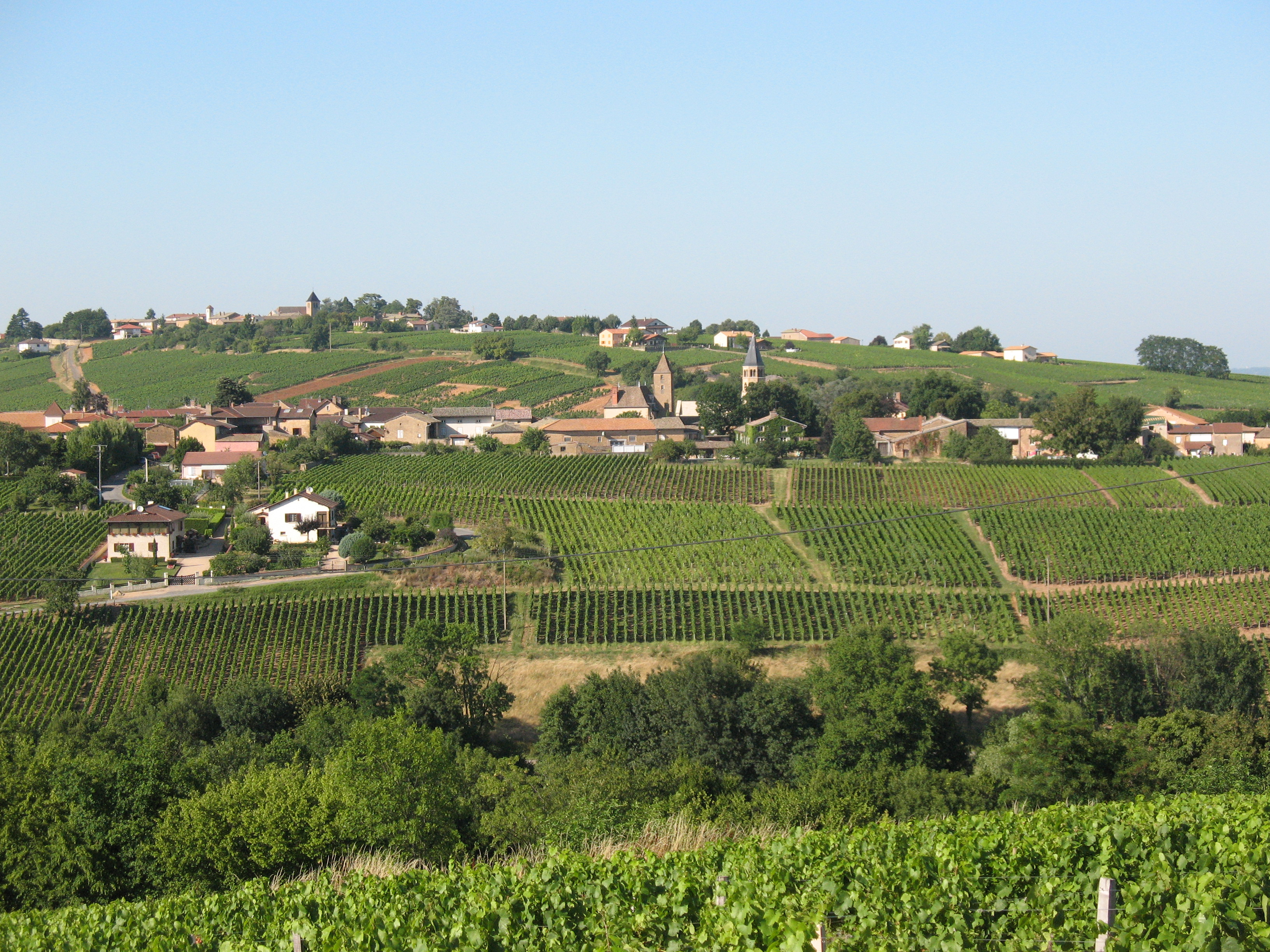
- A general view of Chânes
- Location of Chânes
- Location within France Location within Bourgogne-Franche-Comté
- Coordinates: 46°15′10″N 4°45′18″E
- Country: France
- Region: Bourgogne-Franche-Comté
- Department: Saône-et-Loire
- Arrondissement: Mâcon
- Canton: La Chapelle-de-Guinchay
- Intercommunality: Mâconnais Beaujolais Agglomération

Government
  - Mayor (2020–2026): Brigitte Darmedru
- Area^{1}: 2.24 km^{2} (0.86 sq mi)
- Elevation: 220 m (720 ft)
- Highest elevation: 264 m (866 ft)
- Lowest elevation: 196 m (643 ft)
- Population (2023): 530
  - Density: 240/km^{2} (610/sq mi)
- Time zone: UTC+01:00 (CET)
  - Summer (DST): UTC+02:00 (CEST)
- INSEE/Postal code: 71084 /71570
- ^{1} French Land Register data, which excludes lakes, ponds, glaciers > 1 km^{2} (0.386 sq mi or 247 acres) and river estuaries.

Chânes (French pronunciation: [ʃan]) is a commune in the Saône-et-Loire department in the region of Bourgogne-Franche-Comté in eastern France.

== See also ==
- Communes of the Saône-et-Loire department
