= Charbonnières, Saône-et-Loire =

Charbonnières
- Commune
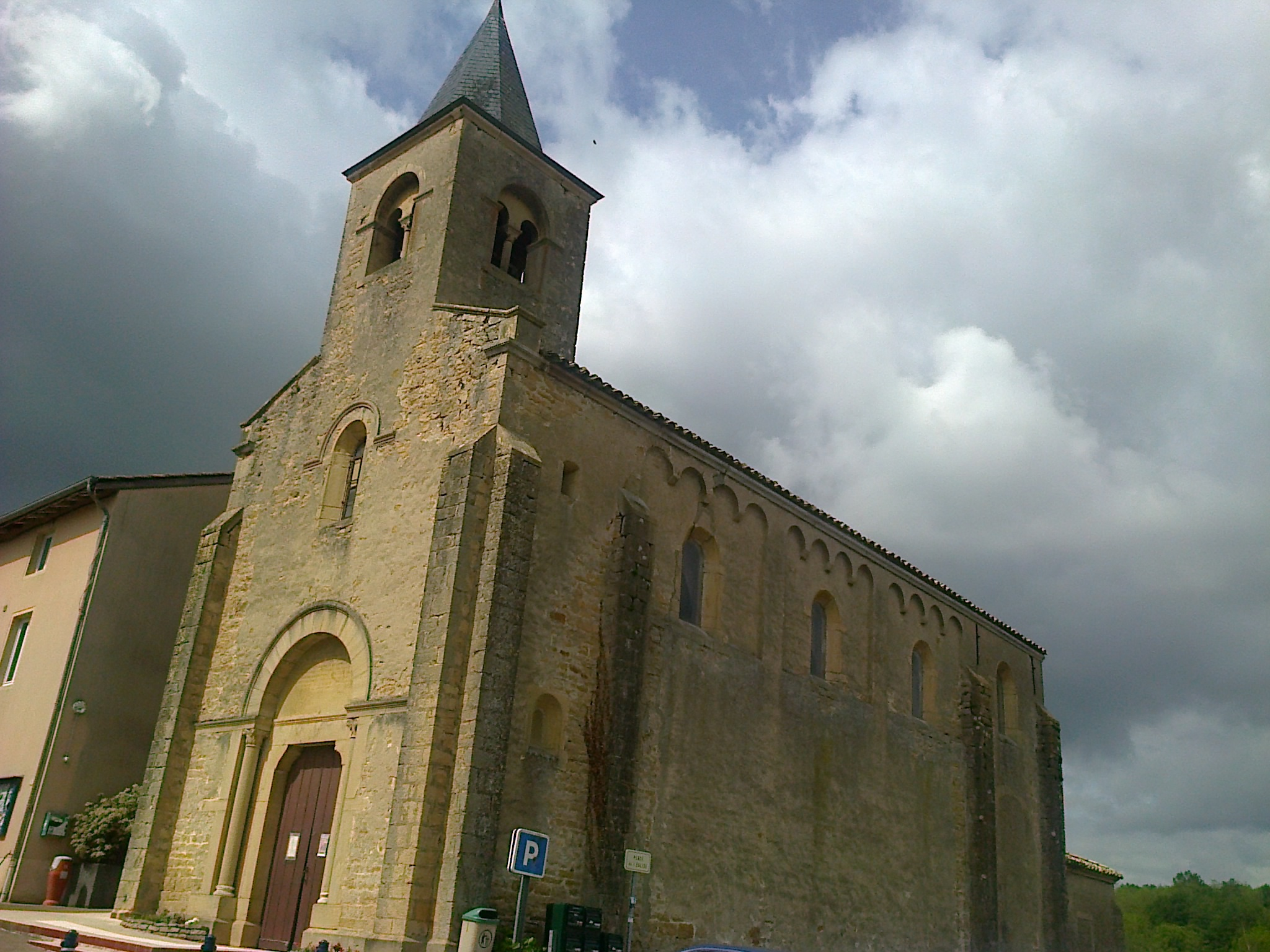
- The church in Charbonnières
- Location of Charbonnières
- Location within France Location within Bourgogne-Franche-Comté
- Coordinates: 46°23′25″N 4°49′58″E
- Country: France
- Region: Bourgogne-Franche-Comté
- Department: Saône-et-Loire
- Arrondissement: Mâcon
- Canton: Hurigny
- Intercommunality: Mâconnais Beaujolais Agglomération
- Area^{1}: 4.17 km^{2} (1.61 sq mi)
- Elevation: 220 m (720 ft)
- Highest elevation: 277 m (909 ft)
- Lowest elevation: 181 m (594 ft)
- Population (2023): 335
  - Density: 80.3/km^{2} (208/sq mi)
- Time zone: UTC+01:00 (CET)
  - Summer (DST): UTC+02:00 (CEST)
- INSEE/Postal code: 71099 /71260
- ^{1} French Land Register data, which excludes lakes, ponds, glaciers > 1 km^{2} (0.386 sq mi or 247 acres) and river estuaries.

Charbonnières (French pronunciation: [ʃaʁbɔnjɛʁ]) is a commune in the Saône-et-Loire department in the region of Bourgogne-Franche-Comté in eastern France.

== See also ==
- Communes of the Saône-et-Loire department
