= Laizé =

- Commune
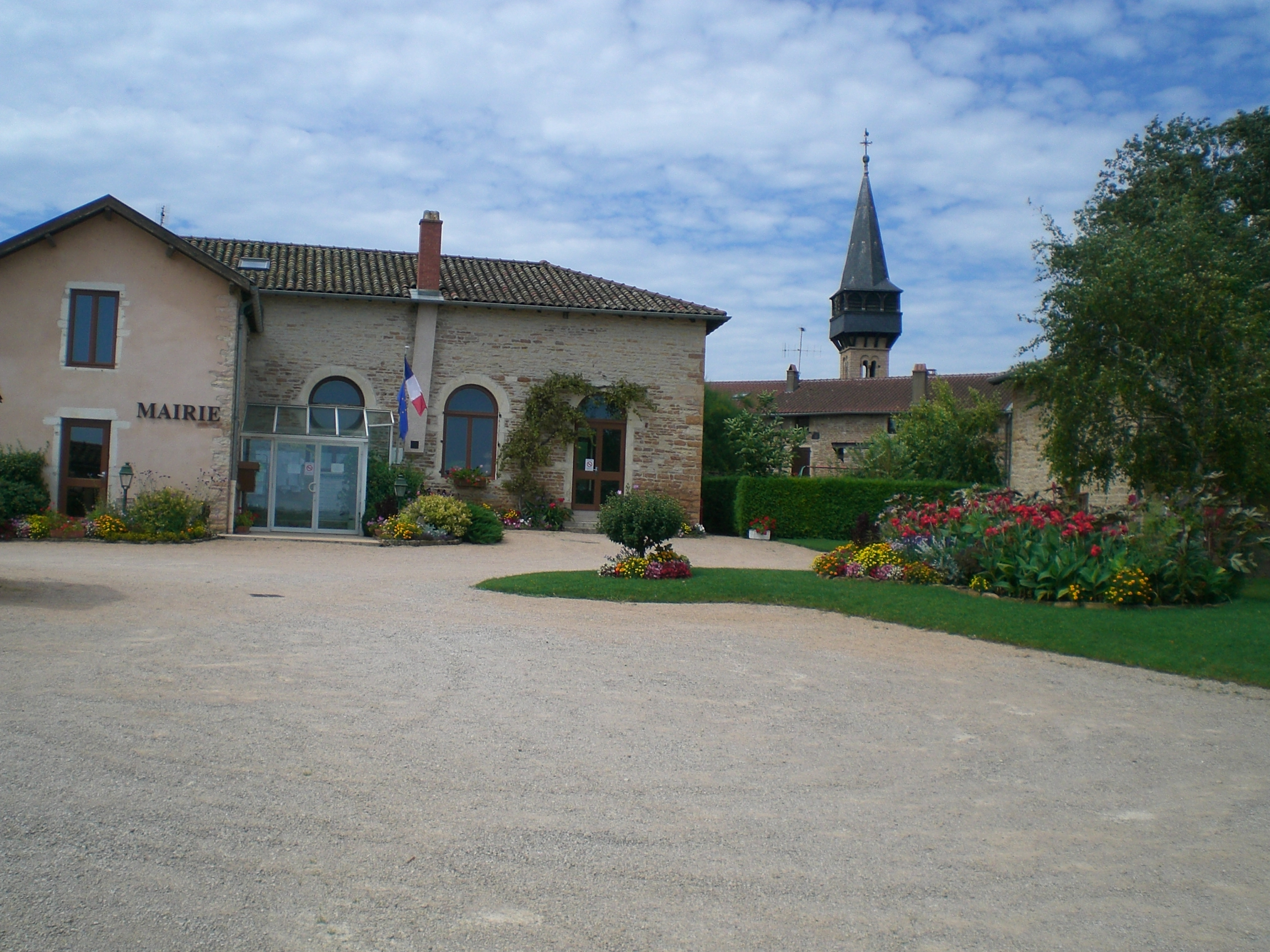
- The town hall and church in Laizé
- Location of Laizé
- Location within France Location within Bourgogne-Franche-Comté
- Coordinates: 46°23′43″N 4°48′21″E
- Country: France
- Region: Bourgogne-Franche-Comté
- Department: Saône-et-Loire
- Arrondissement: Mâcon
- Canton: Hurigny
- Intercommunality: Mâconnais Beaujolais Agglomération

Government
  - Mayor (2021–2026): Daniel Delume
- Area^{1}: 10.44 km^{2} (4.03 sq mi)
- Elevation: 220 m (720 ft)
- Highest elevation: 319 m (1,047 ft)
- Lowest elevation: 191 m (627 ft)
- Population (2023): 1,155
  - Density: 110.6/km^{2} (286.5/sq mi)
- Time zone: UTC+01:00 (CET)
  - Summer (DST): UTC+02:00 (CEST)
- INSEE/Postal code: 71250 /71870
- ^{1} French Land Register data, which excludes lakes, ponds, glaciers > 1 km^{2} (0.386 sq mi or 247 acres) and river estuaries.

Laizé (French pronunciation: [lɛze]; Arpitan: Lèsié) is a commune in the Saône-et-Loire department in the region of Bourgogne-Franche-Comté in eastern France.

== Wine ==
Vineyards of Laizé are part of the appellation d'origine contrôlée Viré-Clessé, which is used for white wines from Chardonnay grapes.

== See also ==
- Communes of the Saône-et-Loire department
