= Berzé-la-Ville =

- Commune
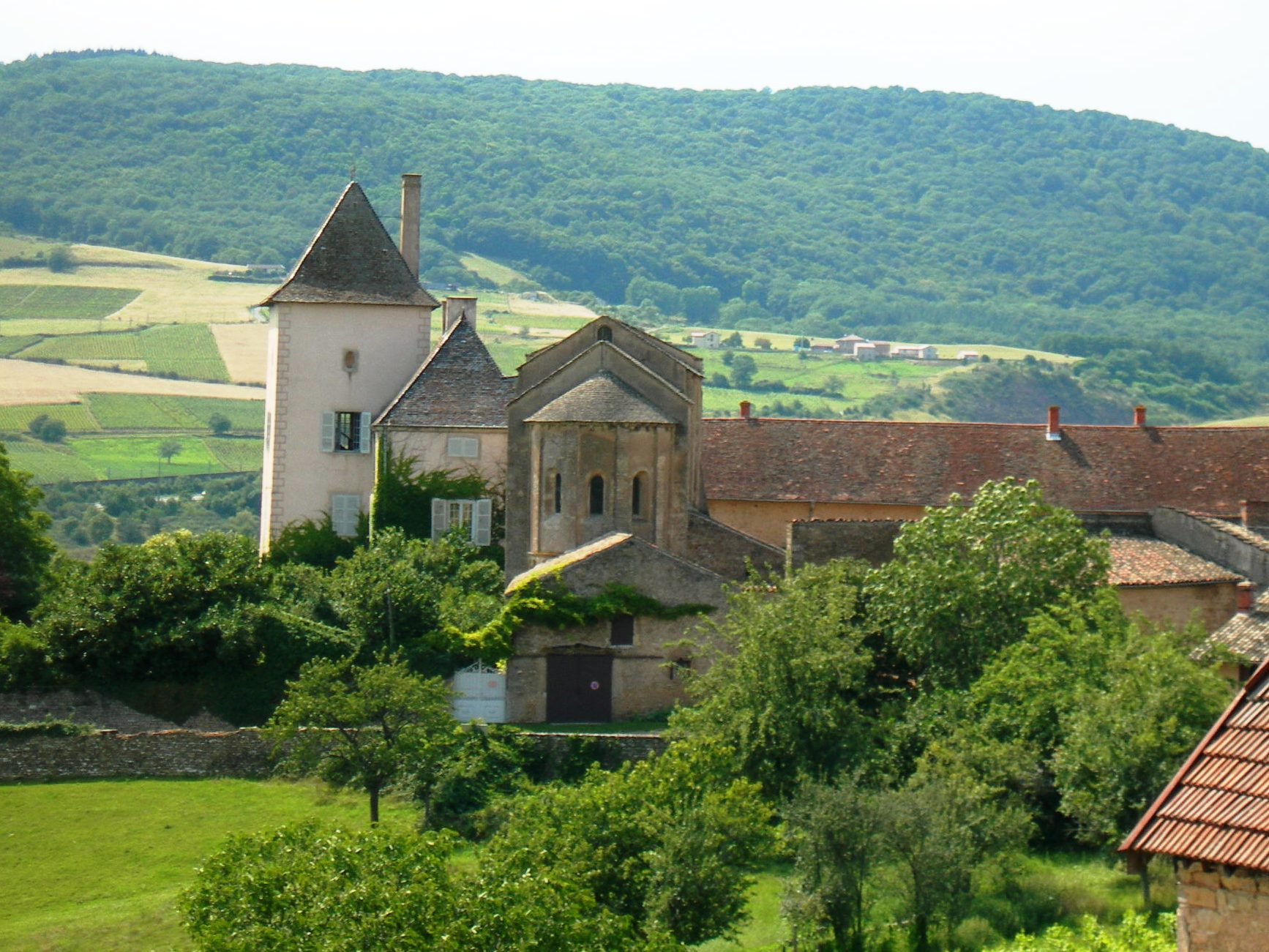
- Chapelle des Moines

- Coat of arms
- Location of Berzé-la-Ville
- Location within France Location within Bourgogne-Franche-Comté
- Coordinates: 46°21′50″N 4°42′15″E
- Country: France
- Region: Bourgogne-Franche-Comté
- Department: Saône-et-Loire
- Arrondissement: Mâcon
- Canton: Hurigny
- Intercommunality: Mâconnais Beaujolais Agglomération

Government
  - Mayor (2020–2026): Eric Faure
- Area^{1}: 5.53 km^{2} (2.14 sq mi)
- Elevation: 333 m (1,093 ft)
- Highest elevation: 505 m (1,657 ft)
- Lowest elevation: 238 m (781 ft)
- Population (2023): 708
  - Density: 128/km^{2} (332/sq mi)
- Time zone: UTC+01:00 (CET)
  - Summer (DST): UTC+02:00 (CEST)
- INSEE/Postal code: 71032 /71960
- ^{1} French Land Register data, which excludes lakes, ponds, glaciers > 1 km^{2} (0.386 sq mi or 247 acres) and river estuaries.

Berzé-la-Ville (French pronunciation: [bɛʁze la vil]; Arpitan: Bresié-la-Vela) is a commune in the Saône-et-Loire department in the region of Bourgogne-Franche-Comté in eastern France.

== Population ==
Historical population
Year	Pop.	±% p.a.
1968	341	—
1975	371	+1.21%
1982	410	+1.44%
1990	511	+2.79%
1999	530	+0.41%
2007	513	−0.41%
2012	554	+1.55%
2017	676	+4.06%
2023	708	+0.77%
Source: INSEE

== Chapel of the Monks ==
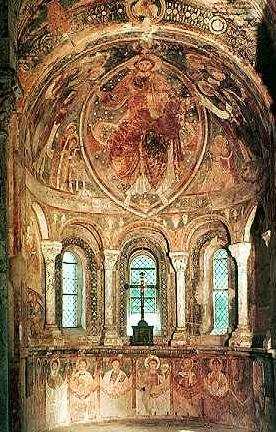
Berzé-la-Ville Chapel Apse, Christ in Majesty, early 12th century, painting.

The Berzé-la-Ville Chapel (or Chapelle Des Moines) is a grange located in Cluny, and is a French commune that was built in the eleventh century. The Berzé-la-Ville chapel was built with stone and the nave is covered by a barrel-vaulted ceiling. At the end of the nave, there is a semicircle apse, which is decorated with Romanesque paintings. The apse mural in the Berzé-la-Ville Chapel depicts the Traditio legis, which is an image of Christ enthroned flanked by Saints Peter and Paul. Using rich blue, green, brown, and red colors applied in fresco-secco, the apse gives a sense of the medieval color scheme, which is often lost in other structures as paintings often don't survive. The Traditio legis is altered to make a statement about the First Crusade and the Reconquista based on an apse in Cluny designed by Abbot Hugh of Cluny. It was altered to pay respect to the papacy, with the overall theme portraying Cluny’s services to the Christian community during this transitional period in Western history. This iconography was typically altered and reinterpreted during the medieval period. The primary image is of Christ seated in a mandorla, with Saints Paul and Peter on either side, each leading a group of six apostles. Only Christ, Saint Peter, and Saint Paul are usually present, but the Berzé-la-Ville apse is the first to depict all twelve apostles. In Cluny history, Cluniacs represent themselves as apostles, which in the Berzé-la-Ville apse promotes monasticism and the importance of the monks in Cluny. Due to this incorporation, Christ is portrayed handing the laws over to Saints Peter and Paul along with the apostles, which implies the responsibility of Christianitas belonged to the monks along with the papacy. This depicts respect for the papacy while representing a strong sense of pride in Cluny. At the feet of the mandorla are two deacons and two abbots of Cluny, which almost place these figures as equals to the apostles and martyrs. In the spandrels below the semi-domed apse, are six bust images of female saints, representing virtue and Christian faith. Columns separate windows and two blind niches providing architectural support for scenes of the martyrdom of Saints Blasius and Vincent, both of whom were part of a cult in Cluny. In the socle zone, there are nine bust images of male saints, five of which are Eastern Saints, and four were warriors, all of whom were persecuted by the Romans. The saints featured are from Cluny's Liturgical Calendar, which symbolizes Cluny's ties to Rome, as well as Abbot Hugh's interest in Byzantium. The layout of the apse image is also connected to Mappamundi, which is the layout of the medieval European map, as the images from left to right depict saints and martyrs from different European regions, which connects the apse mural to the First Crusade.

== See also ==
- Communes of the Saône-et-Loire department
