= La Salle, Saône-et-Loire =

La Salle
- Commune
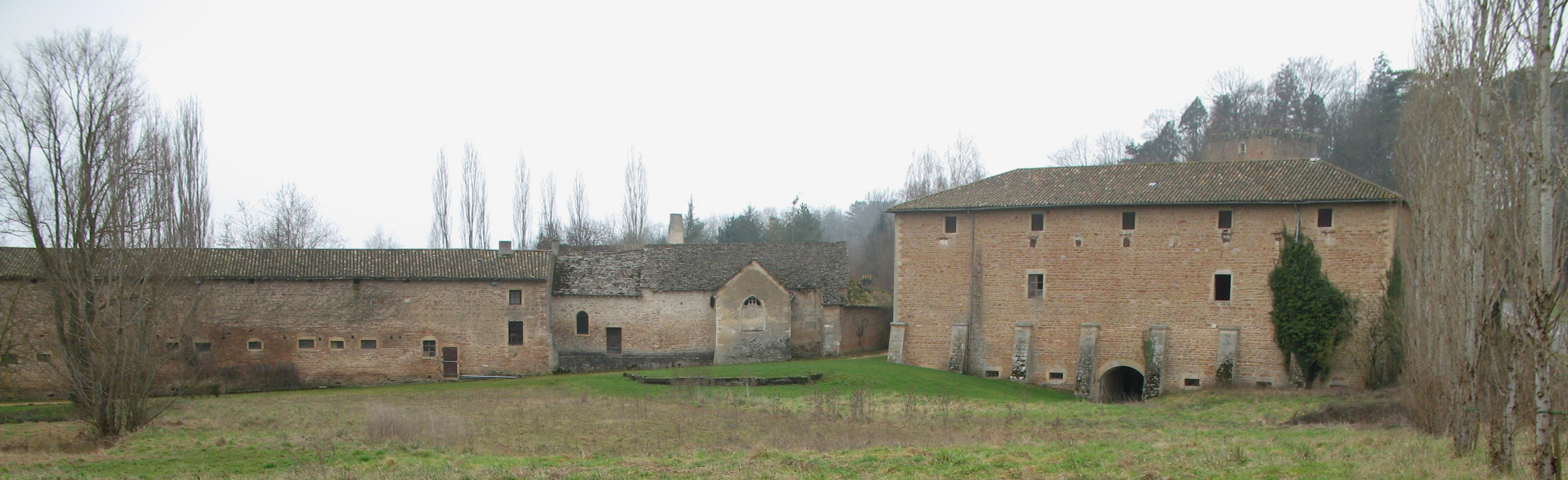
- Chateau

- Coat of arms
- Location of La Salle
- Location within France Location within Bourgogne-Franche-Comté
- Coordinates: 46°24′30″N 4°52′10″E
- Country: France
- Region: Bourgogne-Franche-Comté
- Department: Saône-et-Loire
- Arrondissement: Mâcon
- Canton: Hurigny
- Intercommunality: Mâconnais Beaujolais Agglomération

Government
  - Mayor (2020–2026): Yves Piponnier
- Area^{1}: 5.67 km^{2} (2.19 sq mi)
- Elevation: 181 m (594 ft)
- Highest elevation: 252 m (827 ft)
- Lowest elevation: 168 m (551 ft)
- Population (2023): 506
  - Density: 89.2/km^{2} (231/sq mi)
- Time zone: UTC+01:00 (CET)
  - Summer (DST): UTC+02:00 (CEST)
- INSEE/Postal code: 71494 /71260
- ^{1} French Land Register data, which excludes lakes, ponds, glaciers > 1 km^{2} (0.386 sq mi or 247 acres) and river estuaries.

La Salle (French pronunciation: [la sal]) is a commune in the Saône-et-Loire department in the region of Bourgogne-Franche-Comté in eastern France.

== See also ==
- Communes of the Saône-et-Loire department
