= Saint-Albain =

- Commune
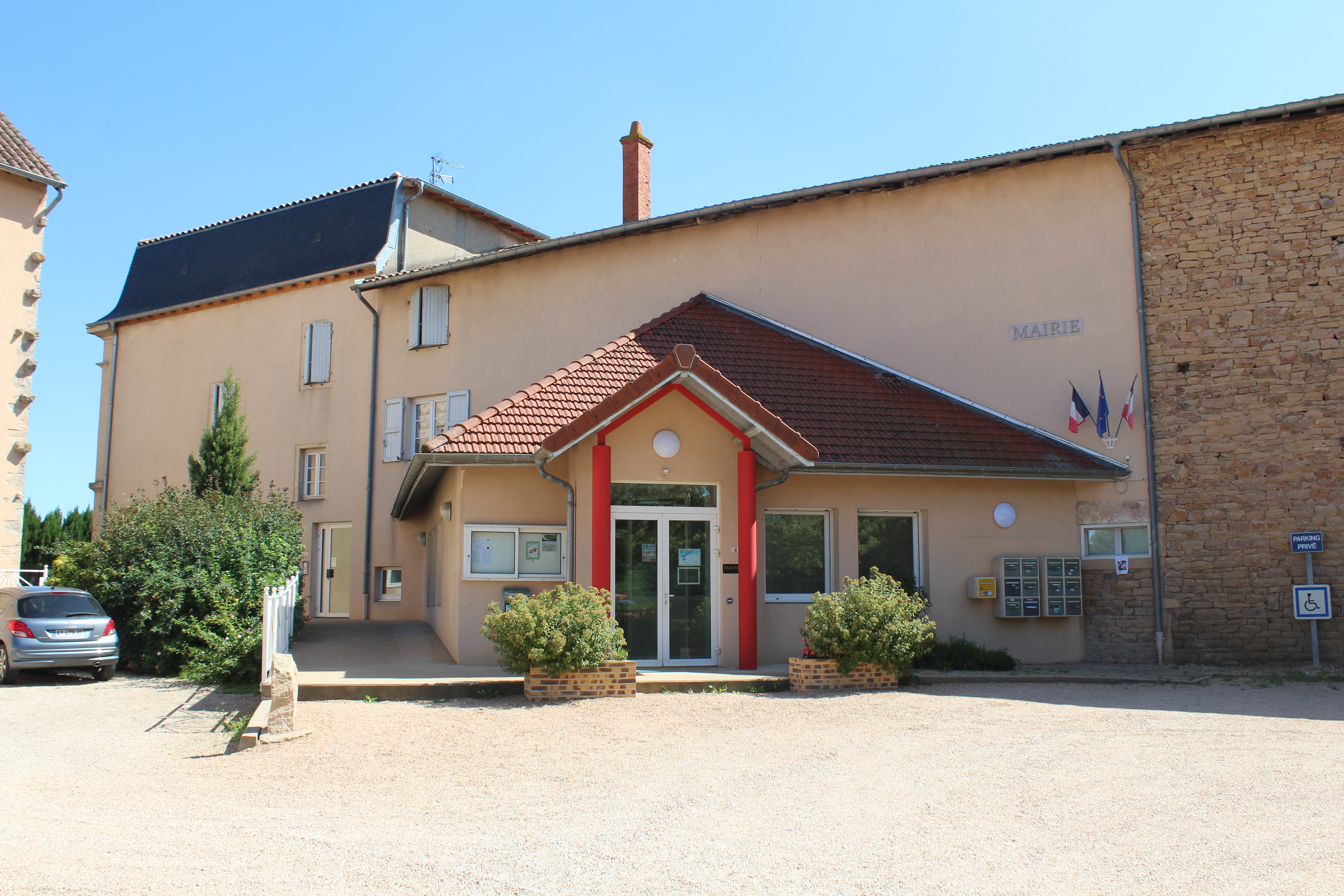
- The town hall in Saint-Albain
- Location of Saint-Albain
- Location within France Location within Bourgogne-Franche-Comté
- Coordinates: 46°25′43″N 4°52′40″E
- Country: France
- Region: Bourgogne-Franche-Comté
- Department: Saône-et-Loire
- Arrondissement: Mâcon
- Canton: Hurigny

Government
  - Mayor (2020–2026): Marc Dumont
- Area^{1}: 5.64 km^{2} (2.18 sq mi)
- Elevation: 178 m (584 ft)
- Highest elevation: 252 m (827 ft)
- Lowest elevation: 168 m (551 ft)
- Population (2023): 550
  - Density: 98/km^{2} (250/sq mi)
- Time zone: UTC+01:00 (CET)
  - Summer (DST): UTC+02:00 (CEST)
- INSEE/Postal code: 71383 /71260
- ^{1} French Land Register data, which excludes lakes, ponds, glaciers > 1 km^{2} (0.386 sq mi or 247 acres) and river estuaries.

Saint-Albain (French pronunciation: [sɛ̃.t‿albɛ̃]; Arpitan: Sant-Ôbin) is a commune in the Saône-et-Loire department in the region of Bourgogne-Franche-Comté in eastern France.

== See also ==
- Communes of the Saône-et-Loire department
