= Chevagny-les-Chevrières =

- Commune
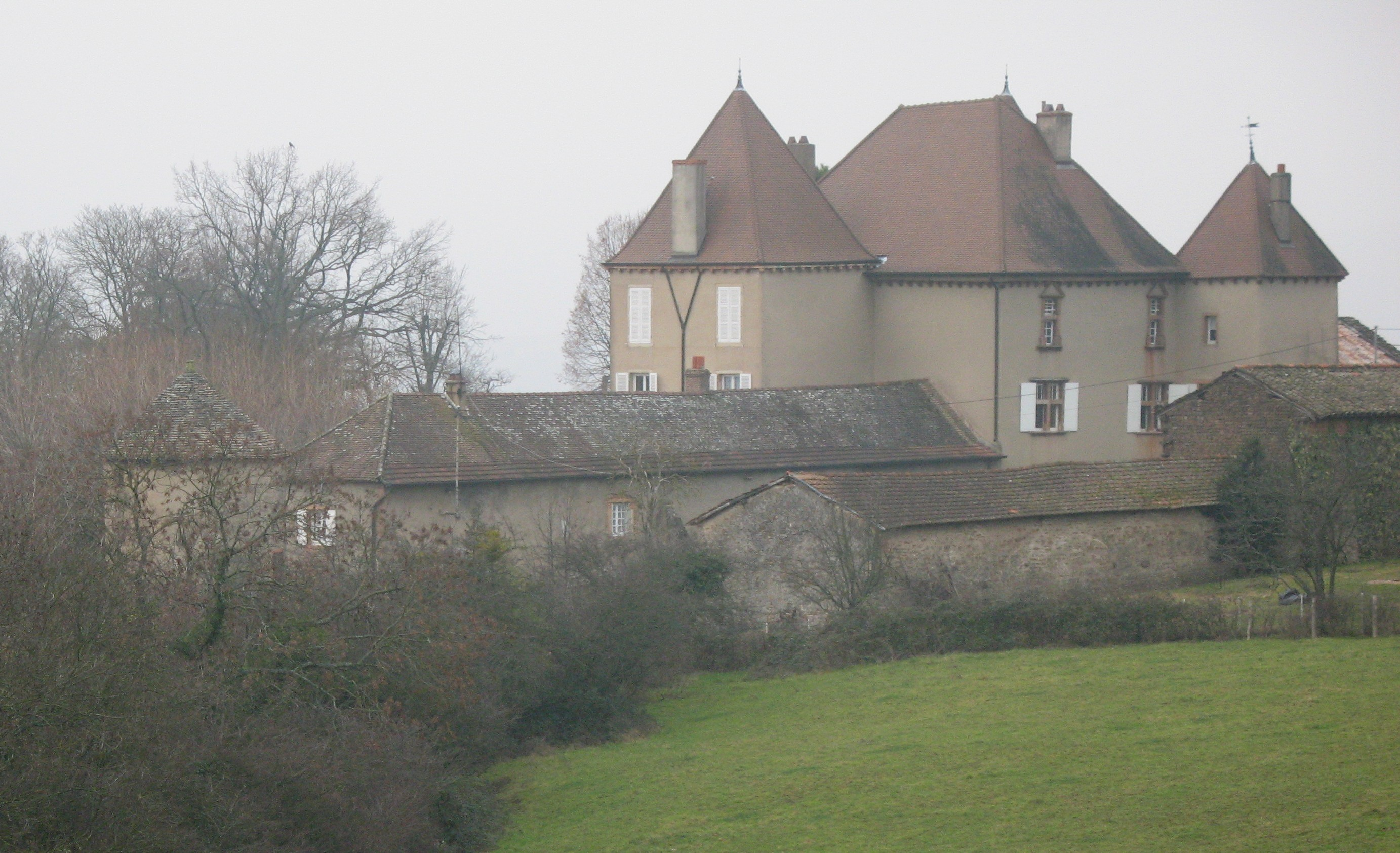
- The chateau in Chevagny-les-Chevrières

- Coat of arms
- Location of Chevagny-les-Chevrières
- Location within France Location within Bourgogne-Franche-Comté
- Coordinates: 46°19′57″N 4°46′19″E
- Country: France
- Region: Bourgogne-Franche-Comté
- Department: Saône-et-Loire
- Arrondissement: Mâcon
- Canton: Hurigny
- Intercommunality: Mâconnais Beaujolais Agglomération

Government
  - Mayor (2020–2026): Philippe Commerçon
- Area^{1}: 3.8 km^{2} (1.5 sq mi)
- Elevation: 237 m (778 ft)
- Highest elevation: 375 m (1,230 ft)
- Lowest elevation: 212 m (696 ft)
- Population (2023): 607
  - Density: 160/km^{2} (410/sq mi)
- Time zone: UTC+01:00 (CET)
  - Summer (DST): UTC+02:00 (CEST)
- INSEE/Postal code: 71126 /71960
- ^{1} French Land Register data, which excludes lakes, ponds, glaciers > 1 km^{2} (0.386 sq mi or 247 acres) and river estuaries.

Chevagny-les-Chevrières is a commune in the Saône-et-Loire department in the region of Bourgogne-Franche-Comté in eastern France. In the centre of the commune is located a gothic church. The commune also has a chateau.

== Population ==
Historical population
| Year | Pop. | ±% p.a. |
|---|---|---|
| 1968 | 225 | — |
| 1975 | 283 | +3.33% |
| 1982 | 353 | +3.21% |
| 1990 | 403 | +1.67% |
| 1999 | 403 | +0.00% |
| 2007 | 583 | +4.72% |
| 2012 | 600 | +0.58% |
| 2017 | 592 | −0.27% |
| 2023 | 607 | +0.42% |
Source: INSEE

== See also ==
- Communes of the Saône-et-Loire department
