= Canton of Hurigny =

Coordinates: 46.35°N 4.79°E

The canton of Hurigny is an administrative division of the Saône-et-Loire department, eastern France. It was created at the French canton reorganisation which came into effect in March 2015. Its seat is in Hurigny.

It consists of the following communes:

1. Azé
2. Berzé-la-Ville
3. Bissy-la-Mâconnaise
4. Burgy
5. Bussières
6. Charbonnières
7. Chevagny-les-Chevrières
8. Clessé
9. Cruzille
10. Fleurville
11. Hurigny
12. Igé
13. Laizé
14. Lugny
15. Milly-Lamartine
16. Montbellet
17. Péronne
18. Prissé
19. La Roche-Vineuse
20. Saint-Albain
21. Saint-Gengoux-de-Scissé
22. Saint-Martin-Belle-Roche
23. Saint-Maurice-de-Satonnay
24. La Salle
25. Senozan
26. Sologny
27. Verzé
28. Viré
