= Mâconnais Beaujolais Agglomération =

- Communauté d'agglomération
- Interactive map of Mâconnais Beaujolais Agglomération
- Coordinates: 46°20′N 04°50′E
- Country: France
- Region: Auvergne-Rhône-Alpes, Bourgogne-Franche-Comté
- Department: Ain, Saône-et-Loire
- No. of communes: {{{nbcomm}}}
- Established: 2017
- Area: 298.2 km^{2} (115.1 sq mi)
- Population (2019): 78,281
  - Density: 262.5/km^{2} (679.9/sq mi)
- Website: www.mb-agglo.com

Mâconnais Beaujolais Agglomération is the communauté d'agglomération, an intercommunal structure, centred on the city of Mâcon. It is located in the Saône-et-Loire and Ain departments, in the Bourgogne-Franche-Comté and Auvergne-Rhône-Alpes regions, eastern France. Created in 2017, its seat is in Mâcon. Its area is 298.2 km^{2}. Its population was 78,281 in 2019, of which 33,908 in Mâcon proper.

== Composition ==
The communauté d'agglomération consists of the following 39 communes, of which one (Saint-Laurent-sur-Saône) in the Ain department:

1. Azé
2. Berzé-la-Ville
3. Bussières
4. Chaintré
5. Chânes
6. La Chapelle-de-Guinchay
7. Charbonnières
8. Charnay-lès-Mâcon
9. Chasselas
10. Chevagny-les-Chevrières
11. Crêches-sur-Saône
12. Davayé
13. Fuissé
14. Hurigny
15. Igé
16. Laizé
17. Leynes
18. Mâcon
19. Milly-Lamartine
20. Péronne
21. Prissé
22. Pruzilly
23. La Roche-Vineuse
24. Romanèche-Thorins
25. Saint-Amour-Bellevue
26. Saint-Laurent-sur-Saône
27. Saint-Martin-Belle-Roche
28. Saint-Maurice-de-Satonnay
29. Saint-Symphorien-d'Ancelles
30. Saint-Vérand
31. La Salle
32. Sancé
33. Senozan
34. Sologny
35. Solutré-Pouilly
36. Varennes-lès-Mâcon
37. Vergisson
38. Verzé
39. Vinzelles
