= Arrondissement of Mâcon =

Coordinates: 46.3064°N 4.8314°E

Mâcon
- Arrondissement
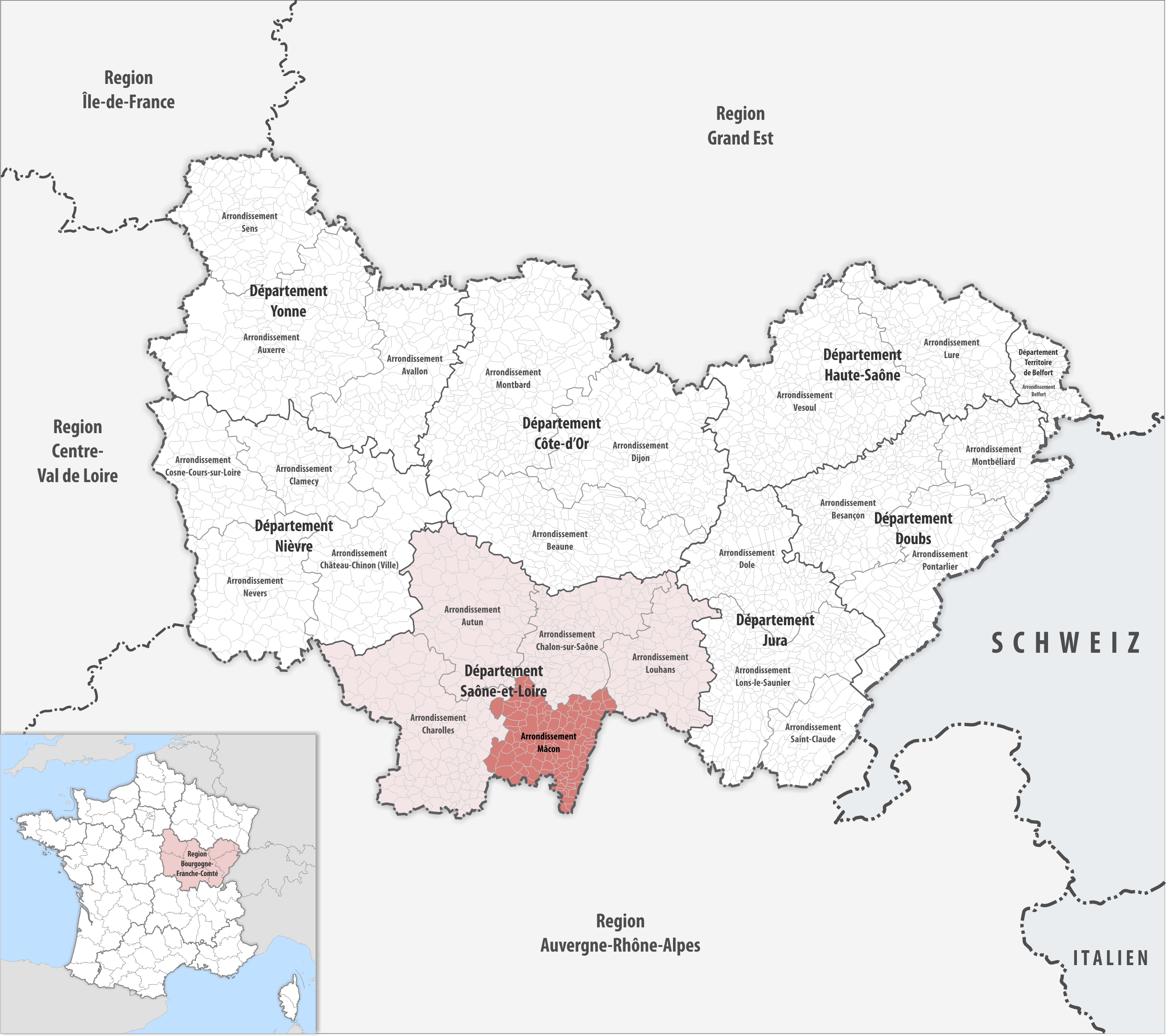
- Location within the region Bourgogne-Franche-Comté
- Country: France
- Region: Bourgogne-Franche-Comté
- Department: Saône-et-Loire
- No. of communes: {{{nbcomm}}}
- Area: 1,221.9 km^{2} (471.8 sq mi)
- Population (2023): 116,435
  - Density: 95.290/km^{2} (246.80/sq mi)
- INSEE code: 715

The arrondissement of Mâcon is an arrondissement in the department of Saône-et-Loire, in the French region of Bourgogne-Franche-Comté. It has 119 communes. Its population is 115,125 (2021), and its area is 1,221.9 km^{2} (471.8 sq mi).

== Composition ==
The communes of the arrondissement of Mâcon, and their INSEE codes, are:

1. Ameugny (71007)
2. Azé (71016)
3. Bergesserin (71030)
4. Berzé-la-Ville (71032)
5. Berzé-le-Châtel (71031)
6. Bissy-la-Mâconnaise (71035)
7. Blanot (71039)
8. Bonnay-Saint-Ythaire (71042)
9. Bourgvilain (71050)
10. Bray (71057)
11. Buffières (71065)
12. Burgy (71066)
13. Burzy (71068)
14. Bussières (71069)
15. Chaintré (71074)
16. Chânes (71084)
17. La Chapelle-de-Guinchay (71090)
18. La Chapelle-du-Mont-de-France (71091)
19. La Chapelle-sous-Brancion (71094)
20. Charbonnières (71099)
21. Chardonnay (71100)
22. Charnay-lès-Mâcon (71105)
23. Chasselas (71108)
24. Château (71112)
25. Chérizet (71125)
26. Chevagny-les-Chevrières (71126)
27. Chevagny-sur-Guye (71127)
28. Chiddes (71128)
29. Chissey-lès-Mâcon (71130)
30. Clessé (71135)
31. Cluny (71137)
32. Cortambert (71146)
33. Cortevaix (71147)
34. Crêches-sur-Saône (71150)
35. Cruzille (71156)
36. Curtil-sous-Buffières (71163)
37. Davayé (71169)
38. Dompierre-les-Ormes (71178)
39. Donzy-le-Pertuis (71181)
40. Farges-lès-Mâcon (71195)
41. Flagy (71199)
42. Fleurville (71591)
43. Fuissé (71210)
44. Germolles-sur-Grosne (71217)
45. Grevilly (71226)
46. La Guiche (71231)
47. Hurigny (71235)
48. Igé (71236)
49. Jalogny (71240)
50. Joncy (71242)
51. Lacrost (71248)
52. Laizé (71250)
53. Leynes (71258)
54. Lournand (71264)
55. Lugny (71267)
56. Mâcon (71270)
57. Martailly-lès-Brancion (71284)
58. Massilly (71287)
59. Matour (71289)
60. Mazille (71290)
61. Milly-Lamartine (71299)
62. Montbellet (71305)
63. Montmelard (71316)
64. Navour-sur-Grosne (71134)
65. Ozenay (71338)
66. Passy (71344)
67. Péronne (71345)
68. Pierreclos (71350)
69. Plottes (71353)
70. Pressy-sous-Dondin (71358)
71. Préty (71359)
72. Prissé (71360)
73. Pruzilly (71362)
74. La Roche-Vineuse (71371)
75. Romanèche-Thorins (71372)
76. Royer (71377)
77. Sailly (71381)
78. Saint-Albain (71383)
79. Saint-Amour-Bellevue (71385)
80. Saint-André-le-Désert (71387)
81. Saint-Clément-sur-Guye (71400)
82. Sainte-Cécile (71397)
83. Saint-Gengoux-de-Scissé (71416)
84. Saint-Huruge (71427)
85. Saint-Léger-sous-la-Bussière (71441)
86. Saint-Marcelin-de-Cray (71446)
87. Saint-Martin-Belle-Roche (71448)
88. Saint-Martin-de-Salencey (71452)
89. Saint-Martin-la-Patrouille (71458)
90. Saint-Maurice-de-Satonnay (71460)
91. Saint-Pierre-le-Vieux (71469)
92. Saint-Point (71470)
93. Saint-Symphorien-d'Ancelles (71481)
94. Saint-Vérand (71487)
95. Saint-Vincent-des-Prés (71488)
96. La Salle (71494)
97. Salornay-sur-Guye (71495)
98. Sancé (71497)
99. Senozan (71513)
100. Serrières (71518)
101. Sigy-le-Châtel (71521)
102. Sivignon (71524)
103. Sologny (71525)
104. Solutré-Pouilly (71526)
105. Taizé (71532)
106. Tournus (71543)
107. Tramayes (71545)
108. Trambly (71546)
109. Trivy (71547)
110. La Truchère (71549)
111. Uchizy (71550)
112. Varennes-lès-Mâcon (71556)
113. Vergisson (71567)
114. Verosvres (71571)
115. Verzé (71574)
116. Le Villars (71576)
117. La Vineuse sur Fregande (71582)
118. Vinzelles (71583)
119. Viré (71584)

== History ==
The arrondissement of Mâcon was created in 1800. In January 2017 it gained one commune from the arrondissement of Chalon-sur-Saône and 10 communes from the arrondissement of Charolles, and it lost eight communes to the arrondissement of Chalon-sur-Saône and two communes to the arrondissement of Louhans.

As a result of the reorganisation of the cantons of France which came into effect in 2015, the borders of the cantons are no longer related to the borders of the arrondissements. The cantons of the arrondissement of Mâcon were, as of January 2015:

1. La Chapelle-de-Guinchay
2. Cluny
3. Lugny
4. Mâcon-Centre
5. Mâcon-Nord
6. Mâcon-Sud
7. Matour
8. Saint-Gengoux-le-National
9. Tournus
10. Tramayes
