= Viré =

- Commune
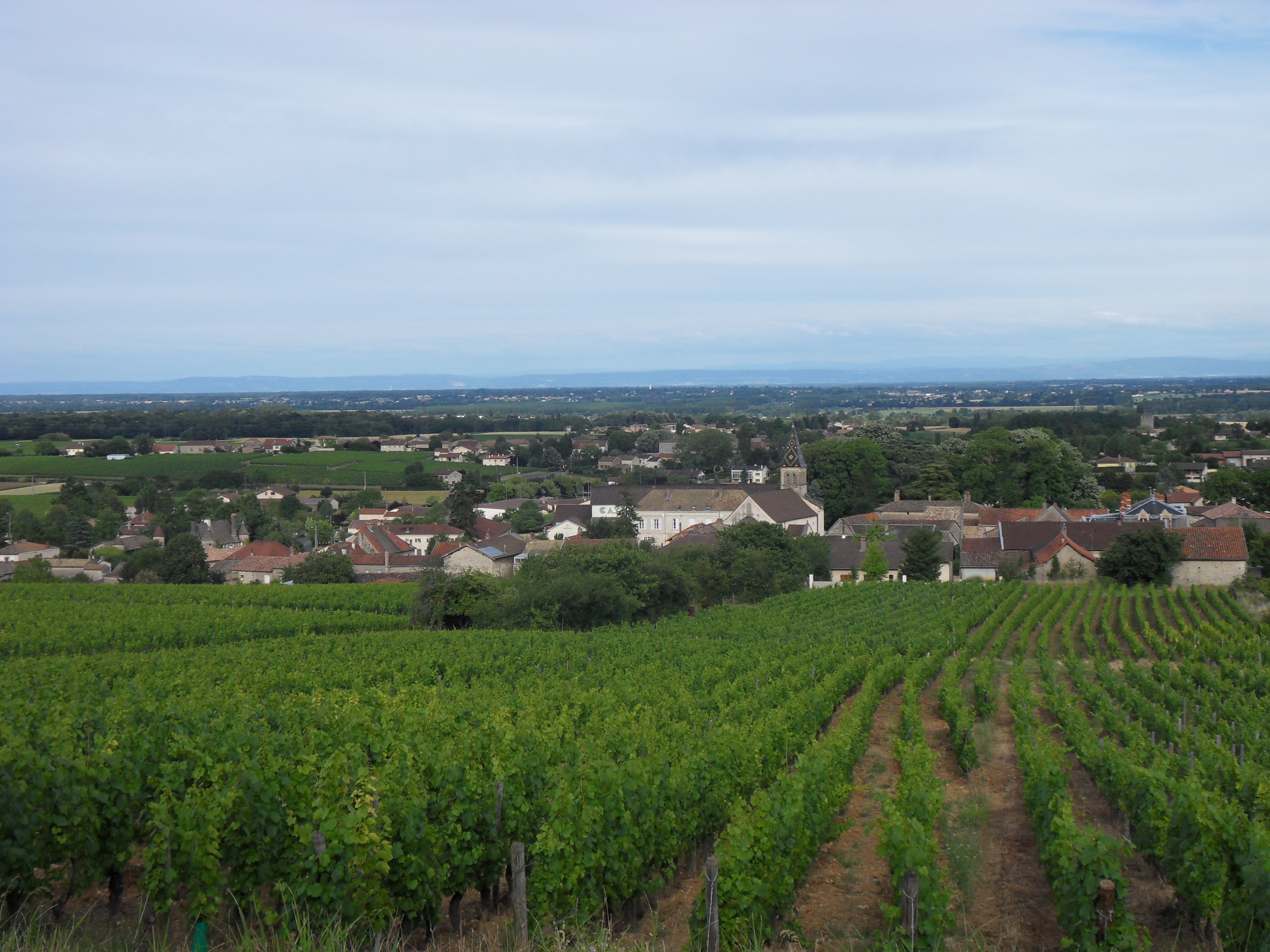
- A general view of Viré
- Location of Viré
- Location within France Location within Bourgogne-Franche-Comté
- Coordinates: 46°27′00″N 4°50′37″E
- Country: France
- Region: Bourgogne-Franche-Comté
- Department: Saône-et-Loire
- Arrondissement: Mâcon
- Canton: Hurigny

Government
  - Mayor (2020–2026): Patrick Desroches
- Area^{1}: 11.28 km^{2} (4.36 sq mi)
- Elevation: 220 m (720 ft)
- Highest elevation: 441 m (1,447 ft)
- Lowest elevation: 177 m (581 ft)
- Population (2023): 1,225
  - Density: 108.6/km^{2} (281.3/sq mi)
- Time zone: UTC+01:00 (CET)
  - Summer (DST): UTC+02:00 (CEST)
- INSEE/Postal code: 71584 /71260
- ^{1} French Land Register data, which excludes lakes, ponds, glaciers > 1 km^{2} (0.386 sq mi or 247 acres) and river estuaries.

Viré (French pronunciation: [viʁe]) is a commune in the Saône-et-Loire department in the region of Bourgogne-Franche-Comté in eastern France.

== Wine ==
Vineyards of Viré are part of the appellation d'origine contrôlée Viré-Clessé, which is used for white wines from Chardonnay grapes. Before 1999, the wines used to be called Mâcon-Viré.

== See also ==
- Communes of the Saône-et-Loire department
