= Leynes =

- Commune
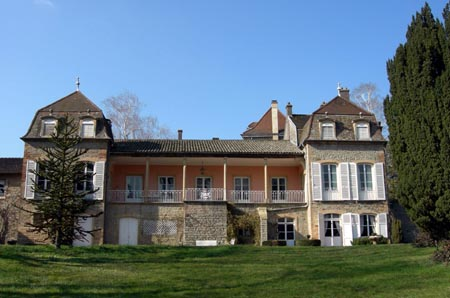
- Château des Correaux

- Coat of arms
- Location of Leynes
- Location within France Location within Bourgogne-Franche-Comté
- Coordinates: 46°16′11″N 4°43′45″E
- Country: France
- Region: Bourgogne-Franche-Comté
- Department: Saône-et-Loire
- Arrondissement: Mâcon
- Canton: La Chapelle-de-Guinchay
- Intercommunality: Mâconnais Beaujolais Agglomération
- Area^{1}: 4.83 km^{2} (1.86 sq mi)
- Elevation: 350 m (1,150 ft)
- Highest elevation: 515 m (1,690 ft)
- Lowest elevation: 230 m (750 ft)
- Population (2023): 519
  - Density: 107/km^{2} (278/sq mi)
- Time zone: UTC+01:00 (CET)
  - Summer (DST): UTC+02:00 (CEST)
- INSEE/Postal code: 71258 /71570
- ^{1} French Land Register data, which excludes lakes, ponds, glaciers > 1 km^{2} (0.386 sq mi or 247 acres) and river estuaries.

Leynes (French pronunciation: [lɛn]; Arpitan: Lèn) is a commune in the Saône-et-Loire department in the region of Bourgogne-Franche-Comté in eastern France.

== See also ==
- Communes of the Saône-et-Loire department
