= Azé, Saône-et-Loire =

Azé
- Commune
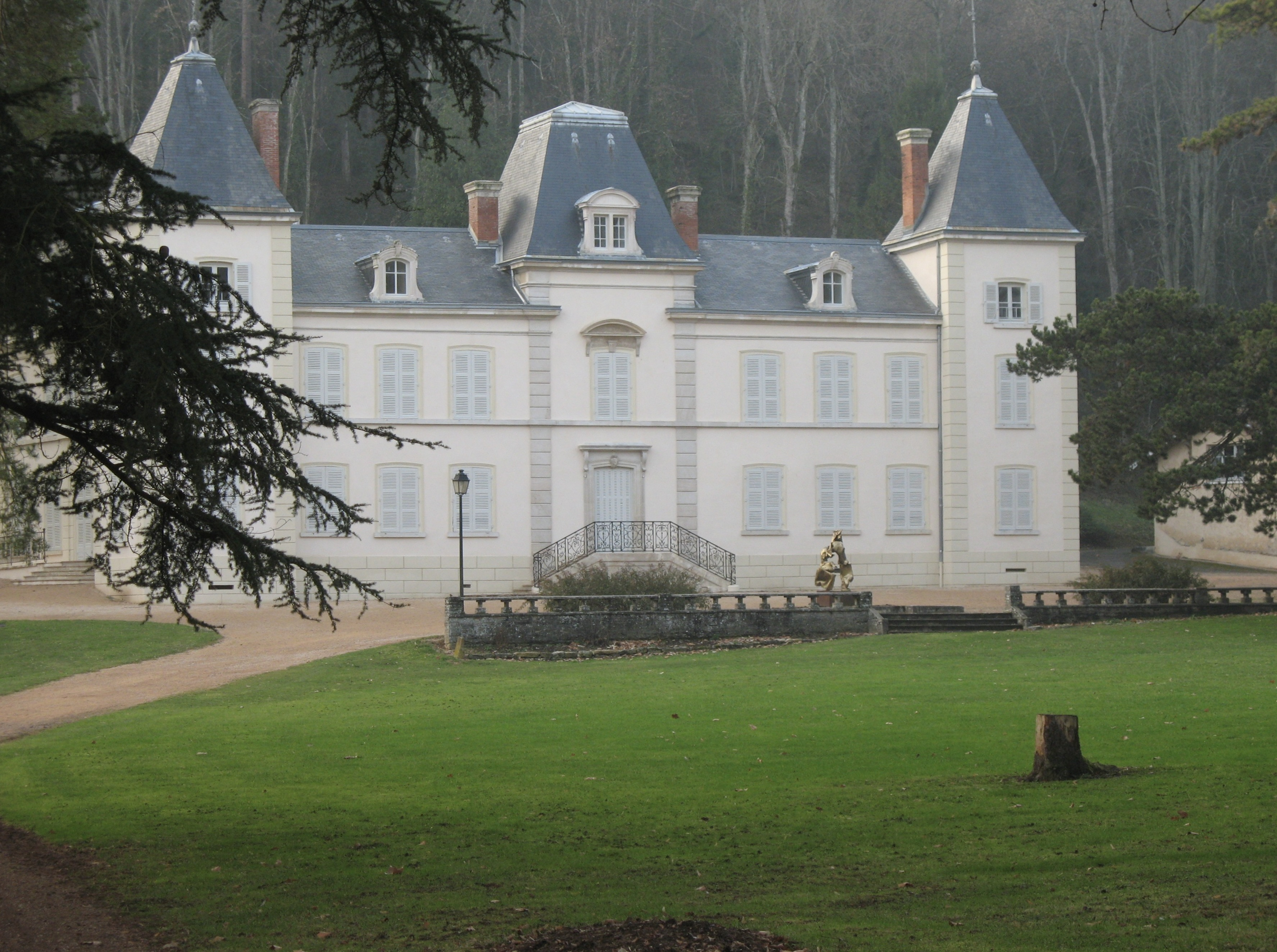
- Château de Vaux-sur-Aisne

- Coat of arms
- Location of Azé
- Location within France Location within Bourgogne-Franche-Comté
- Coordinates: 46°25′54″N 4°45′37″E
- Country: France
- Region: Bourgogne-Franche-Comté
- Department: Saône-et-Loire
- Arrondissement: Mâcon
- Canton: Hurigny
- Intercommunality: Mâconnais Beaujolais Agglomération

Government
  - Mayor (2022–2026): Serge Thirard
- Area^{1}: 14.97 km^{2} (5.78 sq mi)
- Elevation: 220 m (720 ft)
- Highest elevation: 550 m (1,800 ft)
- Lowest elevation: 220 m (720 ft)
- Population (2023): 1,103
  - Density: 73.68/km^{2} (190.8/sq mi)
- Time zone: UTC+01:00 (CET)
  - Summer (DST): UTC+02:00 (CEST)
- INSEE/Postal code: 71016 /71260
- ^{1} French Land Register data, which excludes lakes, ponds, glaciers > 1 km^{2} (0.386 sq mi or 247 acres) and river estuaries.

Azé (French pronunciation: [aze]) is a commune in the Saône-et-Loire department in the region of Bourgogne-Franche-Comté in eastern France.

== Geography ==
The commune lies in the south of the department near Mâcon.

== Population ==
Historical population
Year	Pop.	±% p.a.
1968	548	—
1975	553	+0.13%
1982	649	+2.31%
1990	807	+2.76%
1999	940	+1.71%
2007	1,006	+0.85%
2012	1,046	+0.78%
2017	1,046	+0.00%
2023	1,103	+0.89%
Source: INSEE

== See also ==
- Communes of the Saône-et-Loire department
