= Burgy =

- Commune
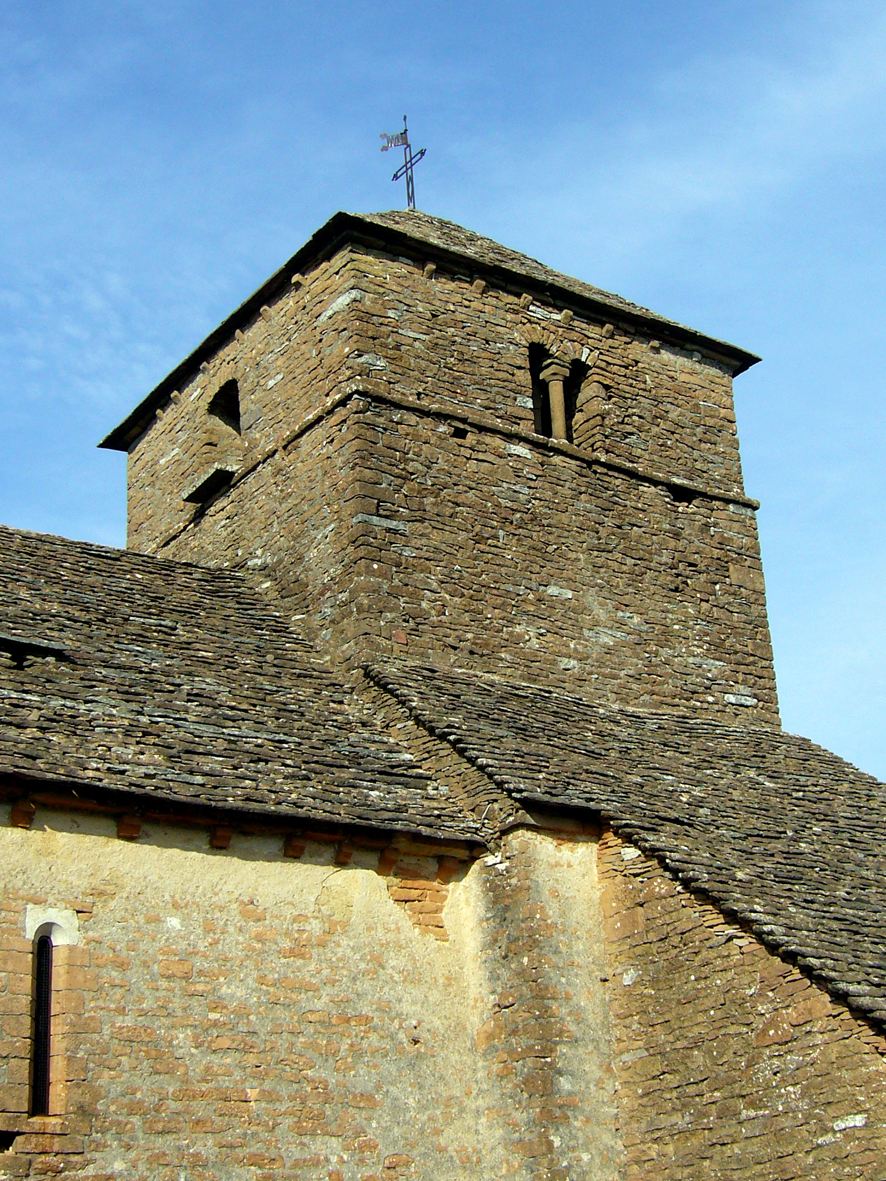
- The bell tower of the church in Burgy
- Location of Burgy
- Location within France Location within Bourgogne-Franche-Comté
- Coordinates: 46°27′52″N 4°49′58″E
- Country: France
- Region: Bourgogne-Franche-Comté
- Department: Saône-et-Loire
- Arrondissement: Mâcon
- Canton: Hurigny
- Intercommunality: Mâconnais - Tournugeois

Government
  - Mayor (2020–2026): Dominique Charnay
- Area^{1}: 2.87 km^{2} (1.11 sq mi)
- Elevation: 340 m (1,120 ft)
- Highest elevation: 441 m (1,447 ft)
- Lowest elevation: 207 m (679 ft)
- Population (2023): 112
  - Density: 39.0/km^{2} (101/sq mi)
- Time zone: UTC+01:00 (CET)
  - Summer (DST): UTC+02:00 (CEST)
- INSEE/Postal code: 71066 /71260
- ^{1} French Land Register data, which excludes lakes, ponds, glaciers > 1 km^{2} (0.386 sq mi or 247 acres) and river estuaries.

Burgy (French pronunciation: [byʁʒi]) is a commune in the Saône-et-Loire department in the region of Bourgogne-Franche-Comté in eastern France.

== See also ==
- Communes of the Saône-et-Loire department
