= Saint-Martin-Belle-Roche =

- Commune
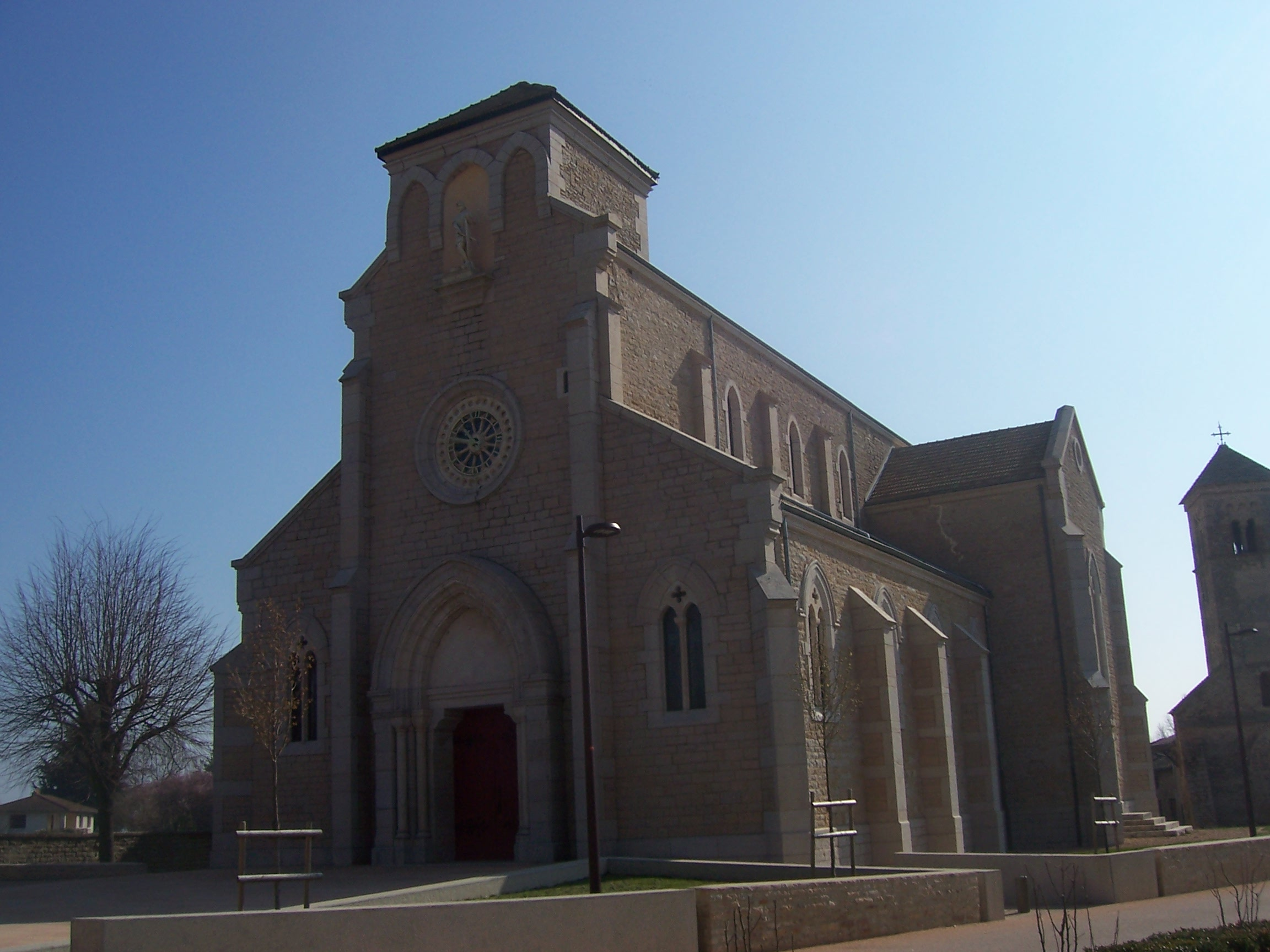
- The church in Saint-Martin-Belle-Roche
- Location of Saint-Martin-Belle-Roche
- Location within France Location within Bourgogne-Franche-Comté
- Coordinates: 46°22′51″N 4°51′20″E
- Country: France
- Region: Bourgogne-Franche-Comté
- Department: Saône-et-Loire
- Arrondissement: Mâcon
- Canton: Hurigny
- Intercommunality: Mâconnais Beaujolais Agglomération
- Area^{1}: 4.54 km^{2} (1.75 sq mi)
- Elevation: 210 m (690 ft)
- Highest elevation: 285 m (935 ft)
- Lowest elevation: 167 m (548 ft)
- Population (2023): 1,385
  - Density: 305/km^{2} (790/sq mi)
- Time zone: UTC+01:00 (CET)
  - Summer (DST): UTC+02:00 (CEST)
- INSEE/Postal code: 71448 /71118
- ^{1} French Land Register data, which excludes lakes, ponds, glaciers > 1 km^{2} (0.386 sq mi or 247 acres) and river estuaries.

Saint-Martin-Belle-Roche (French pronunciation: [sɛ̃ maʁtɛ̃ bɛl ʁɔʃ]; Arpitan: Sant-Martin) is a commune in the Saône-et-Loire department in the region of Bourgogne-Franche-Comté in eastern France.

== See also ==
- Communes of the Saône-et-Loire department
