= Davayé =

- Commune
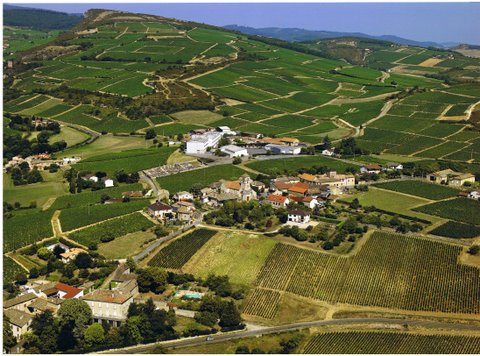
- An aerial view of Davayé

- Coat of arms
- Location of Davayé
- Location within France Location within Bourgogne-Franche-Comté
- Coordinates: 46°18′04″N 4°44′40″E
- Country: France
- Region: Bourgogne-Franche-Comté
- Department: Saône-et-Loire
- Arrondissement: Mâcon
- Canton: La Chapelle-de-Guinchay
- Intercommunality: Mâconnais Beaujolais Agglomération

Government
  - Mayor (2020–2026): Michel du Roure
- Area^{1}: 4.17 km^{2} (1.61 sq mi)
- Elevation: 199 m (653 ft)
- Highest elevation: 325 m (1,066 ft)
- Lowest elevation: 185 m (607 ft)
- Population (2023): 666
  - Density: 160/km^{2} (414/sq mi)
- Time zone: UTC+01:00 (CET)
  - Summer (DST): UTC+02:00 (CEST)
- INSEE/Postal code: 71169 /71960
- ^{1} French Land Register data, which excludes lakes, ponds, glaciers > 1 km^{2} (0.386 sq mi or 247 acres) and river estuaries.

Davayé (French pronunciation: [davaje]) is a commune in the Saône-et-Loire department in the region of Bourgogne-Franche-Comté in eastern France.

== See also ==
- Communes of the Saône-et-Loire department
