= Verzé =

- Commune
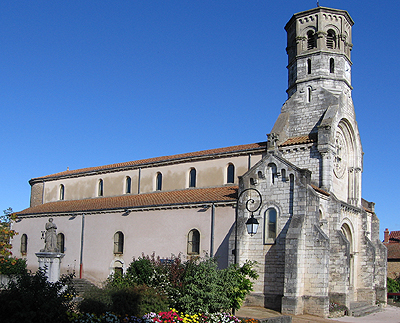
- The church in Verzé
- Location of Verzé
- Location within France Location within Bourgogne-Franche-Comté
- Coordinates: 46°22′38″N 4°44′05″E
- Country: France
- Region: Bourgogne-Franche-Comté
- Department: Saône-et-Loire
- Arrondissement: Mâcon
- Canton: Hurigny
- Intercommunality: Mâconnais Beaujolais Agglomération

Government
  - Mayor (2020–2026): Françoise Large
- Area^{1}: 19.84 km^{2} (7.66 sq mi)
- Elevation: 280 m (920 ft)
- Highest elevation: 590 m (1,940 ft)
- Lowest elevation: 226 m (741 ft)
- Population (2023): 875
  - Density: 44.1/km^{2} (114/sq mi)
- Time zone: UTC+01:00 (CET)
  - Summer (DST): UTC+02:00 (CEST)
- INSEE/Postal code: 71574 /71960
- ^{1} French Land Register data, which excludes lakes, ponds, glaciers > 1 km^{2} (0.386 sq mi or 247 acres) and river estuaries.

Verzé (French pronunciation: [vɛʁze]) is a commune in the Saône-et-Loire department in the region of Bourgogne-Franche-Comté in eastern France.

== See also ==
- Communes of the Saône-et-Loire department
