= Fleurville =

- Commune
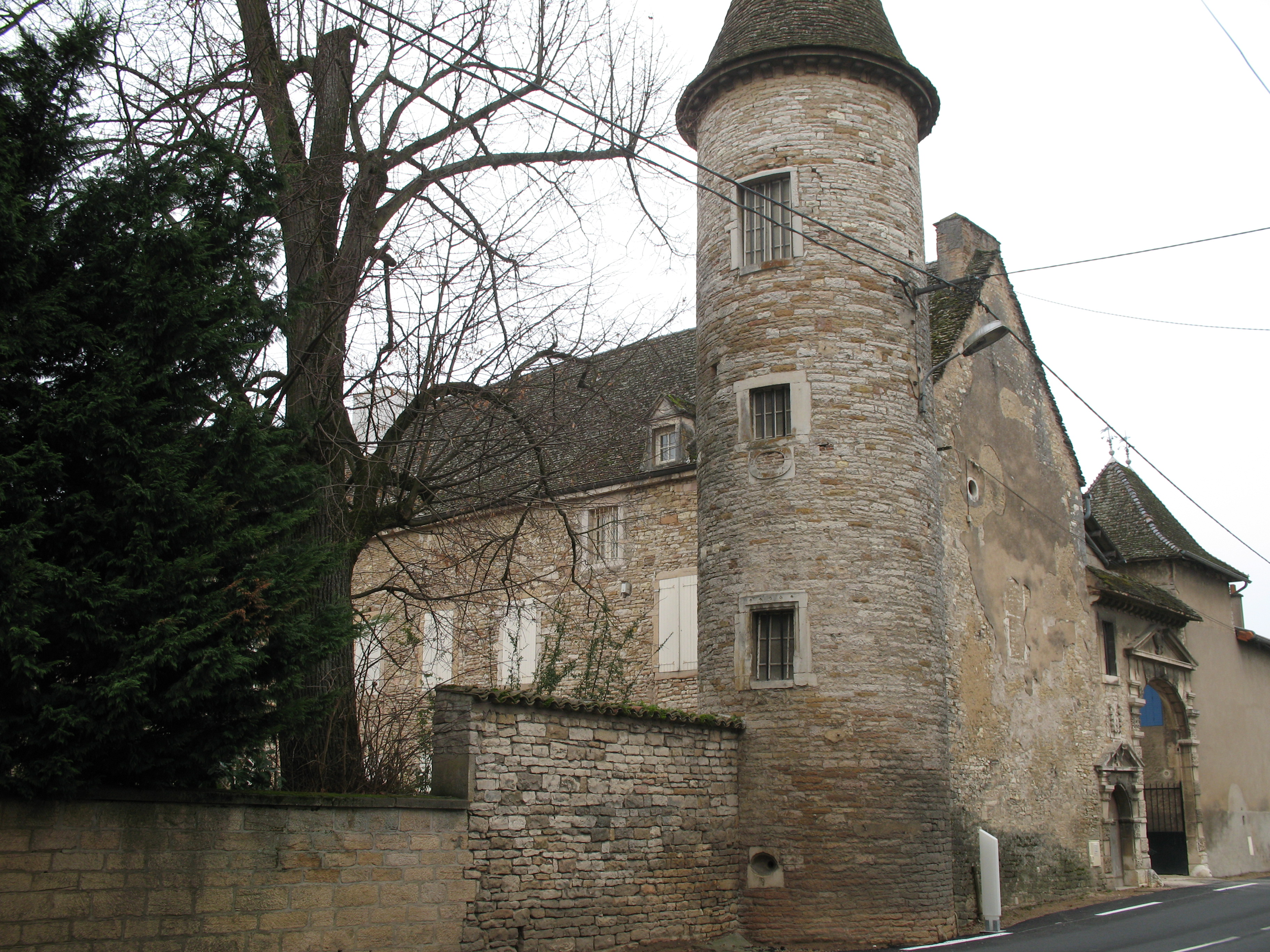
- Chateau
- Location of Fleurville
- Location within France Location within Bourgogne-Franche-Comté
- Coordinates: 46°26′44″N 4°52′53″E
- Country: France
- Region: Bourgogne-Franche-Comté
- Department: Saône-et-Loire
- Arrondissement: Mâcon
- Canton: Hurigny

Government
  - Mayor (2020–2026): Patricia Clément
- Area^{1}: 3.91 km^{2} (1.51 sq mi)
- Elevation: 179 m (587 ft)
- Highest elevation: 205 m (673 ft)
- Lowest elevation: 168 m (551 ft)
- Population (2023): 492
  - Density: 126/km^{2} (326/sq mi)
- Time zone: UTC+01:00 (CET)
  - Summer (DST): UTC+02:00 (CEST)
- INSEE/Postal code: 71591 /71260
- ^{1} French Land Register data, which excludes lakes, ponds, glaciers > 1 km^{2} (0.386 sq mi or 247 acres) and river estuaries.

Fleurville (French pronunciation: [flœʁvil]) is a commune in the Saône-et-Loire department in the region of Bourgogne-Franche-Comté in eastern France.

== See also ==
- Communes of the Saône-et-Loire department
