= Igé, Saône-et-Loire =

Igé
- Commune
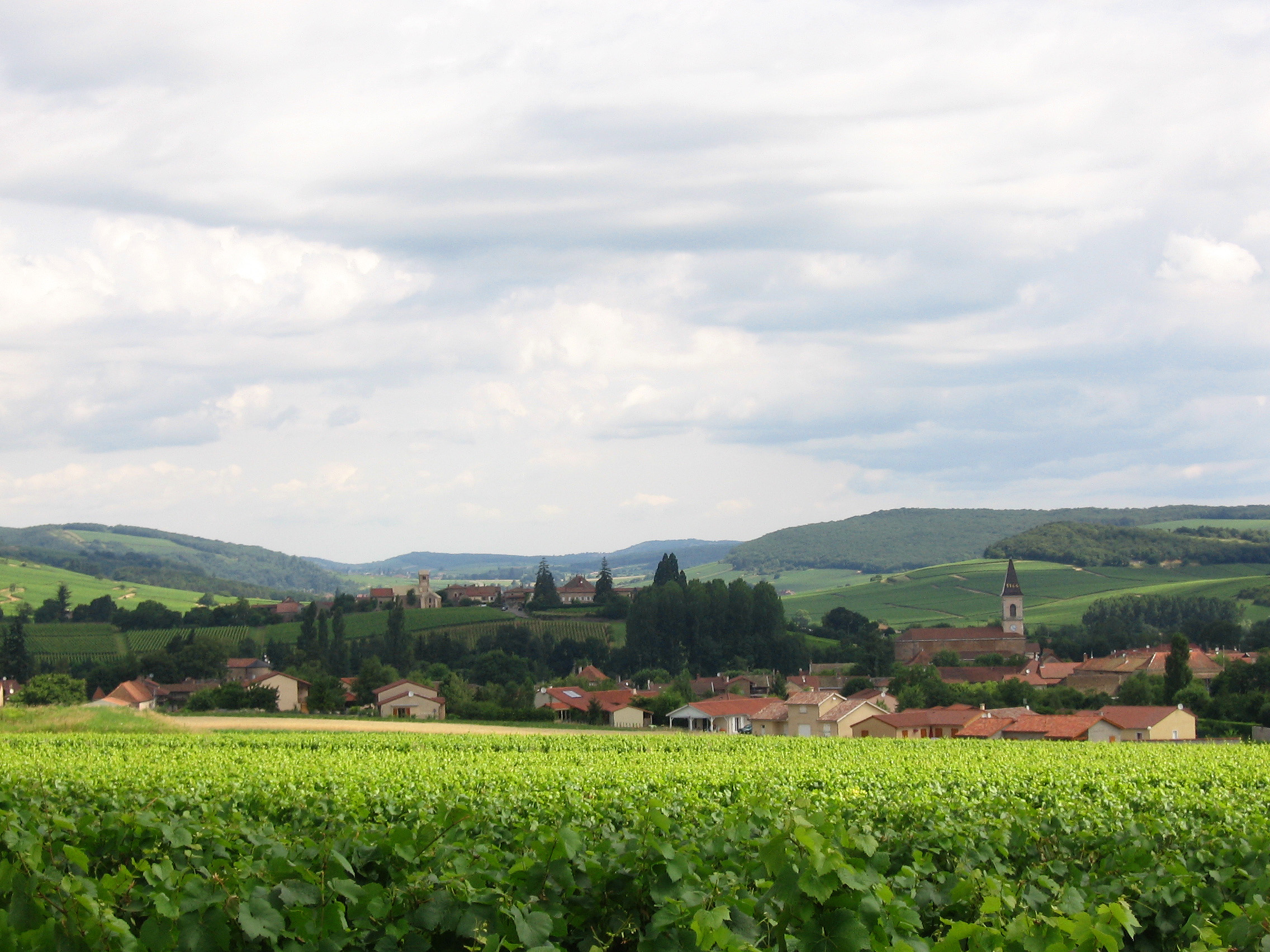
- A general view of Igé
- Location of Igé
- Location within France Location within Bourgogne-Franche-Comté
- Coordinates: 46°23′52″N 4°44′28″E
- Country: France
- Region: Bourgogne-Franche-Comté
- Department: Saône-et-Loire
- Arrondissement: Mâcon
- Canton: Hurigny
- Intercommunality: Mâconnais Beaujolais Agglomération

Government
  - Mayor (2020–2026): Gérard Buono
- Area^{1}: 14.61 km^{2} (5.64 sq mi)
- Elevation: 265 m (869 ft)
- Highest elevation: 600 m (2,000 ft)
- Lowest elevation: 225 m (738 ft)
- Population (2023): 897
  - Density: 61.4/km^{2} (159/sq mi)
- Time zone: UTC+01:00 (CET)
  - Summer (DST): UTC+02:00 (CEST)
- INSEE/Postal code: 71236 /71960
- ^{1} French Land Register data, which excludes lakes, ponds, glaciers > 1 km^{2} (0.386 sq mi or 247 acres) and river estuaries.

Igé (French pronunciation: [iʒe]) is a commune in the Saône-et-Loire department in the region of Bourgogne-Franche-Comté in eastern France.

== Population ==
Historical population
Year	Pop.	±% p.a.
1968	703	—
1975	646	−1.20%
1982	669	+0.50%
1990	729	+1.08%
1999	768	+0.58%
2007	866	+1.51%
2012	853	−0.30%
2017	871	+0.42%
2023	897	+0.49%
Source: INSEE

== See also ==
- Communes of the Saône-et-Loire department
