= Saint-Gengoux-de-Scissé =

- Commune
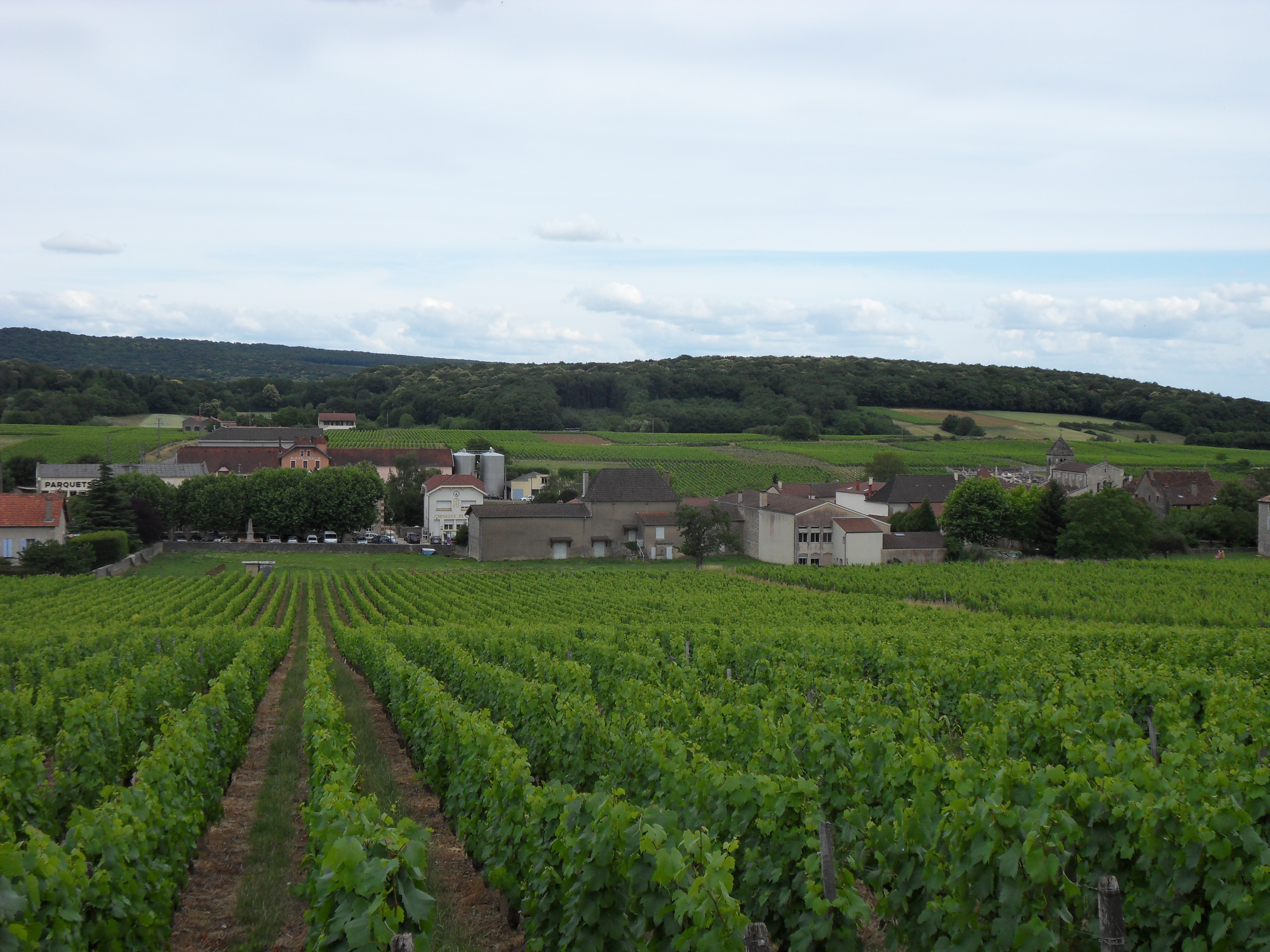
- A general view of Saint-Gengoux-de-Scissé
- Location of Saint-Gengoux-de-Scissé
- Location within France Location within Bourgogne-Franche-Comté
- Coordinates: 46°27′55″N 4°46′35″E
- Country: France
- Region: Bourgogne-Franche-Comté
- Department: Saône-et-Loire
- Arrondissement: Mâcon
- Canton: Hurigny

Government
  - Mayor (2020–2026): Stéphane Jaillet
- Area^{1}: 10.9 km^{2} (4.2 sq mi)
- Elevation: 285 m (935 ft)
- Highest elevation: 530 m (1,740 ft)
- Lowest elevation: 255 m (837 ft)
- Population (2023): 592
  - Density: 54.3/km^{2} (141/sq mi)
- Time zone: UTC+01:00 (CET)
  - Summer (DST): UTC+02:00 (CEST)
- INSEE/Postal code: 71416 /71260
- ^{1} French Land Register data, which excludes lakes, ponds, glaciers > 1 km^{2} (0.386 sq mi or 247 acres) and river estuaries.

Saint-Gengoux-de-Scissé is a commune in the Saône-et-Loire department in the region of Bourgogne-Franche-Comté in eastern France.

== See also ==
- Communes of the Saône-et-Loire department
