= Milly-Lamartine =

- Commune
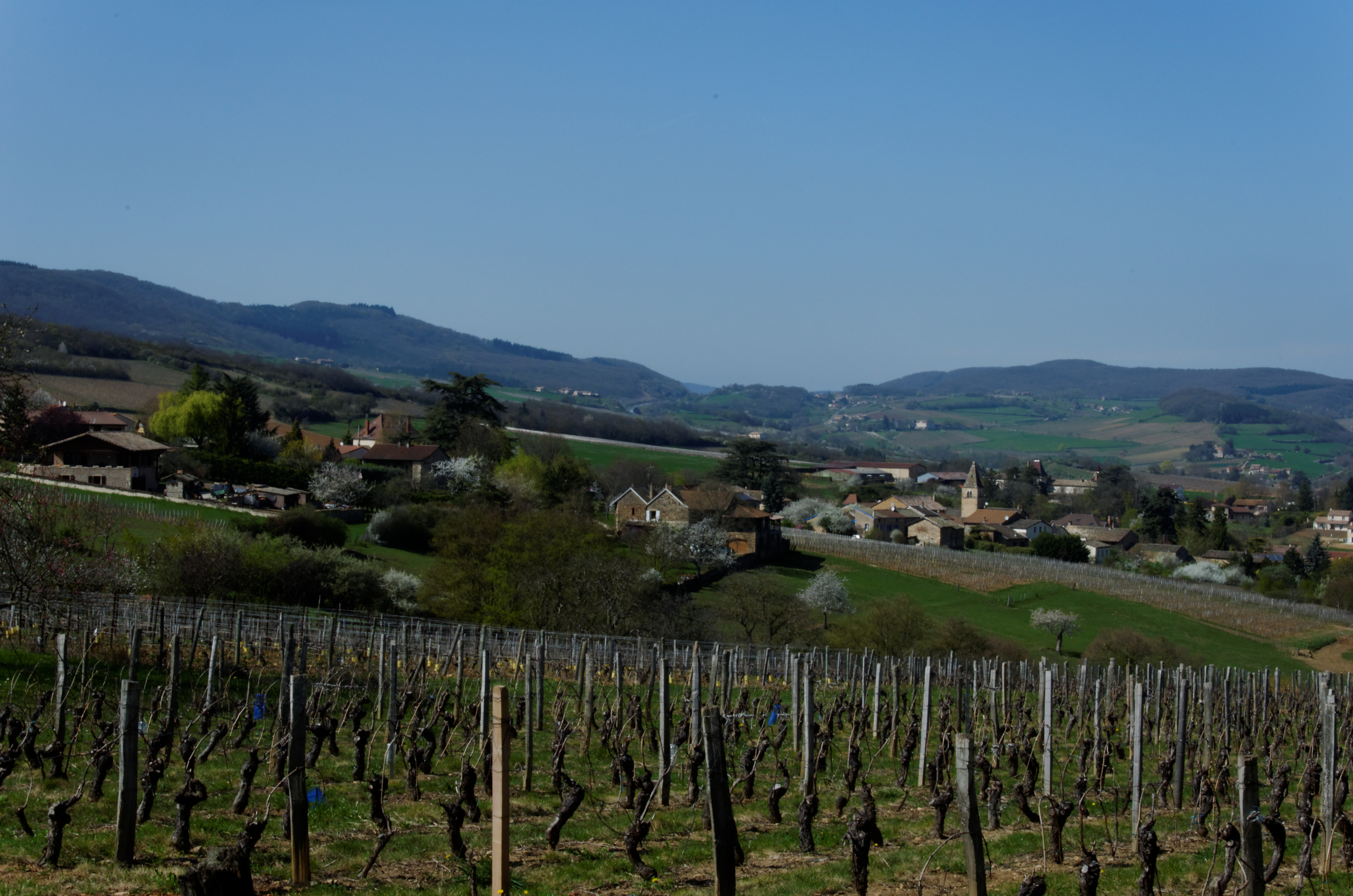
- A general view of Milly-Lamartine
- Location of Milly-Lamartine
- Location within France Location within Bourgogne-Franche-Comté
- Coordinates: 46°20′56″N 4°41′54″E
- Country: France
- Region: Bourgogne-Franche-Comté
- Department: Saône-et-Loire
- Arrondissement: Mâcon
- Canton: Hurigny
- Intercommunality: Mâconnais Beaujolais Agglomération
- Area^{1}: 2.88 km^{2} (1.11 sq mi)
- Elevation: 280 m (920 ft)
- Highest elevation: 506 m (1,660 ft)
- Lowest elevation: 237 m (778 ft)
- Population (2023): 353
  - Density: 123/km^{2} (317/sq mi)
- Time zone: UTC+01:00 (CET)
  - Summer (DST): UTC+02:00 (CEST)
- INSEE/Postal code: 71299 /71960
- ^{1} French Land Register data, which excludes lakes, ponds, glaciers > 1 km^{2} (0.386 sq mi or 247 acres) and river estuaries.

Milly-Lamartine is a commune in the Saône-et-Loire department in the region of Bourgogne-Franche-Comté in eastern France. It is the home-town of Alphonse de Lamartine, the famous French poet and writer.

== See also ==
- Communes of the Saône-et-Loire department
