= La Roche-Vineuse =

- Commune
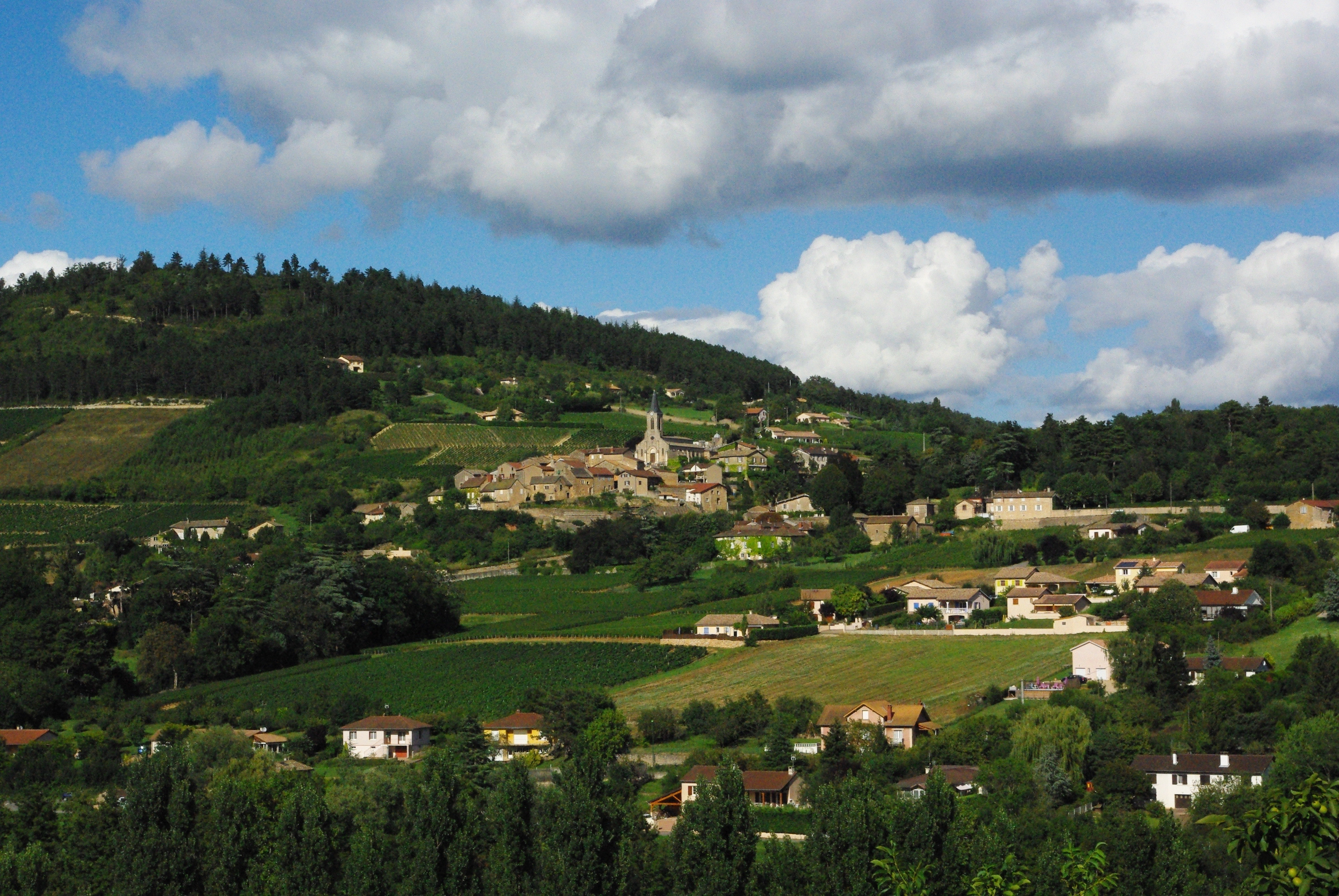
- A general view of La Roche-Vineuse
- Location of La Roche-Vineuse
- Location within France Location within Bourgogne-Franche-Comté
- Coordinates: 46°20′37″N 4°43′48″E
- Country: France
- Region: Bourgogne-Franche-Comté
- Department: Saône-et-Loire
- Arrondissement: Mâcon
- Canton: Hurigny
- Intercommunality: Mâconnais Beaujolais Agglomération
- Area^{1}: 11.96 km^{2} (4.62 sq mi)
- Elevation: 238 m (781 ft)
- Highest elevation: 422 m (1,385 ft)
- Lowest elevation: 212 m (696 ft)
- Population (2023): 1,570
  - Density: 131/km^{2} (340/sq mi)
- Time zone: UTC+01:00 (CET)
  - Summer (DST): UTC+02:00 (CEST)
- INSEE/Postal code: 71371 /71960
- ^{1} French Land Register data, which excludes lakes, ponds, glaciers > 1 km^{2} (0.386 sq mi or 247 acres) and river estuaries.

La Roche-Vineuse (French pronunciation: [la ʁɔʃ vinøz]) is a commune in the Saône-et-Loire department in the region of Bourgogne-Franche-Comté in eastern France.

== See also ==
- Communes of the Saône-et-Loire department
