= Bissy-la-Mâconnaise =

- Commune
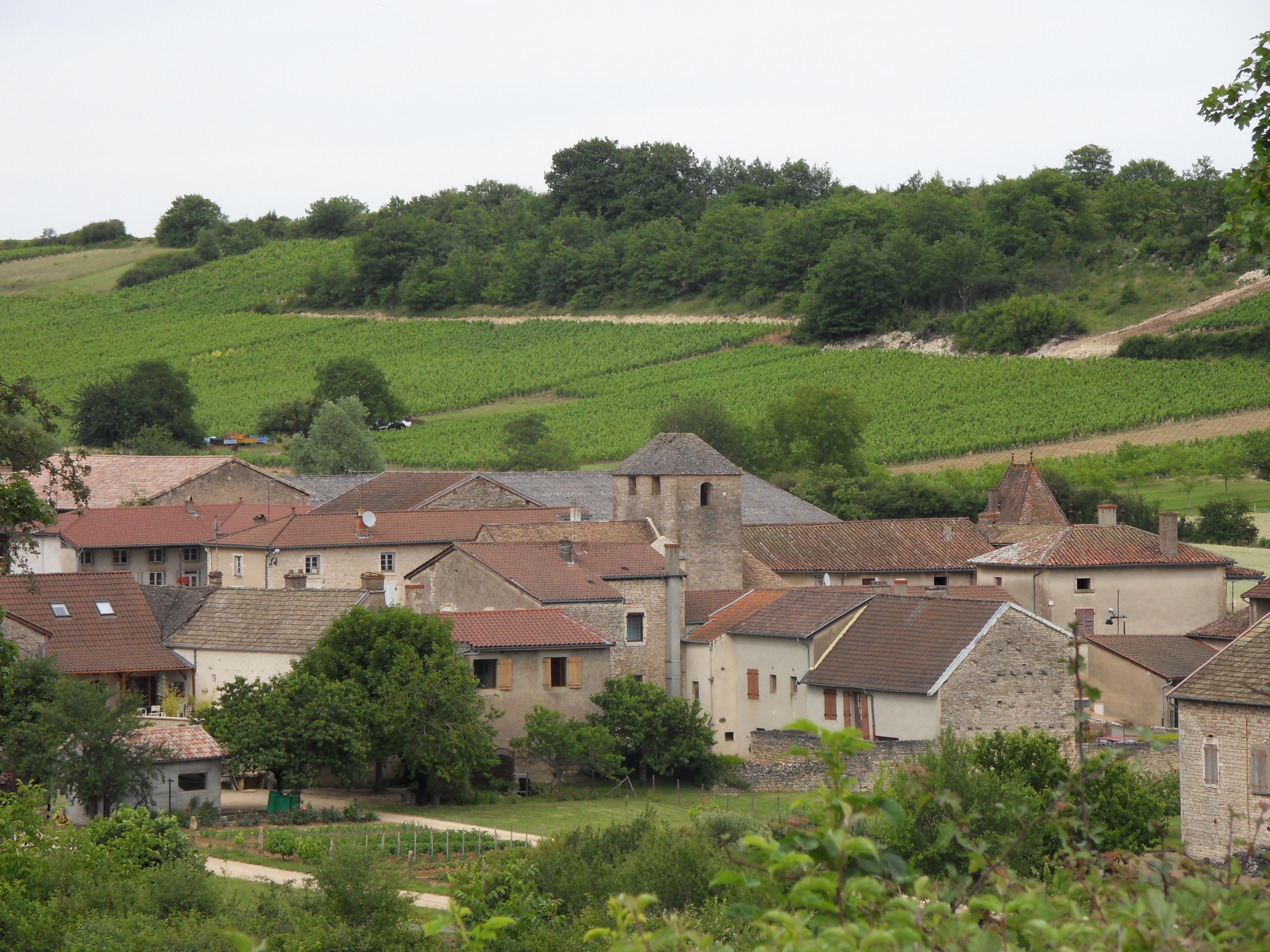
- Location of Bissy-la-Mâconnaise
- Location within France Location within Bourgogne-Franche-Comté
- Coordinates: 46°28′55″N 4°47′21″E
- Country: France
- Region: Bourgogne-Franche-Comté
- Department: Saône-et-Loire
- Arrondissement: Mâcon
- Canton: Hurigny

Government
  - Mayor (2020–2026): Marc Sangoy
- Area^{1}: 4.96 km^{2} (1.92 sq mi)
- Elevation: 260 m (850 ft)
- Highest elevation: 530 m (1,740 ft)
- Lowest elevation: 243 m (797 ft)
- Population (2023): 201
  - Density: 40.5/km^{2} (105/sq mi)
- Time zone: UTC+01:00 (CET)
  - Summer (DST): UTC+02:00 (CEST)
- INSEE/Postal code: 71035 /71260
- ^{1} French Land Register data, which excludes lakes, ponds, glaciers > 1 km^{2} (0.386 sq mi or 247 acres) and river estuaries.

Bissy-la-Mâconnaise (French pronunciation: [bisi la makɔnɛz]) is a commune in the Saône-et-Loire department in the region of Bourgogne-Franche-Comté in eastern France.

== Population ==
Historical population
Year	Pop.	±% p.a.
1968	165	—
1975	149	−1.45%
1982	151	+0.19%
1990	158	+0.57%
1999	177	+1.27%
2007	182	+0.35%
2012	209	+2.81%
2017	205	−0.39%
2023	201	−0.33%
Source: INSEE

== See also ==
- Communes of the Saône-et-Loire department
