= Lugny, Saône-et-Loire =

Lugny
- Commune
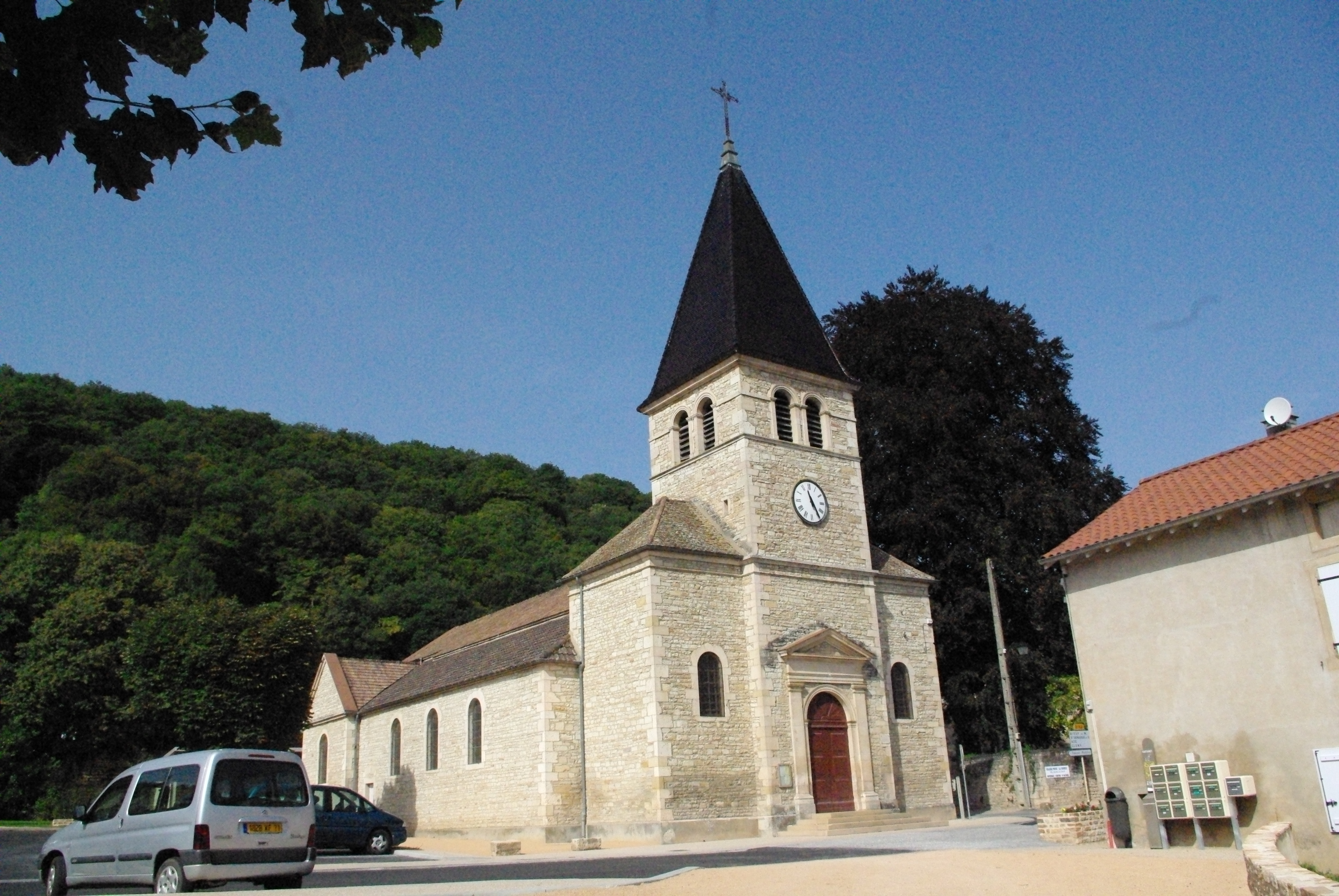
- The church in Lugny

- Coat of arms
- Location of Lugny
- Location within France Location within Bourgogne-Franche-Comté
- Coordinates: 46°28′24″N 4°48′37″E
- Country: France
- Region: Bourgogne-Franche-Comté
- Department: Saône-et-Loire
- Arrondissement: Mâcon
- Canton: Hurigny

Government
  - Mayor (2020–2026): Guy Galea
- Area^{1}: 13.88 km^{2} (5.36 sq mi)
- Elevation: 226 m (741 ft)
- Highest elevation: 420 m (1,380 ft)
- Lowest elevation: 201 m (659 ft)
- Population (2023): 845
  - Density: 60.9/km^{2} (158/sq mi)
- Time zone: UTC+01:00 (CET)
  - Summer (DST): UTC+02:00 (CEST)
- INSEE/Postal code: 71267 /71260
- ^{1} French Land Register data, which excludes lakes, ponds, glaciers > 1 km^{2} (0.386 sq mi or 247 acres) and river estuaries.

Lugny (French pronunciation: [lyɲi]) is a commune in the Saône-et-Loire department in the region of Bourgogne-Franche-Comté in eastern France.

== See also ==
- Communes of the Saône-et-Loire department
