= Château de Corcelle =

Castle in Bourgogne-Franche-Comté, France

Coordinates: 46°21′47″N 4°38′21″E

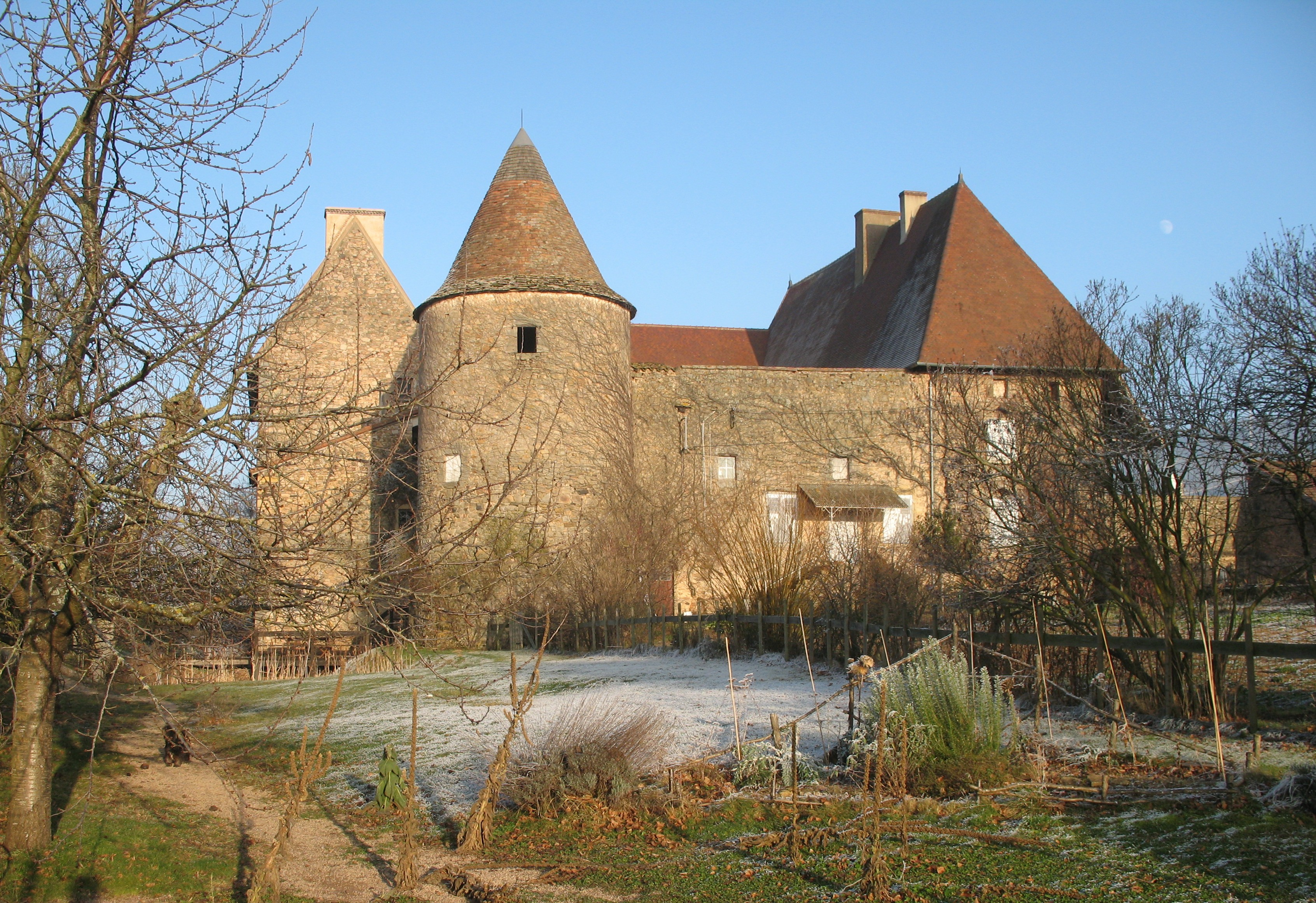

The Château de Corcelle is a castle located in the commune of Bourgvilain in Saône-et-Loire département of France, on a small plateau dominating the valley of the Valouze.

== Description ==
The buildings of the castle are ordered around a rectangular interior court and are connected by stretches of curtain walls; they are girded on three sides by partly filled-in moats. This quadrilateral is flanked by round towers on north east and south west corners. Against the eastern curtain wall, the principal main building is flanked on its eastern façade, opening onto the farmyard, by a small rectangular building. A cart gate under a semicircular arch next to a pedestrian door under a flat arch, give access to the farmyard.

The castle is private property and not open to the public. It has been listed as a monument historique by the French Ministry of Culture.

== History ==
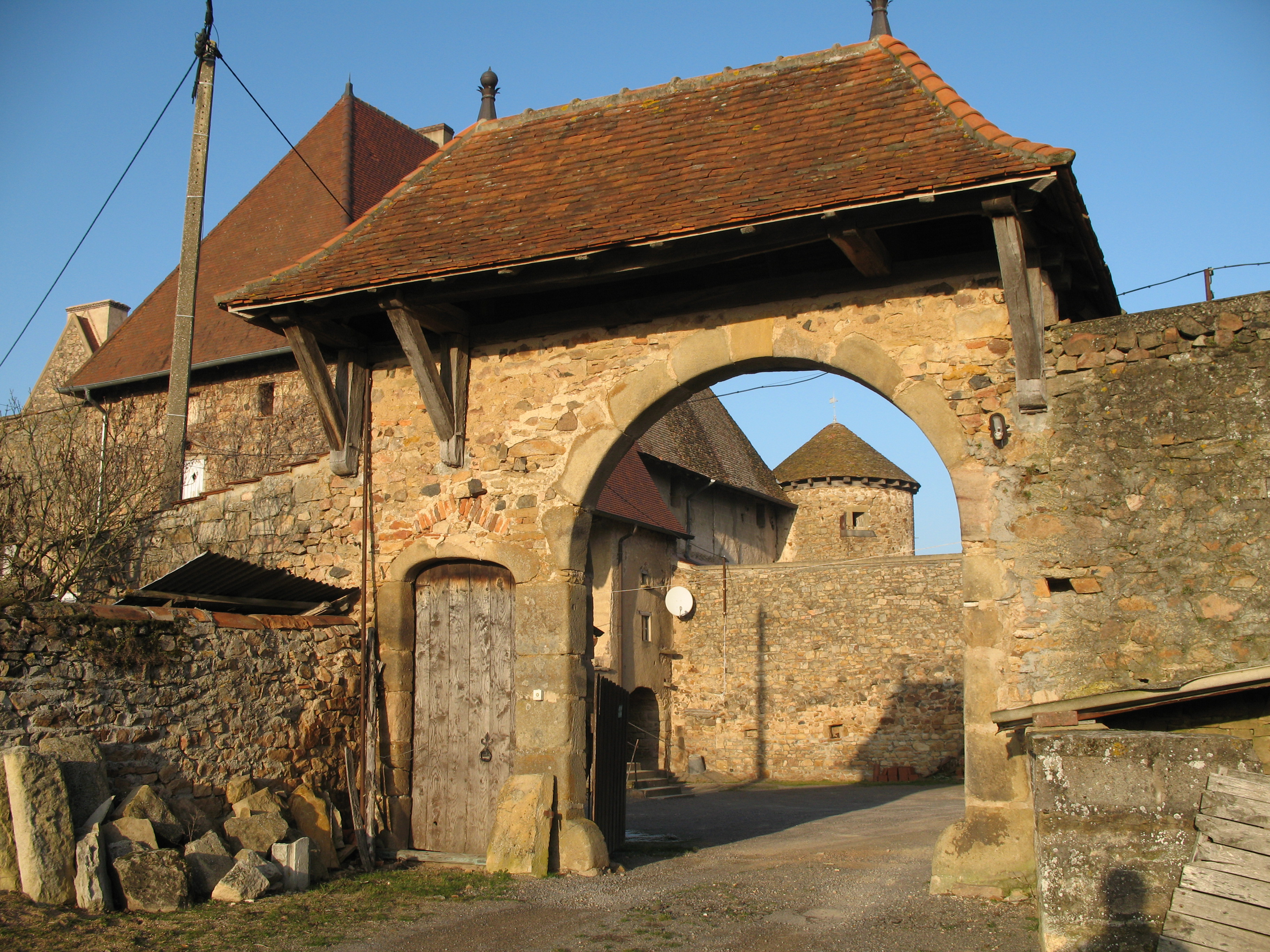
Cart gate at the Château de Corcelle

- 984: the name of Corcelle is cited in a map of Cluny
- from 14th to beginning of 16th century : the Verrey family were lords of Corcelle; the castle seems to have been constructed during this period
- 1520: the fiefdom passed to the Busseul Saint-Sernin family
- 1642: sale of the castle to Laurent de Laube
- 1780: by marriage to Jeanne-Antoinette de Laube, it passed to Louis de Leusse
- 1794: after the preceding was decapitated, his widow sold the property to the Martinot brothers, one of whom was mayor of Bourgvilain and a tax farmer-general

=== Seigneurs and owners of Corcelle ===
- Jean de Verrey (around 1375)
- Guillaume de Verrey (around 1421)
- Pierre de Verrey, son of the preceding, seigneur of Corcelle (around 1460)
- Philibert de Verrey (around 1512)
- Jean de Verrey (around 1520), undoubtedly son of the preceding
- Philibert de Busseul Saint-Sernin (middle of the 16th century)
- Charles de Busseul Saint-Sernin, son of the preceding, Bailli of Mâcon (second half of the 16th century)
- Laurent de Busseul Saint-Sernin, son of the preceding, baron of Corcelle (start of the 17th century)
- Marc-Antoine de Busseul Saint-Sernin, son of the preceding, baron of Corcelle (first half of the 17th century)
- Laurent de Laube, baron of Corcelle (middles of the 17th century)
- Philibert-Hubert de Laube, son of the preceding, baron of Corcelle (died around 1715)
- André-Emmanuel de Laube, son of the preceding, baron of Corcelle (1684–1754)
- Marie de Laube, daughter of the preceding, baroness of Corcelle (died 1780) and widow of Jean-Henri de Laube (1717–1747), her cousin
- Jeanne-Antoinette de Laube, daughter of the preceding (1744–1831)
- Louis de Leusse, husband of the preceding (1737–1794)
- Martinot family, from 1794

== See also ==
- List of castles in France

== Bibliography ==
- R. Oursel, Inventaire Départemental - Canton de Tramayes (1974)
- F. Perraud, Les environs de Mâcon (1912)
