= Matour =

- Commune
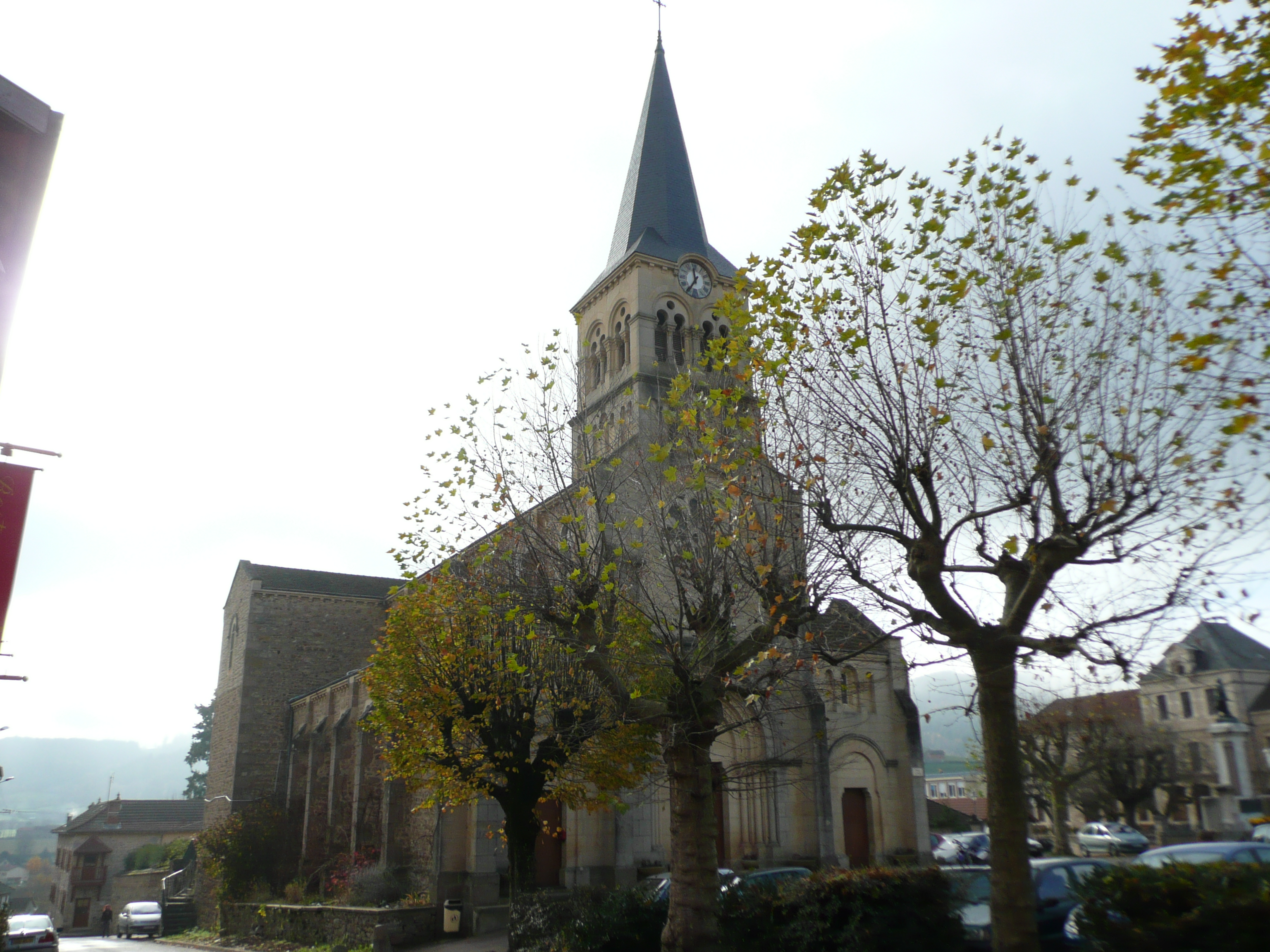
- The church in Matour

- Coat of arms
- Location of Matour
- Location within France Location within Bourgogne-Franche-Comté
- Coordinates: 46°18′28″N 4°29′00″E
- Country: France
- Region: Bourgogne-Franche-Comté
- Department: Saône-et-Loire
- Arrondissement: Mâcon
- Canton: La Chapelle-de-Guinchay

Government
  - Mayor (2020–2026): Thierry Igonnet
- Area^{1}: 27.99 km^{2} (10.81 sq mi)
- Elevation: 450 m (1,480 ft)
- Highest elevation: 769 m (2,523 ft)
- Lowest elevation: 328 m (1,076 ft)
- Population (2023): 1,161
  - Density: 41.48/km^{2} (107.4/sq mi)
- Time zone: UTC+01:00 (CET)
  - Summer (DST): UTC+02:00 (CEST)
- INSEE/Postal code: 71289 /71520
- Website: www.matour.fr
- ^{1} French Land Register data, which excludes lakes, ponds, glaciers > 1 km^{2} (0.386 sq mi or 247 acres) and river estuaries.

Matour (French pronunciation: [matuʁ]) is a commune in the department of Saône-et-Loire in Bourgogne-Franche-Comté, France. Its territory is classified Natura 2000. The commune is located in a zone de revitalisation rurale (fragile municipality with some tax assistance).

== Geography ==
=== Topography ===
Matour is a village with a medium and low altitude. The highest point is located to the north-west in the mountain range of the Mont Saint-Cyr and reaches 769 meters of altitude, the lowest point being 328 meters. Very rugged, the village is dominated by multiple rounded mountains and capped with forests as:

- The highest point of the commune is 769 meters;

- La Grand Roche in the forest of Botte, 669 meters;

- The Roche de Chaud on the top of Auveau and Etiveau, 665 meters;

- The Roche de la Naude in the north, 614 meters;

- The Signal d'Argaud in the south-east, 559 meters;

- The Montillet, 587 meters;

- The Roche de Trécourt, 511 meters;

Most of the rivers, such as the Baize, Petit Moulin and Trécourt streams, feed the Grosne valley to the east, which is part of the Rhône river. However, to the west, the col de la Croix d'Auterre (557 m) is the line of separation of the waters between the Mediterranean and the Atlantic Ocean.

=== Geology ===
The main part of the municipality of Matour rests on an ancient granite basement dating from the Paleozoic era (Tournaisian, Viséen) similar to the geology of a part of the Morvan massif and that of Forez. The local geology is closely related to that of the Massif Central of which it forms the north-eastern edge. To the east of the commune, there are allochthonous sedimentary deposits at the level of the forest of Botte and certain sectors of the mounts Saint Cyr. In the south, the summit of the hills is made up of peralkaline tholeiitic magmatic rocks linked to an older (Devonian) volcanism and raised by the folding of the eastern part of the Massif Central during the formation of the Alps.

=== Sector ===
==== Distribution of population ====
The commune of Matour has a human occupation similar to all this part of Burgundy. It is a dispersed and even very dispersed habitat with a borough that concentrates most of the activities despite the decline of the commune. The majority of the hamlets are groups of farms.

The municipality also has a more urban habitat with the construction of subdivisions and housing complexes as in Trécourt or in the southern part of the center.

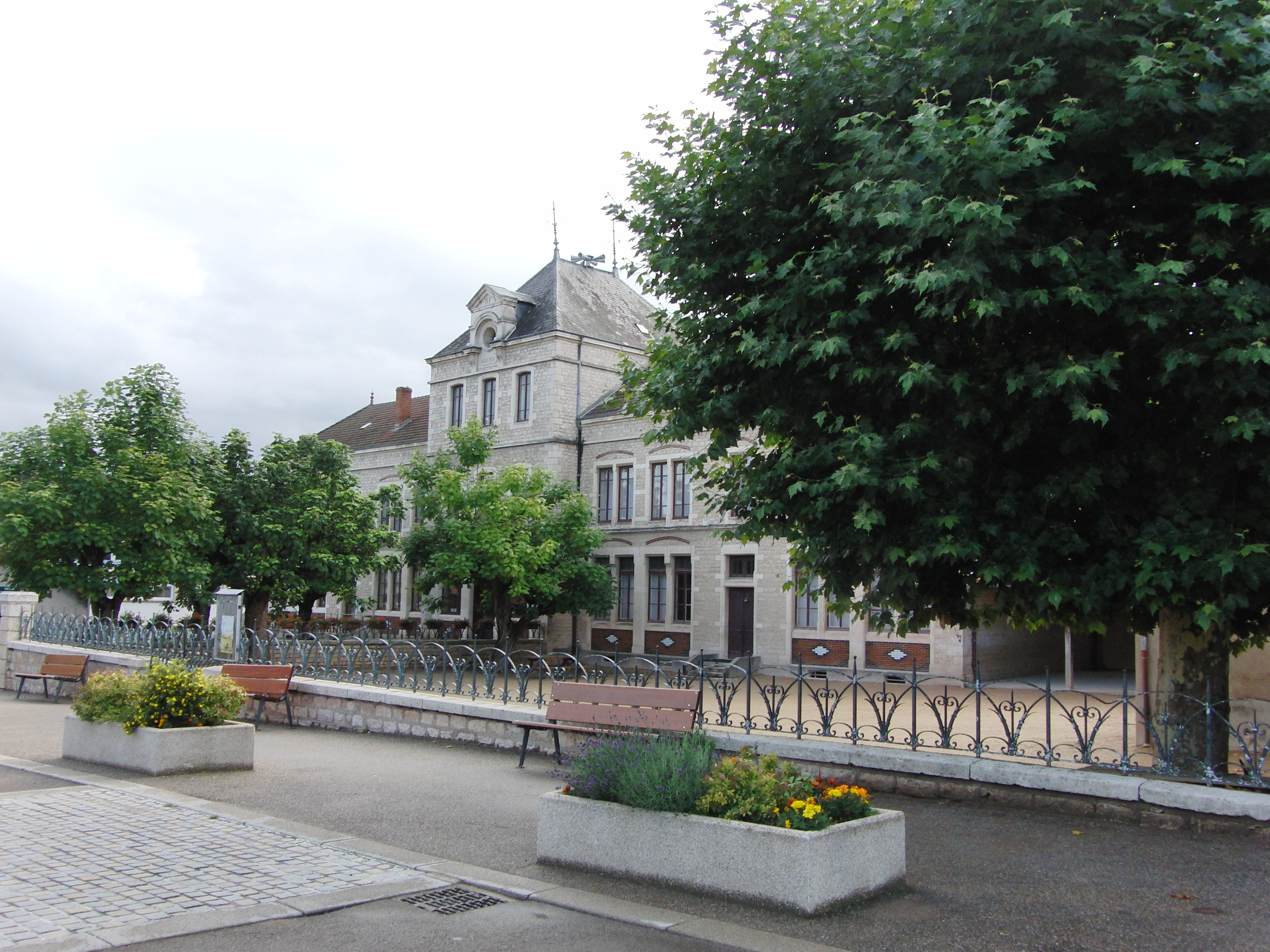
City hall of Matour

In addition, the municipality has launched a demolition operation, in order to demolish some buildings of the center, very dilapidated.

== Education ==
The village has a nursery school, a primary school, and a college.

== Population ==
Historical population

Year	Pop.	±% p.a.
1793	1,922	—
1800	2,062	+1.01%
1806	2,032	−0.24%
1821	2,153	+0.39%
1831	2,246	+0.42%
1836	2,330	+0.74%
1841	2,331	+0.01%
1846	2,362	+0.26%
1851	2,436	+0.62%
1856	2,502	+0.54%
1861	2,336	−1.36%
1866	2,270	−0.57%
1872	2,258	−0.09%
1876	2,222	−0.40%
1881	2,167	−0.50%
1886	2,201	+0.31%
1891	2,020	−1.70%
1896	1,884	−1.38%
1901	1,744	−1.53%

Year	Pop.	±% p.a.
1906	1,640	−1.22%
1911	1,631	−0.11%
1921	1,574	−0.36%
1926	1,516	−0.75%
1931	1,415	−1.37%
1936	1,302	−1.65%
1946	1,258	−0.34%
1954	1,181	−0.79%
1962	1,101	−0.87%
1968	1,206	+1.53%
1975	1,207	+0.01%
1982	1,231	+0.28%
1990	1,003	−2.53%
1999	998	−0.06%
2007	1,074	+0.92%
2012	1,043	−0.58%
2017	1,119	+1.42%
2023	1,161	+0.62%

Source: EHESS and INSEE

== Places and monuments ==
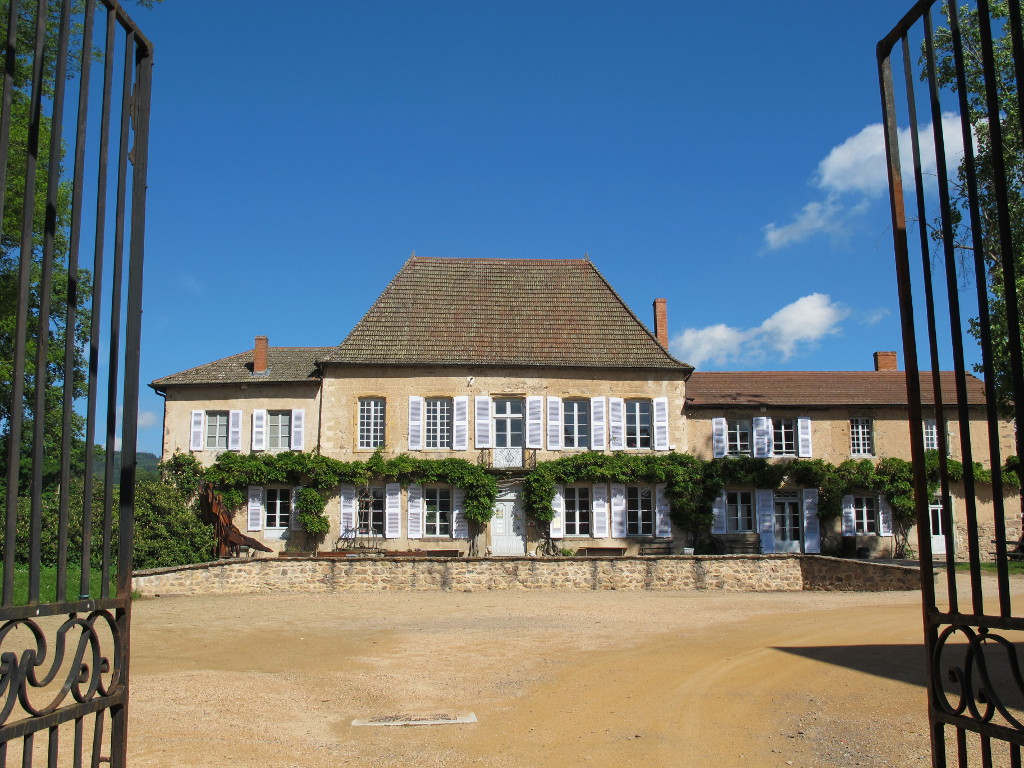
Maison des patrimoines

- Maison des patrimoines: Ecomuseum and park of contemporary sculptures, inaugurated in February 2001. The ecomuseum is housed in a mansion whose older sections date to the 15th century (community ovens). The first owners of the estate were the family de Foutras, who used it as hunting lodge for its proximity to the forest. In the 18th century the de Foutras became the counts of Matour and Chateauthiers. After the family went bankrupt, the Marquis of Castellane became the new owner. He added symmetrical pavilions with high roofs. Les de Lachaume, a family of notaries and tax prosecutors, were the owners in the 19th century. They set up the property for hunting parties and established the current layout of the grounds. The Maison des Patrimoines has over 800m^{2} of exhibition space there, covering history, folk tradition, and the environment.
- Church of Saint John the Baptist: Built between 1863 and 1868 in the town's main square. Under the old regime it belonged to the diocese of Autun and the parish of Bois-Sainte-Marie. The construction of the present church was carried out under the authority of André Berthier, an architect in Mâcon. The bell tower of the church was struck by lightning on August 4, 1910. The church has a five-aisle nave with flanking collateral altars. The choir has an ambulatory without radiating side-chapels.

== Tourism ==
One of the offices of the Office du Tourisme du Haut-Clunisois is located in the center of the village on the square of the church.

Matour is the second tourist hostel in the community of communes, so it has reception facilities: guest rooms, group lodgings, and campground.

A swimming pool was opened in the late 1960s and, during its modernization phase, was equipped with a solar heating system.

== Personality ==
- Caroline Otero (known as La Belle Otero), a famous courtesan of the early twentieth century, lived in Matour between 1939 and 1948 (her companion was a native of the village).

== See also ==
- Communes of Saône-et-Loire
- Dompierre-les-Ormes
