= Serrières =

Serrières may refer to the following places:

== France ==
- Serrières, Ardèche, in the department of Ardèche
- Serrières, Saône-et-Loire, in the department of Saône-et-Loire
- Serrières-de-Briord, in the department of Ain
- Serrières-en-Chautagne, in the department of Savoie
- Serrières-sur-Ain, in the department of Ain

== Switzerland ==
- Serrières, Neuchâtel, in the canton of Neuchâtel
  - Stade de Serrières, a football stadium
