= Germolles-sur-Grosne =

- Commune
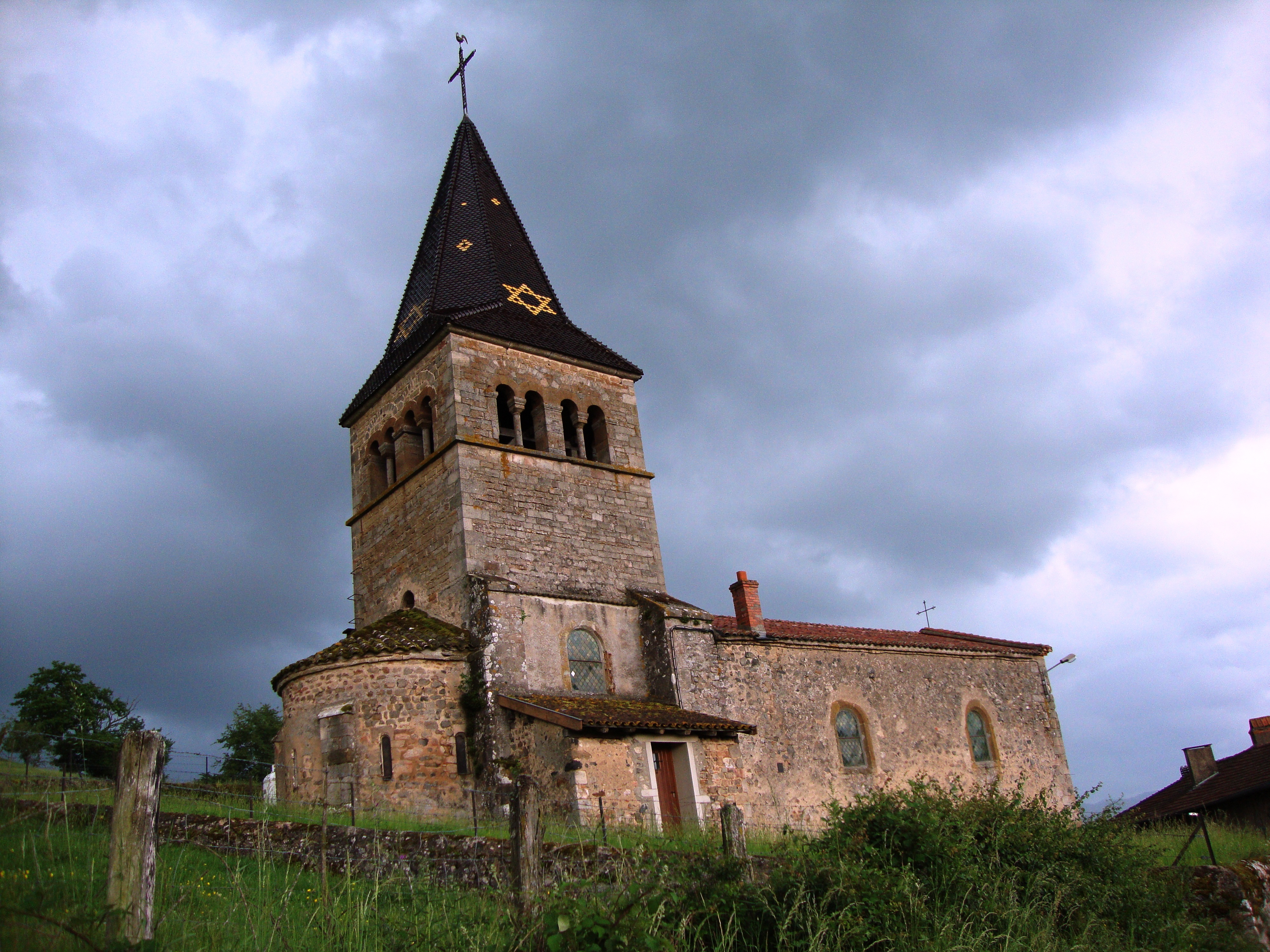
- The church in Germolles-sur-Grosne
- Location of Germolles-sur-Grosne
- Location within France Location within Bourgogne-Franche-Comté
- Coordinates: 46°16′49″N 4°35′26″E
- Country: France
- Region: Bourgogne-Franche-Comté
- Department: Saône-et-Loire
- Arrondissement: Mâcon
- Canton: La Chapelle-de-Guinchay
- Area^{1}: 7.23 km^{2} (2.79 sq mi)
- Elevation: 250 m (820 ft)
- Highest elevation: 626 m (2,054 ft)
- Lowest elevation: 336 m (1,102 ft)
- Population (2023): 135
  - Density: 18.7/km^{2} (48.4/sq mi)
- Time zone: UTC+01:00 (CET)
  - Summer (DST): UTC+02:00 (CEST)
- INSEE/Postal code: 71217 /71520
- ^{1} French Land Register data, which excludes lakes, ponds, glaciers > 1 km^{2} (0.386 sq mi or 247 acres) and river estuaries.

Germolles-sur-Grosne (French pronunciation: [ʒɛʁmɔl syʁ ɡʁon], literally Germolles on Grosne) is a commune in the Saône-et-Loire department in the region of Bourgogne-Franche-Comté in eastern France. It lies on both sides of the Grosne River.

== See also ==
- Communes of the Saône-et-Loire department
