= Saint-Amour-Bellevue =

- Commune
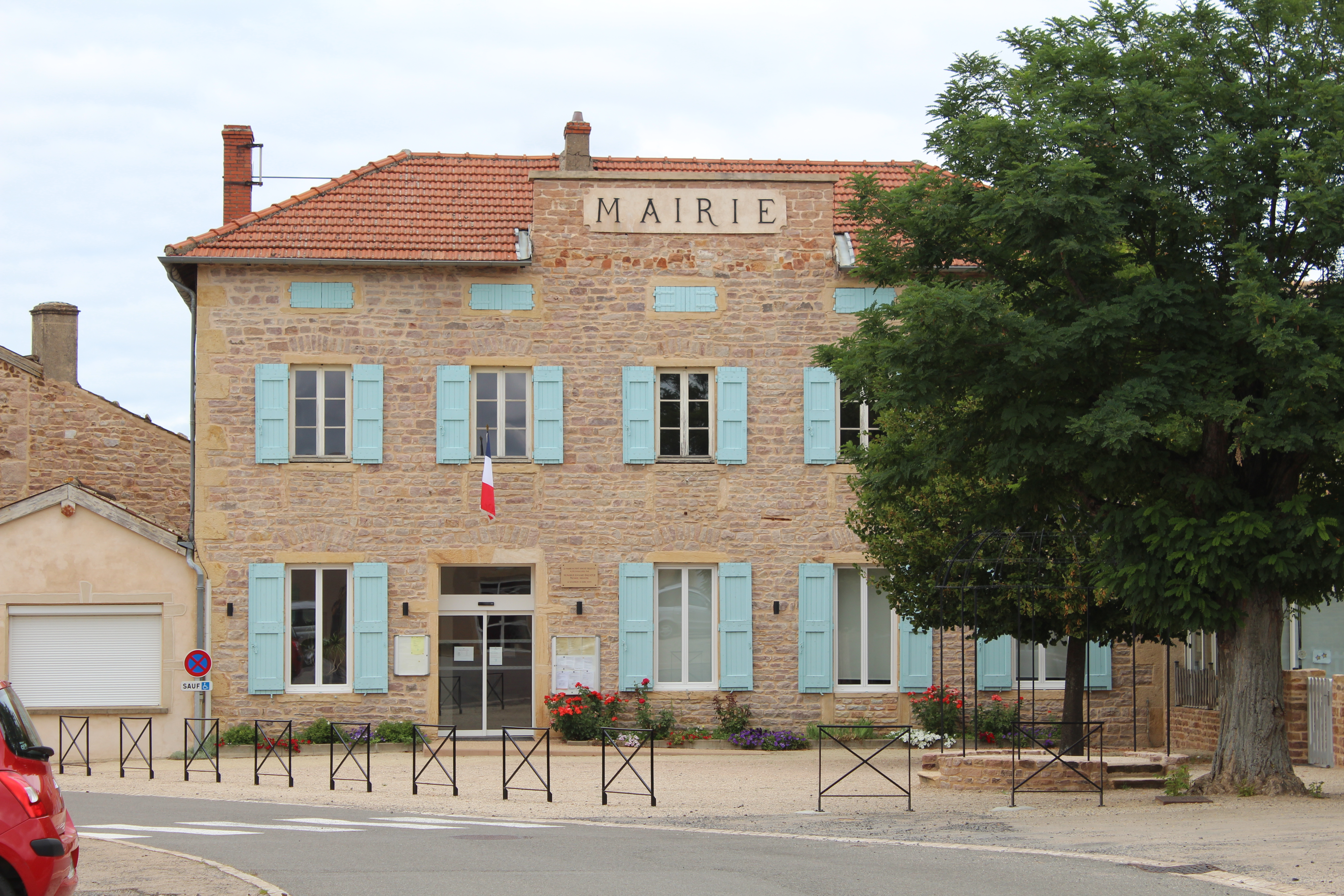
- The town hall in Saint-Amour-Bellevue
- Location of Saint-Amour-Bellevue
- Location within France Location within Bourgogne-Franche-Comté
- Coordinates: 46°14′45″N 4°44′39″E
- Country: France
- Region: Bourgogne-Franche-Comté
- Department: Saône-et-Loire
- Arrondissement: Mâcon
- Canton: La Chapelle-de-Guinchay
- Intercommunality: Mâconnais Beaujolais Agglomération
- Area^{1}: 5.09 km^{2} (1.97 sq mi)
- Elevation: 306 m (1,004 ft)
- Highest elevation: 475 m (1,558 ft)
- Lowest elevation: 202 m (663 ft)
- Population (2023): 609
  - Density: 120/km^{2} (310/sq mi)
- Time zone: UTC+01:00 (CET)
  - Summer (DST): UTC+02:00 (CEST)
- INSEE/Postal code: 71385 /71570
- ^{1} French Land Register data, which excludes lakes, ponds, glaciers > 1 km^{2} (0.386 sq mi or 247 acres) and river estuaries.

Saint-Amour-Bellevue (French pronunciation: [sɛ̃t‿amuʁ bɛlvy]) is a commune in the Saône-et-Loire department in the region of Bourgogne-Franche-Comté in eastern France.

== Twin cities ==
- Durbuy (Belgium)

== See also ==
- Communes of the Saône-et-Loire department
