= Trambly =

- Commune
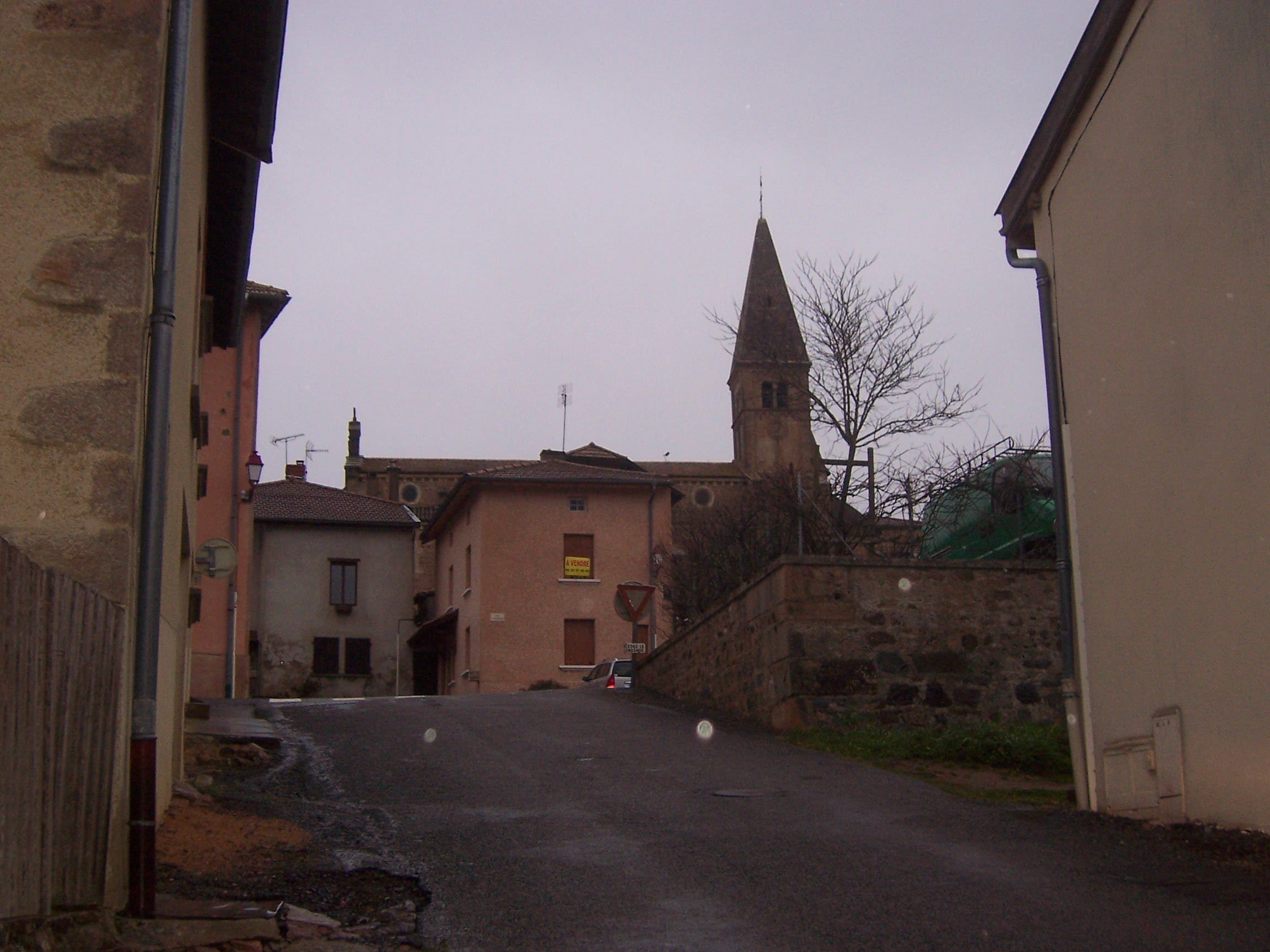
- The church and surroundings in Trambly
- Location of Trambly
- Location within France Location within Bourgogne-Franche-Comté
- Coordinates: 46°19′41″N 4°32′02″E
- Country: France
- Region: Bourgogne-Franche-Comté
- Department: Saône-et-Loire
- Arrondissement: Mâcon
- Canton: La Chapelle-de-Guinchay
- Intercommunality: CC Saint-Cyr Mère Boitier entre Charolais et Mâconnais

Government
  - Mayor (2020–2026): Bernard Perrin
- Area^{1}: 12.08 km^{2} (4.66 sq mi)
- Elevation: 350 m (1,150 ft)
- Highest elevation: 570 m (1,870 ft)
- Lowest elevation: 289 m (948 ft)
- Population (2023): 394
  - Density: 32.6/km^{2} (84.5/sq mi)
- Time zone: UTC+01:00 (CET)
  - Summer (DST): UTC+02:00 (CEST)
- INSEE/Postal code: 71546 /71520
- ^{1} French Land Register data, which excludes lakes, ponds, glaciers > 1 km^{2} (0.386 sq mi or 247 acres) and river estuaries.

Trambly (French pronunciation: [tʁɑ̃bli]) is a commune in the Saône-et-Loire department in the region of Bourgogne-Franche-Comté in eastern France.

== Geography ==
The Grosne forms part of the commune's eastern border.

== See also ==
- Communes of the Saône-et-Loire department
