= Tramayes =

- Commune
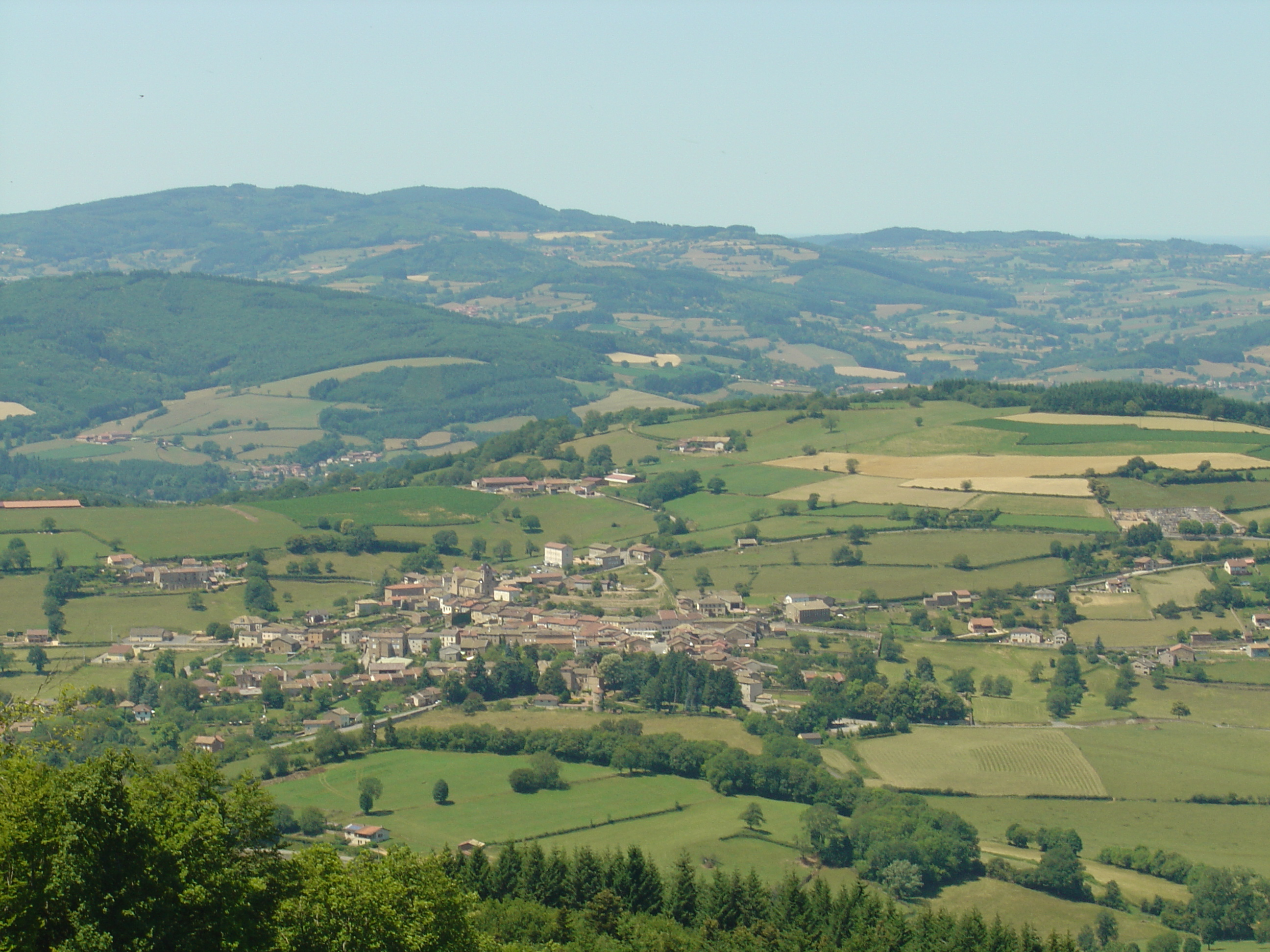
- A general view of Tramayes
- Location of Tramayes
- Location within France Location within Bourgogne-Franche-Comté
- Coordinates: 46°18′31″N 4°36′11″E
- Country: France
- Region: Bourgogne-Franche-Comté
- Department: Saône-et-Loire
- Arrondissement: Mâcon
- Canton: La Chapelle-de-Guinchay
- Area^{1}: 18.6 km^{2} (7.2 sq mi)
- Elevation: 450 m (1,480 ft)
- Highest elevation: 755 m (2,477 ft)
- Lowest elevation: 317 m (1,040 ft)
- Population (2023): 1,070
  - Density: 57.5/km^{2} (149/sq mi)
- Time zone: UTC+01:00 (CET)
  - Summer (DST): UTC+02:00 (CEST)
- INSEE/Postal code: 71545 /71520
- ^{1} French Land Register data, which excludes lakes, ponds, glaciers > 1 km^{2} (0.386 sq mi or 247 acres) and river estuaries.

Tramayes (French pronunciation: [tʁamaj]) is a commune in the Saône-et-Loire department in the region of Bourgogne-Franche-Comté in eastern France.

== See also ==
- Communes of the Saône-et-Loire department
