= Saint-Léger-sous-la-Bussière =

- Commune
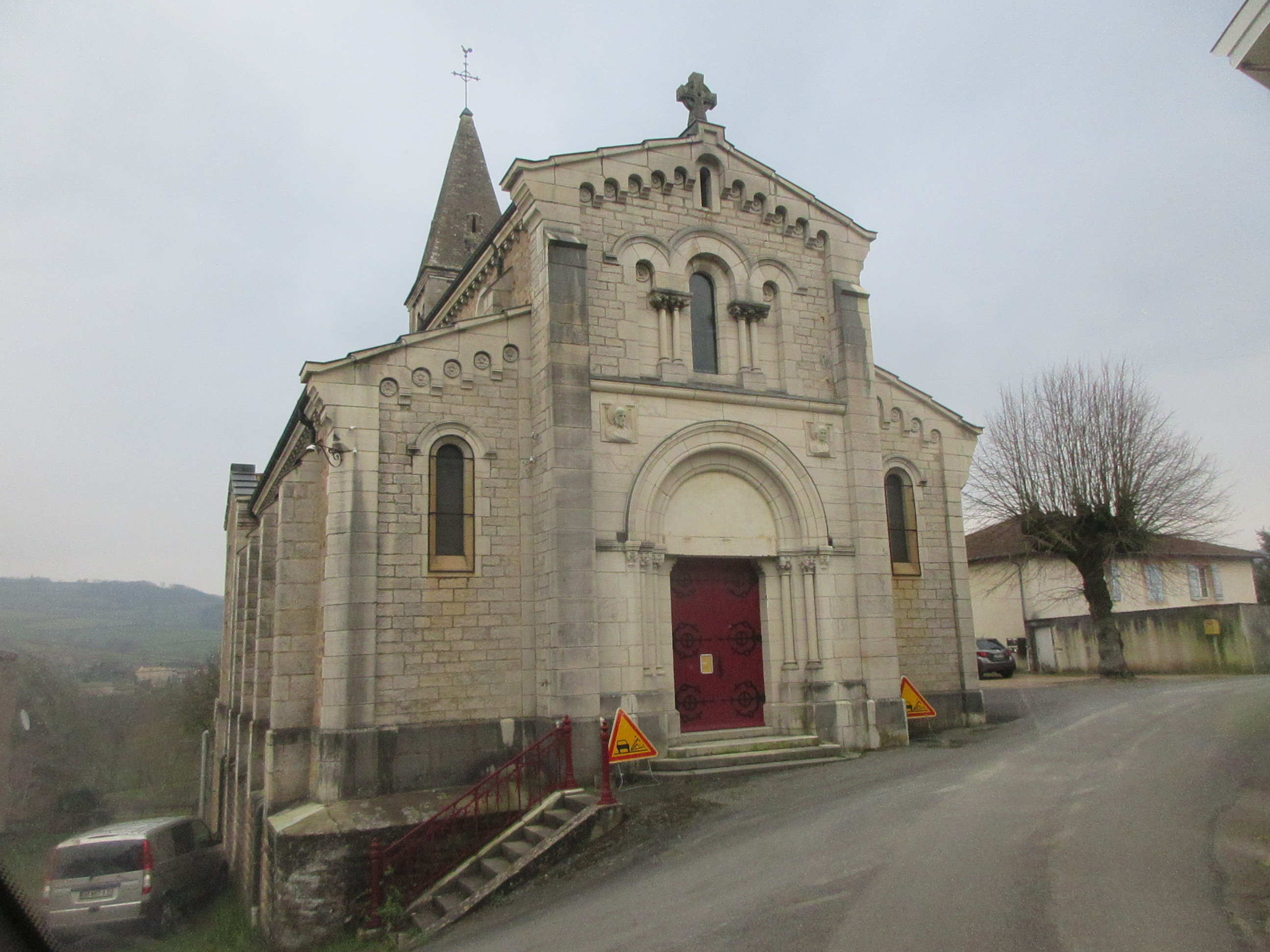
- The church in Saint-Léger-sous-la-Bussière
- Location of Saint-Léger-sous-la-Bussière
- Location within France Location within Bourgogne-Franche-Comté
- Coordinates: 46°18′41″N 4°33′18″E
- Country: France
- Region: Bourgogne-Franche-Comté
- Department: Saône-et-Loire
- Arrondissement: Mâcon
- Canton: La Chapelle-de-Guinchay
- Area^{1}: 8.64 km^{2} (3.34 sq mi)
- Elevation: 312 m (1,024 ft)
- Highest elevation: 555 m (1,821 ft)
- Lowest elevation: 290 m (950 ft)
- Population (2023): 290
  - Density: 34/km^{2} (87/sq mi)
- Time zone: UTC+01:00 (CET)
  - Summer (DST): UTC+02:00 (CEST)
- INSEE/Postal code: 71441 /71520
- ^{1} French Land Register data, which excludes lakes, ponds, glaciers > 1 km^{2} (0.386 sq mi or 247 acres) and river estuaries.

Saint-Léger-sous-la-Bussière is a commune in the Saône-et-Loire department in the region of Bourgogne-Franche-Comté in eastern France.

== Geography ==
The Grosne flows northwest through the middle of the commune.

== See also ==
- Communes of the Saône-et-Loire department
