= Saint-Pierre-le-Vieux, Saône-et-Loire =

Saint-Pierre-le-Vieux
- Commune
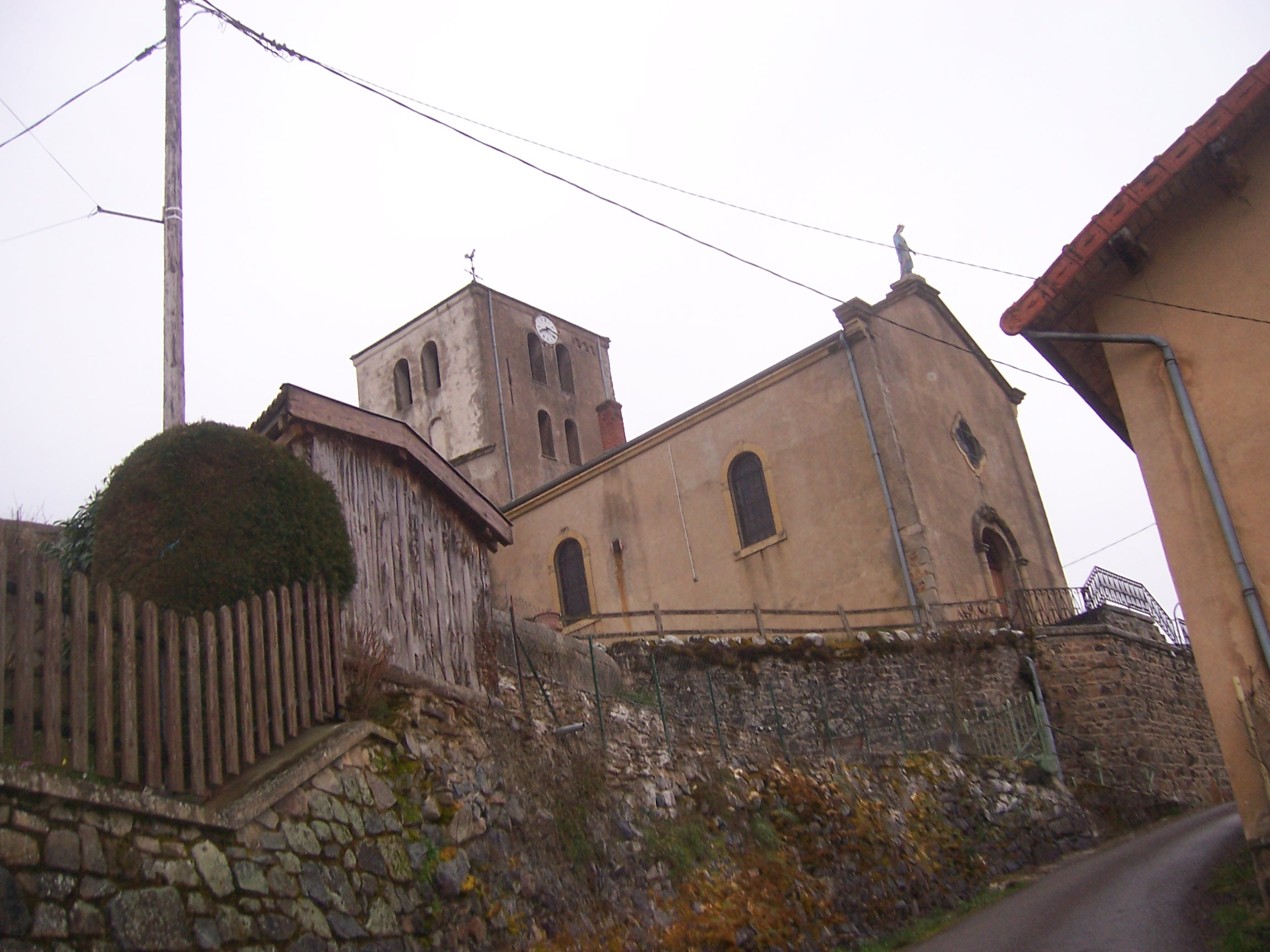
- The church in Saint-Pierre-le-Vieux
- Location of Saint-Pierre-le-Vieux
- Location within France Location within Bourgogne-Franche-Comté
- Coordinates: 46°17′10″N 4°32′13″E
- Country: France
- Region: Bourgogne-Franche-Comté
- Department: Saône-et-Loire
- Arrondissement: Mâcon
- Canton: La Chapelle-de-Guinchay

Government
  - Mayor (2024–2026): Michèle Dorin
- Area^{1}: 15.79 km^{2} (6.10 sq mi)
- Elevation: 358 m (1,175 ft)
- Highest elevation: 638 m (2,093 ft)
- Lowest elevation: 318 m (1,043 ft)
- Population (2023): 378
  - Density: 23.9/km^{2} (62.0/sq mi)
- Time zone: UTC+01:00 (CET)
  - Summer (DST): UTC+02:00 (CEST)
- INSEE/Postal code: 71469 /71520
- ^{1} French Land Register data, which excludes lakes, ponds, glaciers > 1 km^{2} (0.386 sq mi or 247 acres) and river estuaries.

Saint-Pierre-le-Vieux (French pronunciation: [sɛ̃ pjɛʁ lə vjø]) is a commune in the Saône-et-Loire department in the region of Bourgogne-Franche-Comté in eastern France.

== Geography ==
The Grosne flows northeastward through the middle of the commune and crosses the village.

== See also ==
- Communes of the Saône-et-Loire department
