= La Chapelle-du-Mont-de-France =

- Commune
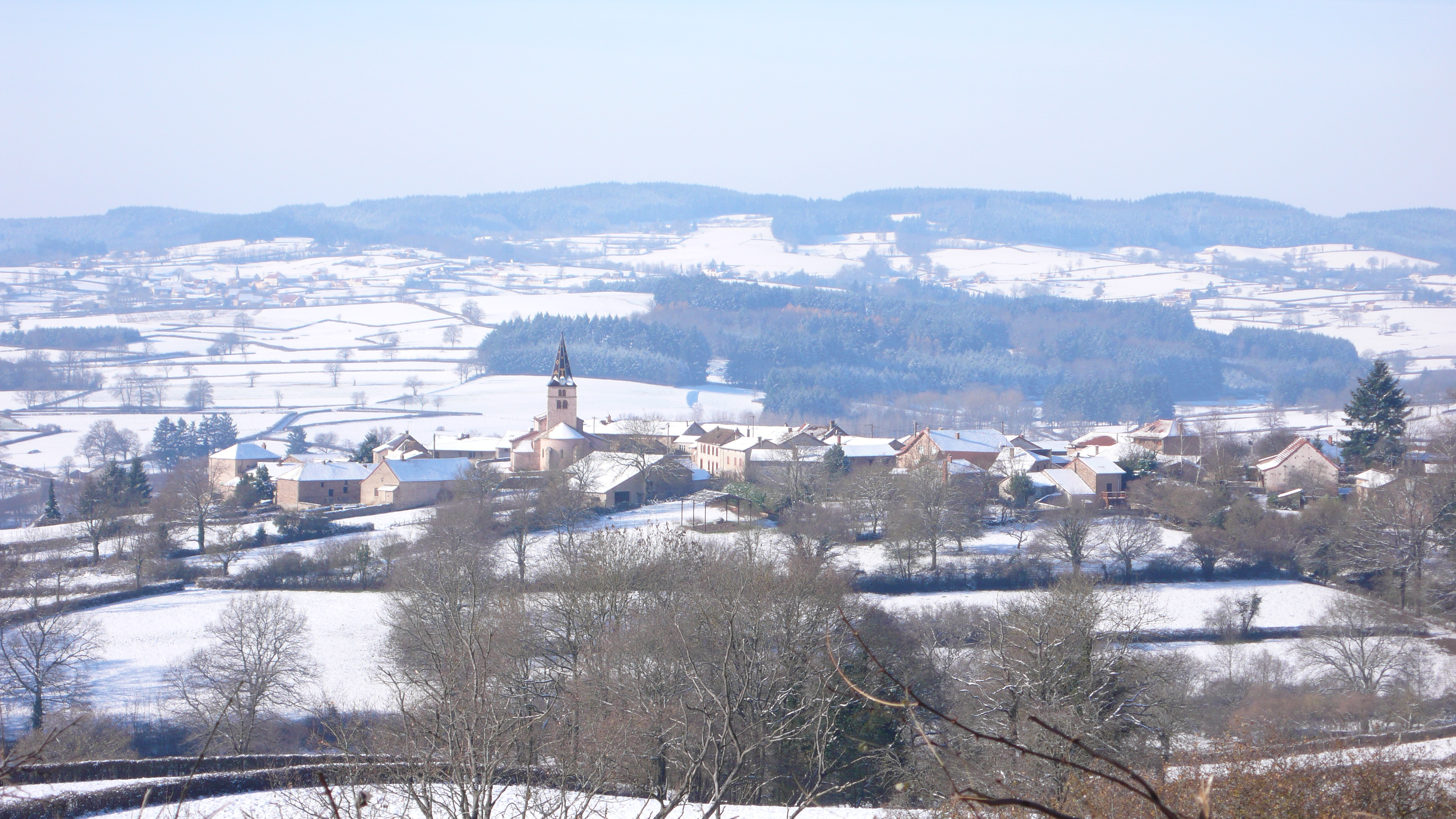
- A general view of La Chapelle-du-Mont-de-France
- Location of La Chapelle-du-Mont-de-France
- Location within France Location within Bourgogne-Franche-Comté
- Coordinates: 46°22′58″N 4°32′12″E
- Country: France
- Region: Bourgogne-Franche-Comté
- Department: Saône-et-Loire
- Arrondissement: Mâcon
- Canton: La Chapelle-de-Guinchay
- Intercommunality: Saint-Cyr Mère Boitier entre Charolais et Mâconnais

Government
  - Mayor (2020–2026): Philippe Hilarion
- Area^{1}: 9.11 km^{2} (3.52 sq mi)
- Elevation: 314 m (1,030 ft)
- Highest elevation: 546 m (1,791 ft)
- Lowest elevation: 294 m (965 ft)
- Population (2023): 189
  - Density: 20.7/km^{2} (53.7/sq mi)
- Time zone: UTC+01:00 (CET)
  - Summer (DST): UTC+02:00 (CEST)
- INSEE/Postal code: 71091 /71520
- ^{1} French Land Register data, which excludes lakes, ponds, glaciers > 1 km^{2} (0.386 sq mi or 247 acres) and river estuaries.

La Chapelle-du-Mont-de-France is a commune in the Saône-et-Loire department in the region of Bourgogne-Franche-Comté in eastern France.

== See also ==
- Communes of the Saône-et-Loire department
