= Dompierre-les-Ormes =

- Commune
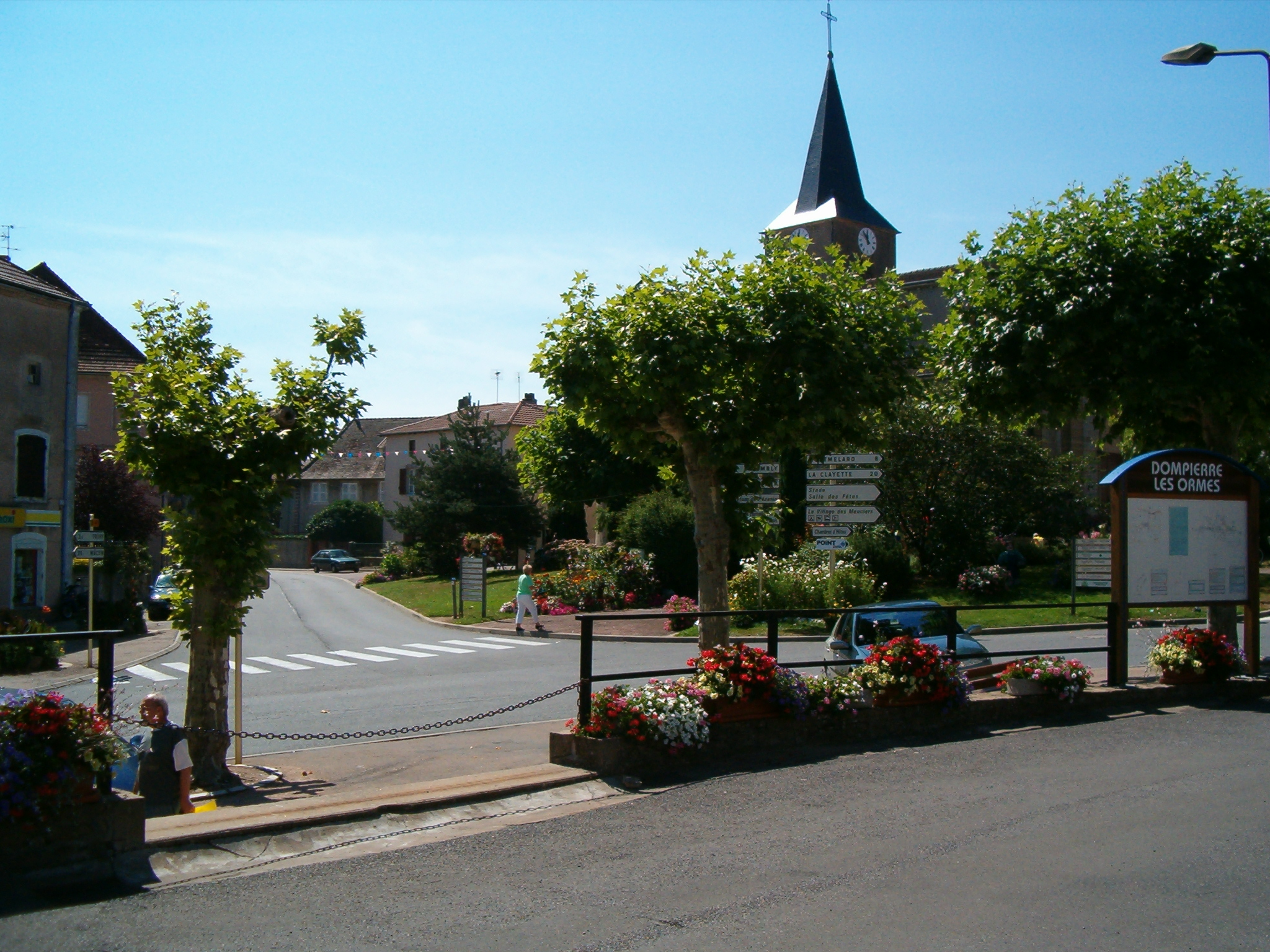
- The church and surroundings in Dompierre-les-Ormes
- Location of Dompierre-les-Ormes
- Location within France Location within Bourgogne-Franche-Comté
- Coordinates: 46°21′43″N 4°28′57″E
- Country: France
- Region: Bourgogne-Franche-Comté
- Department: Saône-et-Loire
- Arrondissement: Mâcon
- Canton: La Chapelle-de-Guinchay
- Intercommunality: Saint-Cyr Mère Boitier, entre Mâconnais et Charolais

Government
  - Mayor (2020–2026): Géraldine Auray
- Area^{1}: 30.23 km^{2} (11.67 sq mi)
- Elevation: 457 m (1,499 ft)
- Highest elevation: 705 m (2,313 ft)
- Lowest elevation: 316 m (1,037 ft)
- Population (2023): 893
  - Density: 29.5/km^{2} (76.5/sq mi)
- Time zone: UTC+01:00 (CET)
  - Summer (DST): UTC+02:00 (CEST)
- INSEE/Postal code: 71178 /71520
- ^{1} French Land Register data, which excludes lakes, ponds, glaciers > 1 km^{2} (0.386 sq mi or 247 acres) and river estuaries.

Dompierre-les-Ormes (French pronunciation: [dɔ̃pjɛʁ le.z‿ɔʁm]) is a commune in the department of Saône-et-Loire in Bourgogne-Franche-Comté, France.

It is a rural and touristic village, with characteristic landscapes: little mountains crowded with forests and pastures. The main part of its territory is protected under French and European fauna and flora protection programs.

== History ==
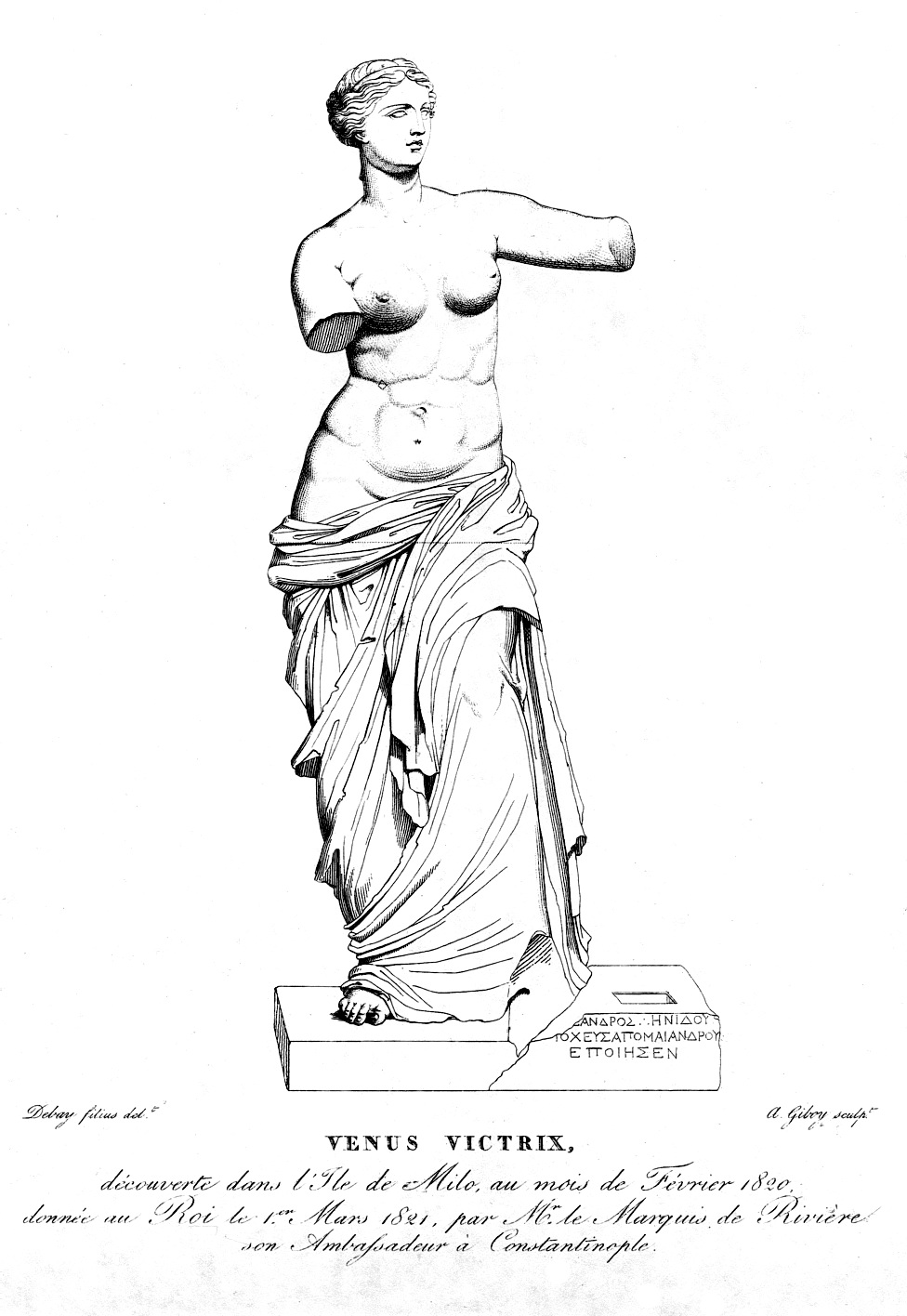
Venus de Milo

Dompierre is first mentioned in a Cluny charter from 951, where the name appears as Domnus Petrus and Domna Petra.

In 1820, the Comte de Marcellus brings the very famous Venus de Milo in France. During his journey, the precious statue made a halt at the castle Audour before being offered to King Louis XVIII.

The poet Alphonse de Lamartine stayed on occasion in the Château d'Audour in Dompierre, writing of it in 1862, "It's a Mary Stuart chateau in a Scottish landscape."

Since 1993 Dompierre has been a member of the Association des Dompierre de France, an association of 23 French communes sharing the name.

== Geography ==
Nestled in a picturesque wooded area, Dompierre is known locally as la petite Suisse du Mâconnais (Little Switzerland in the Mâconnais).

== Points of interest ==
- Arboretum de Pézanin,
- La Galerie européenne de la forêt et du bois (European Gallery of Forest and Wood), with many exhibits, transformed in 2014 in The Lab 71, which is now more concerned by sustainable development.
- Mont Saint-Cyr, a 771-meter summit in the nearby village of Montmelard
- Château d'Audour
- Meulin, an ancient village with a Romanesque church

== Tourism ==
Dompierre is a tourist destination, with campsite (Le Village des Meuniers), cottage colonies (Domaine des Monts du Mâconnais), and lot of rural gîtes and bed and breakfast in the area.

== Sport ==
The village has a football stadium which serves for matches and training of FCDM (Football Club Dompierre-Matour), a handball and basketball stadium, pétanque courts, tennis courts and many walking trails. Walking trails are referenced by guides and maps for tourists. For water activities, there are two pools (Le Village des Meuniers campground and the Domaine des Monts du Mâconnais have each a pool).

== Transport and access ==
Dompierre is located in Bourgogne-Franche-Comté, about 200 mi (320 km) southeast of Paris and 17 mi (27 km) west of Mâcon, where there is a TGV (high-speed rail) station and A6 turnpike access.

Due to its central location in France, the village takes full advantages of close infrastructures as the Route Centre-Europe Atlantique (east-west connexion road from Atlantic Ocean to Switzerland border), passing through the north of the territory. Dompierre is served by the road exit number 8 "Dompierre-les-Ormes".

== Gallery ==
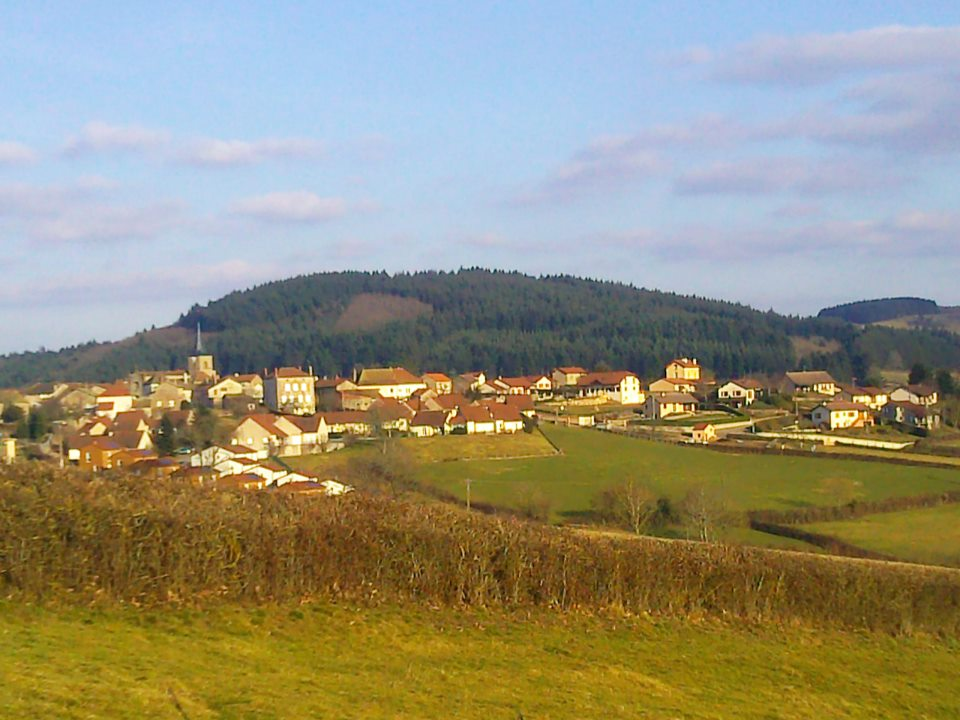
A winter evening

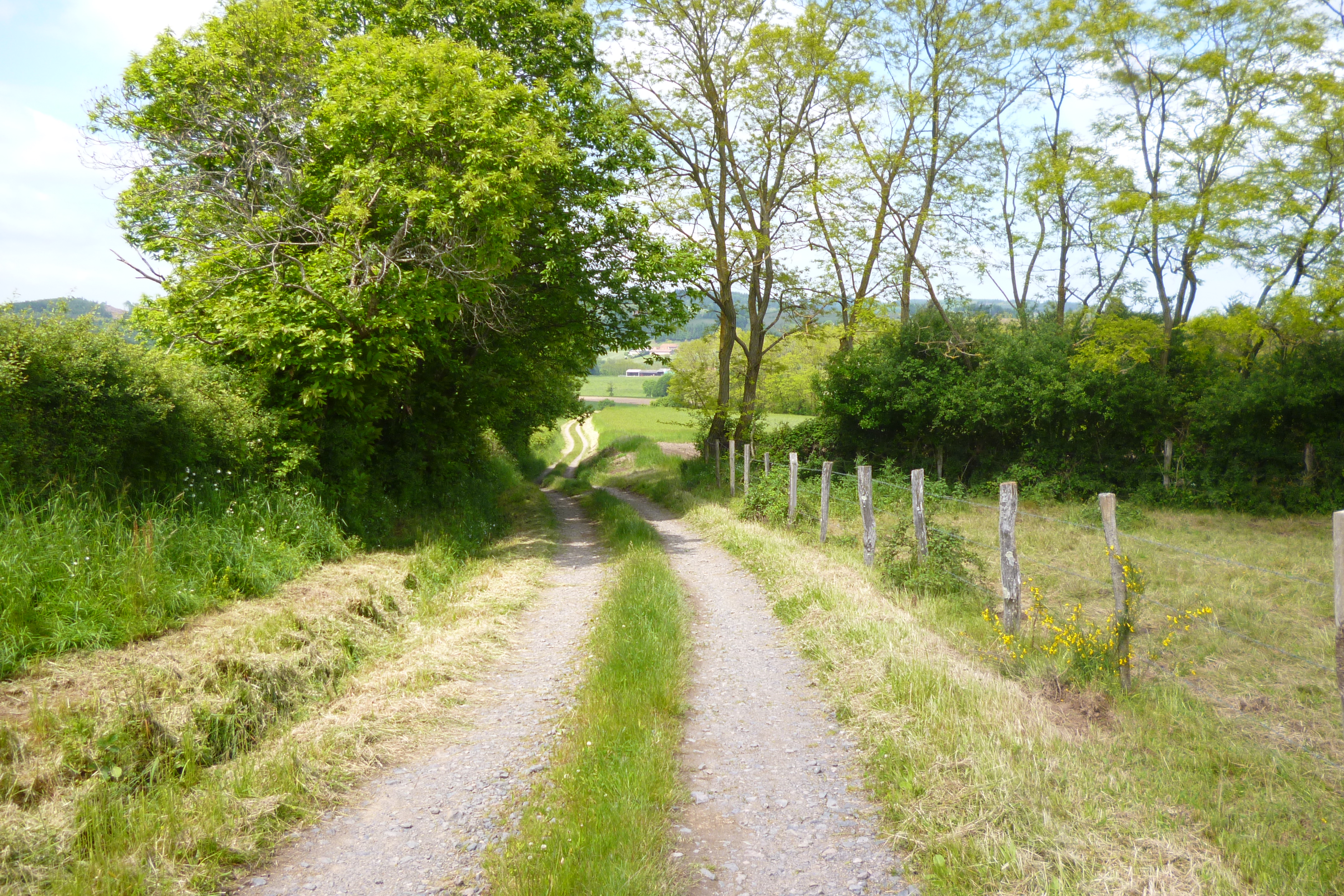
Chemin de la Vernée
(a country lane north of the village)

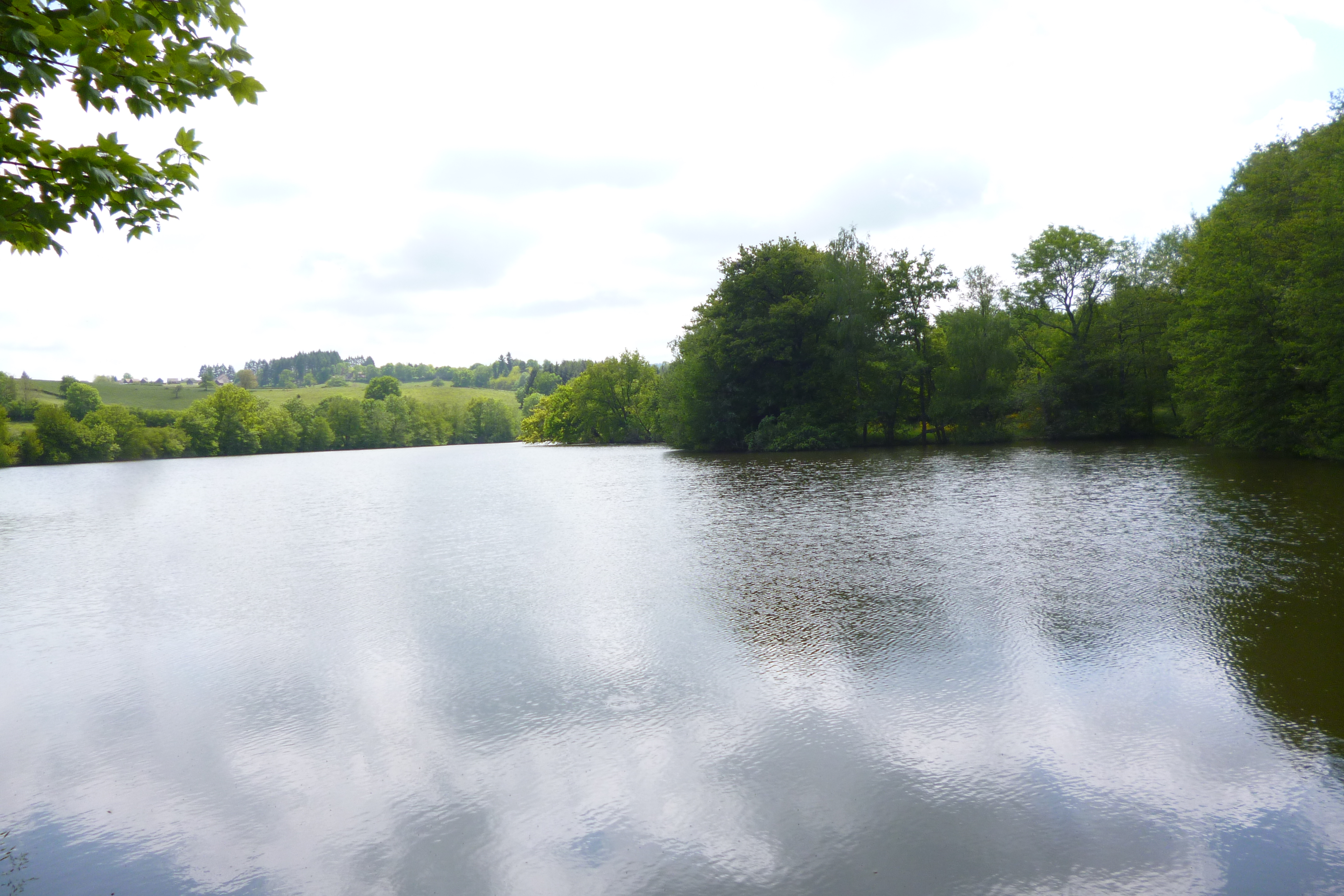
La Vernée Lake

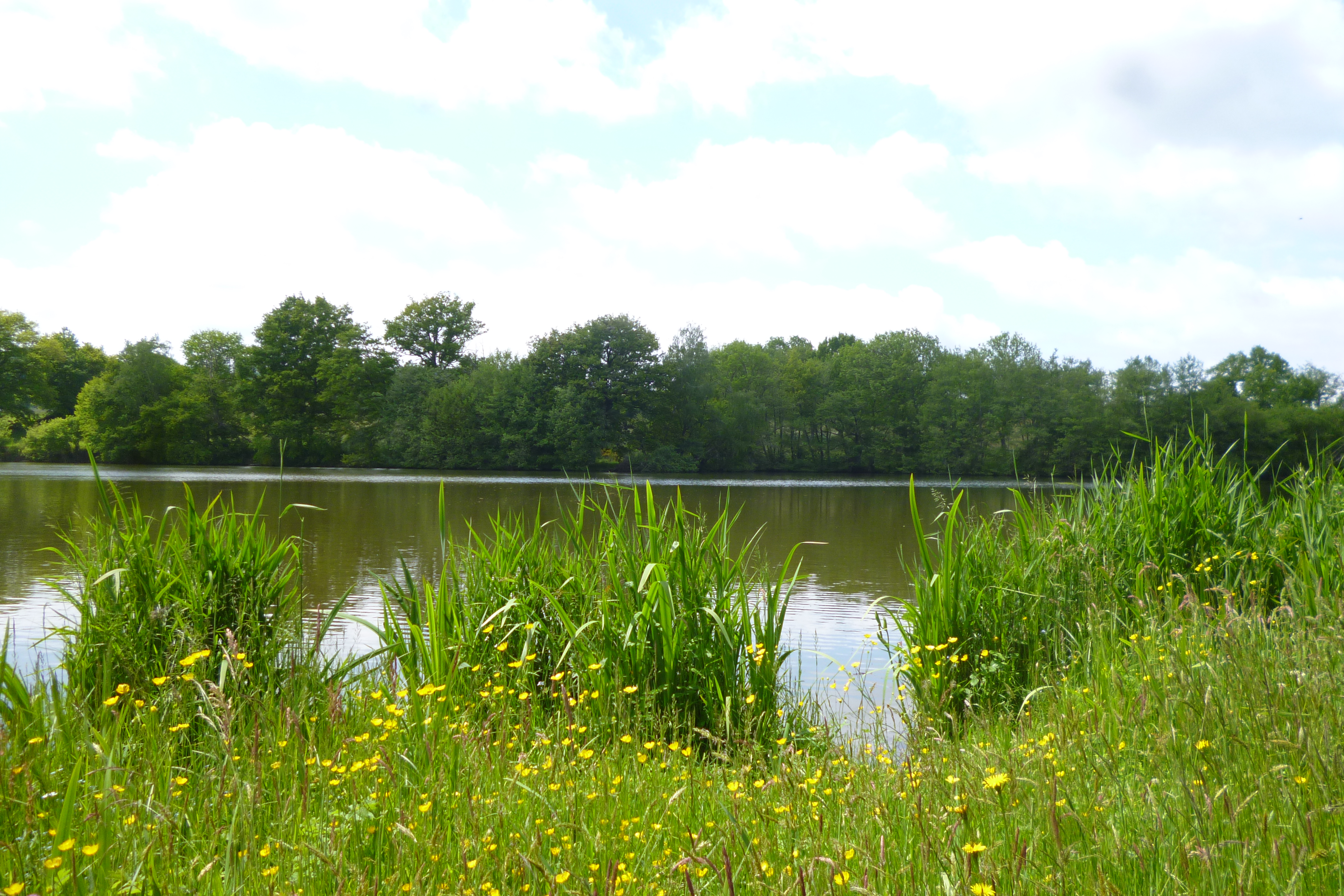
View of La Vernée Lake

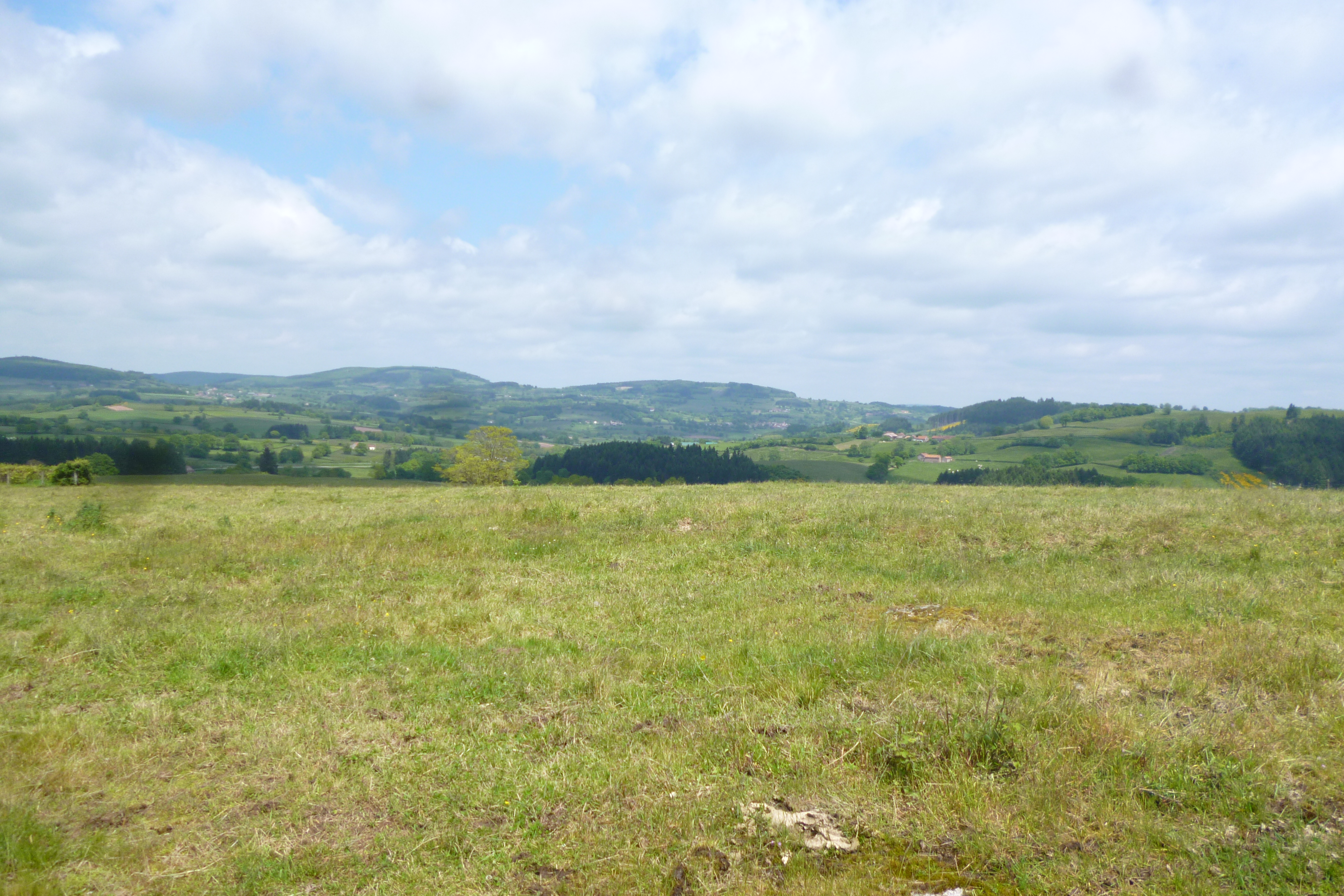
View of surrounding hills

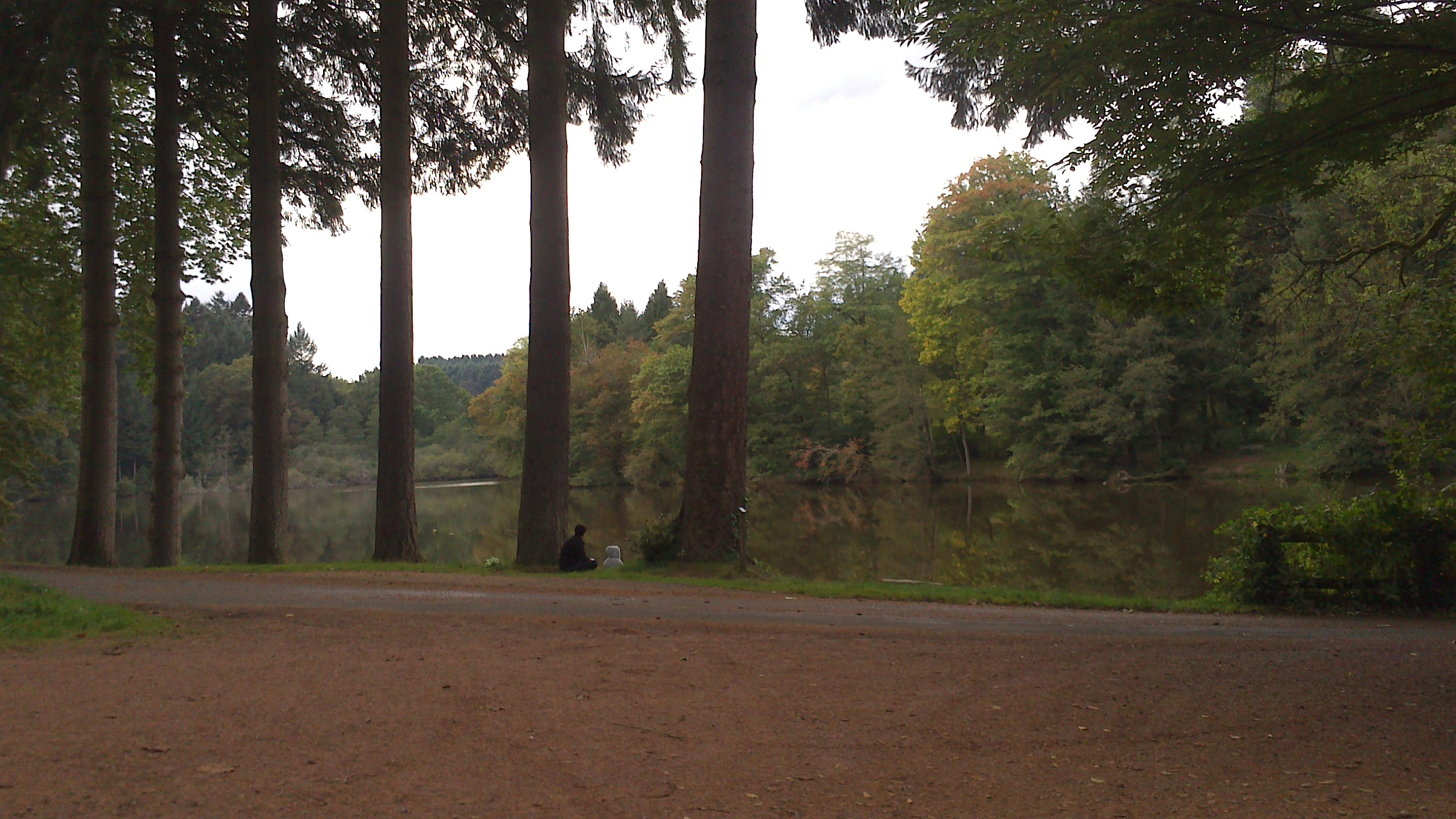
Arboretum de Pézanin in autumn

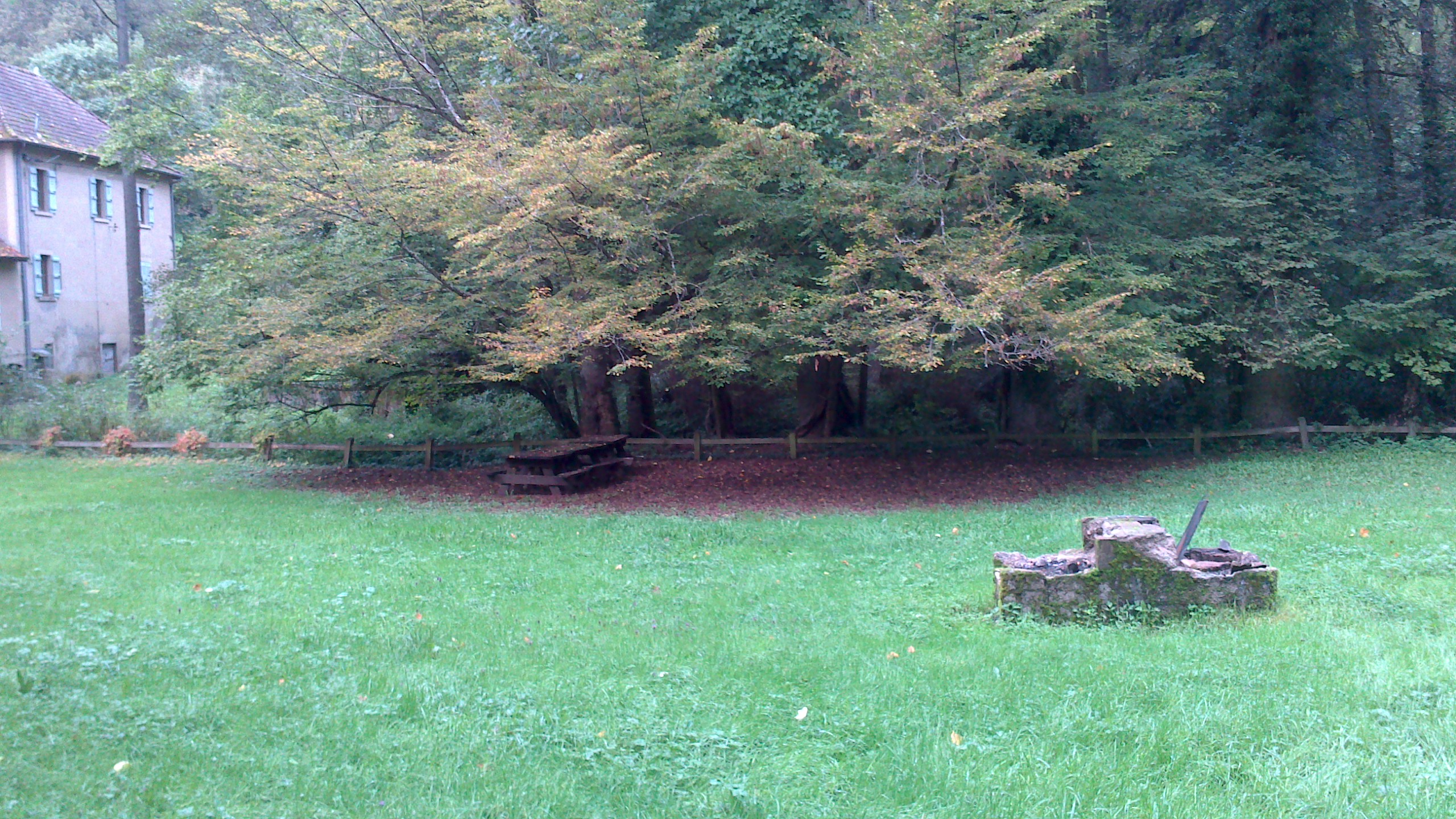
Picnic area of Pézanin

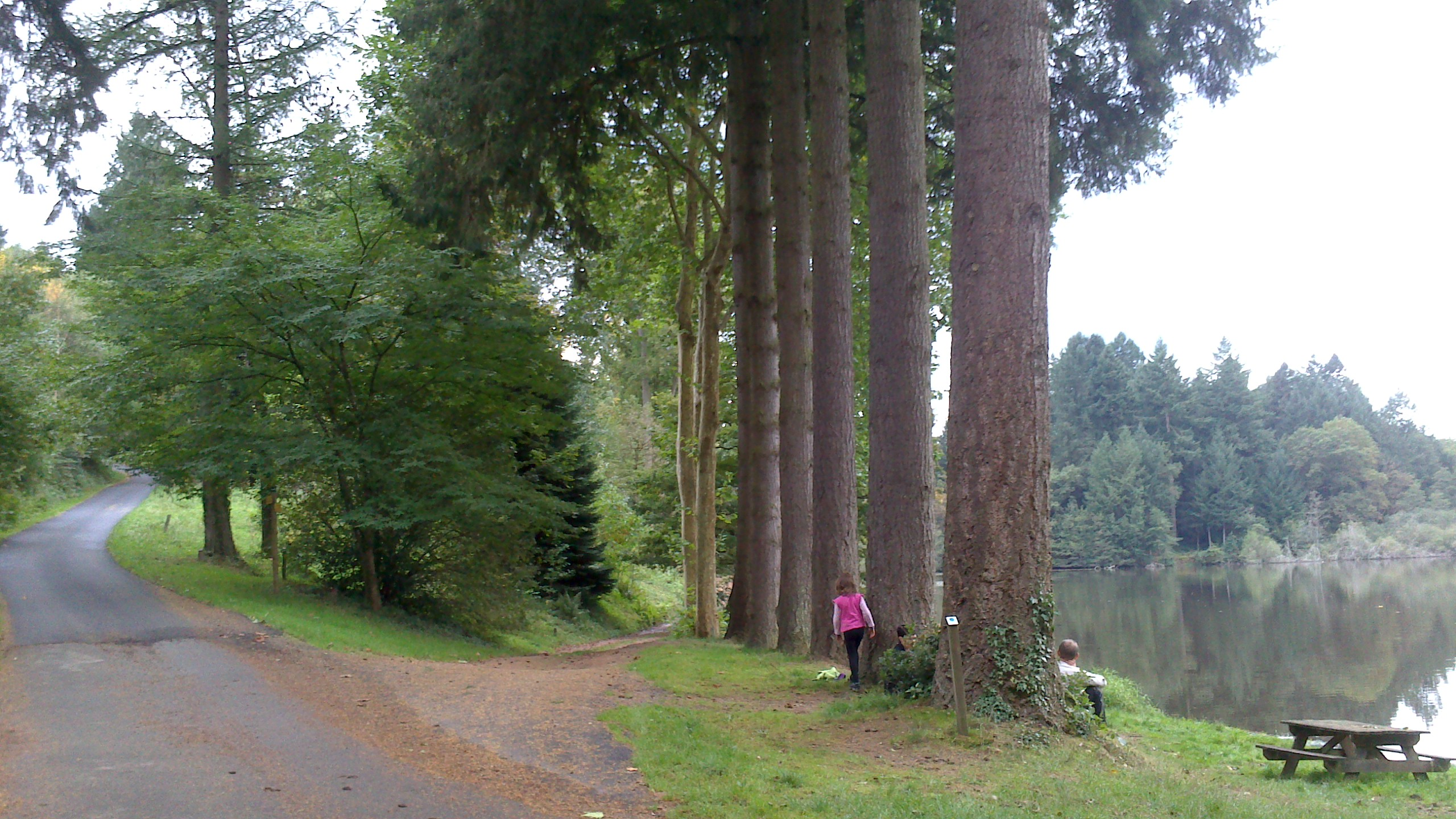
Arboretum de Pézanin

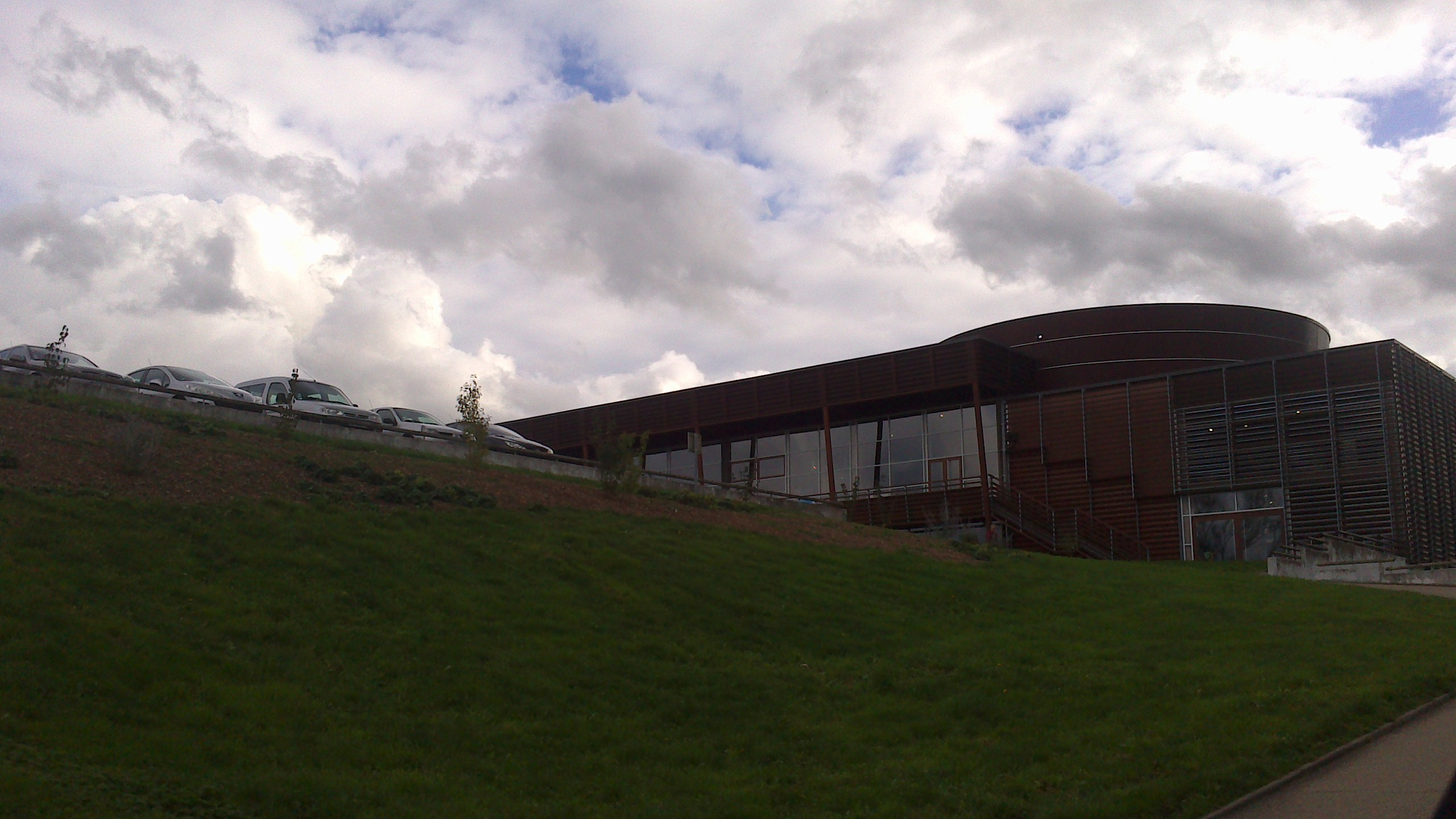
The Lab71

== See also ==
- Communes of the Saône-et-Loire department
- Arboretum de Pézanin
