= Saint-Symphorien-d'Ancelles =

- Commune
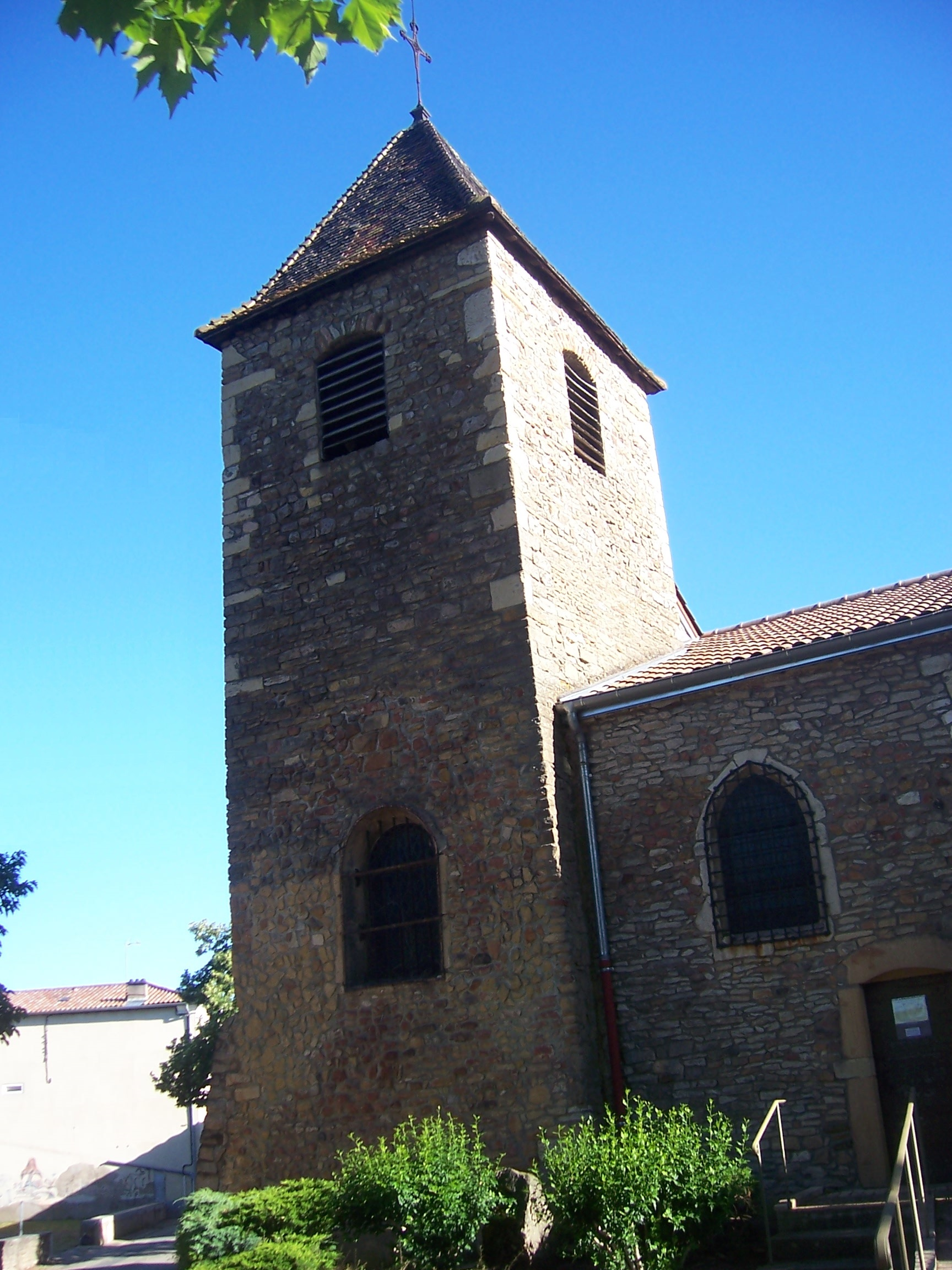
- The church in Saint-Symphorien-d'Ancelles

- Coat of arms
- Location of Saint-Symphorien-d'Ancelles
- Location within France Location within Bourgogne-Franche-Comté
- Coordinates: 46°11′56″N 4°46′15″E
- Country: France
- Region: Bourgogne-Franche-Comté
- Department: Saône-et-Loire
- Arrondissement: Mâcon
- Canton: La Chapelle-de-Guinchay
- Intercommunality: Mâconnais Beaujolais Agglomération
- Area^{1}: 6.13 km^{2} (2.37 sq mi)
- Elevation: 179 m (587 ft)
- Highest elevation: 198 m (650 ft)
- Lowest elevation: 168 m (551 ft)
- Population (2023): 1,131
  - Density: 185/km^{2} (478/sq mi)
- Time zone: UTC+01:00 (CET)
  - Summer (DST): UTC+02:00 (CEST)
- INSEE/Postal code: 71481 /71570
- ^{1} French Land Register data, which excludes lakes, ponds, glaciers > 1 km^{2} (0.386 sq mi or 247 acres) and river estuaries.

Saint-Symphorien-d'Ancelles is a commune in the Saône-et-Loire department in the region of Bourgogne-Franche-Comté in eastern France.

== See also ==
- Communes of the Saône-et-Loire department
