= La Chapelle-de-Guinchay =

- Commune
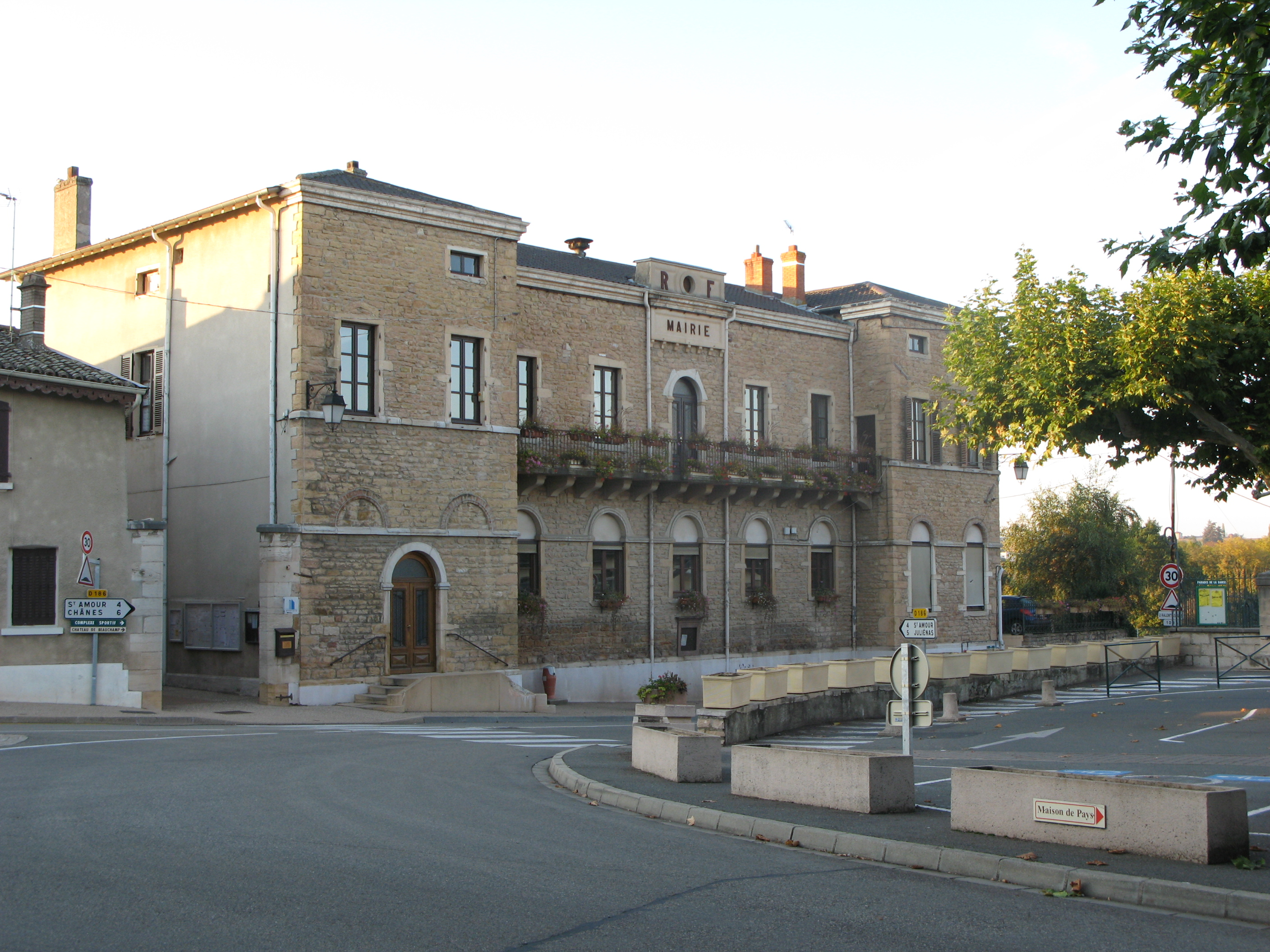
- The town hall in La Chapelle-de-Guinchay
- Location of La Chapelle-de-Guinchay
- Location within France Location within Bourgogne-Franche-Comté
- Coordinates: 46°12′41″N 4°45′19″E
- Country: France
- Region: Bourgogne-Franche-Comté
- Department: Saône-et-Loire
- Arrondissement: Mâcon
- Canton: La Chapelle-de-Guinchay
- Intercommunality: Mâconnais Beaujolais Agglomération

Government
  - Mayor (2020–2026): Herve Carreau
- Area^{1}: 12.44 km^{2} (4.80 sq mi)
- Elevation: 191 m (627 ft)
- Highest elevation: 295 m (968 ft)
- Lowest elevation: 168 m (551 ft)
- Population (2023): 4,018
  - Density: 323.0/km^{2} (836.5/sq mi)
- Time zone: UTC+01:00 (CET)
  - Summer (DST): UTC+02:00 (CEST)
- INSEE/Postal code: 71090 /71570
- ^{1} French Land Register data, which excludes lakes, ponds, glaciers > 1 km^{2} (0.386 sq mi or 247 acres) and river estuaries.

La Chapelle-de-Guinchay (French pronunciation: [la ʃapɛl də ɡɛ̃ʃɛ]) is a commune in the Saône-et-Loire department in the region of Bourgogne-Franche-Comté in eastern France.

== Population ==
Historical population
Year	Pop.	±% p.a.
1968	2,009	—
1975	2,135	+0.87%
1982	2,213	+0.51%
1990	2,233	+0.11%
1999	2,595	+1.68%
2007	3,446	+3.61%
2012	3,879	+2.40%
2017	4,121	+1.22%
2023	4,018	−0.42%
Source: INSEE

== See also ==
- Communes of the Saône-et-Loire department
