= Canton of La Chapelle-de-Guinchay =

Coordinates: 46.21°N 4.76°E

The canton of La Chapelle-de-Guinchay is an administrative division of the Saône-et-Loire department, eastern France. Its borders were modified at the French canton reorganisation which came into effect in March 2015. Its seat is in La Chapelle-de-Guinchay.

It consists of the following communes:

1. Bourgvilain
2. Chaintré
3. Chânes
4. La Chapelle-de-Guinchay
5. La Chapelle-du-Mont-de-France
6. Chasselas
7. Crêches-sur-Saône
8. Davayé
9. Dompierre-les-Ormes
10. Fuissé
11. Germolles-sur-Grosne
12. Leynes
13. Matour
14. Montmelard
15. Navour-sur-Grosne
16. Pierreclos
17. Pruzilly
18. Romanèche-Thorins
19. Saint-Amour-Bellevue
20. Saint-Léger-sous-la-Bussière
21. Saint-Pierre-le-Vieux
22. Saint-Point
23. Saint-Symphorien-d'Ancelles
24. Saint-Vérand
25. Serrières
26. Solutré-Pouilly
27. Tramayes
28. Trambly
29. Trivy
30. Vergisson
31. Verosvres
32. Vinzelles
