= Chasselas, Saône-et-Loire =

Chasselas
- Commune
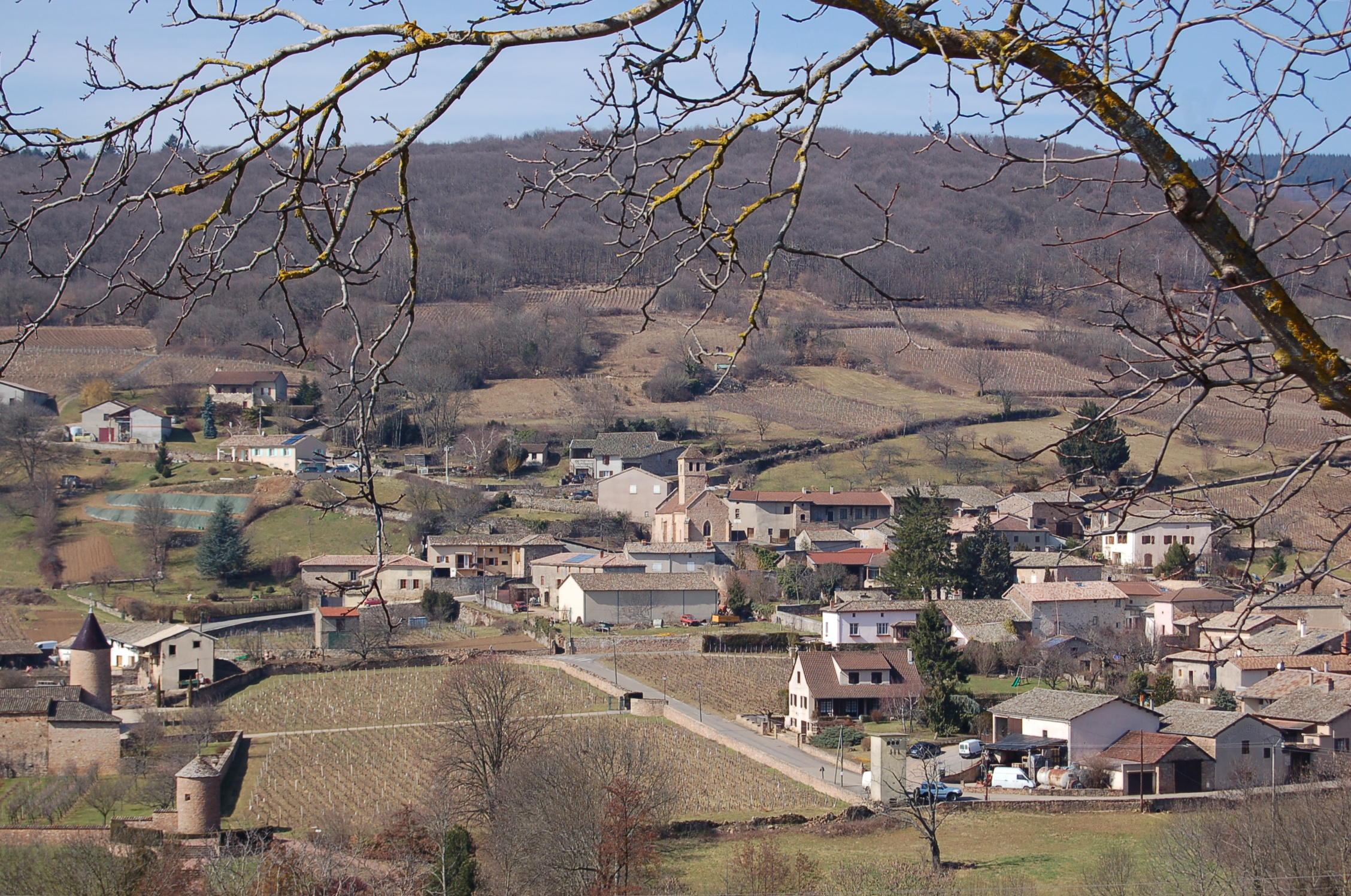
- A general view of Chasselas

- Coat of arms
- Location of Chasselas
- Location within France Location within Bourgogne-Franche-Comté
- Coordinates: 46°16′37″N 4°43′13″E
- Country: France
- Region: Bourgogne-Franche-Comté
- Department: Saône-et-Loire
- Arrondissement: Mâcon
- Canton: La Chapelle-de-Guinchay
- Intercommunality: Mâconnais Beaujolais Agglomération

Government
  - Mayor (2023–2026): Claire Pelletier
- Area^{1}: 2.56 km^{2} (0.99 sq mi)
- Elevation: 300 m (980 ft)
- Highest elevation: 485 m (1,591 ft)
- Lowest elevation: 286 m (938 ft)
- Population (2023): 175
  - Density: 68.4/km^{2} (177/sq mi)
- Time zone: UTC+01:00 (CET)
  - Summer (DST): UTC+02:00 (CEST)
- INSEE/Postal code: 71108 /71570
- ^{1} French Land Register data, which excludes lakes, ponds, glaciers > 1 km^{2} (0.386 sq mi or 247 acres) and river estuaries.

Chasselas is a commune in the Saône-et-Loire department in the region of Bourgogne-Franche-Comté in eastern France. It has given its name to the white wine grape chasselas.

== See also ==
- Communes of the Saône-et-Loire department
