= Trivy =

- Commune
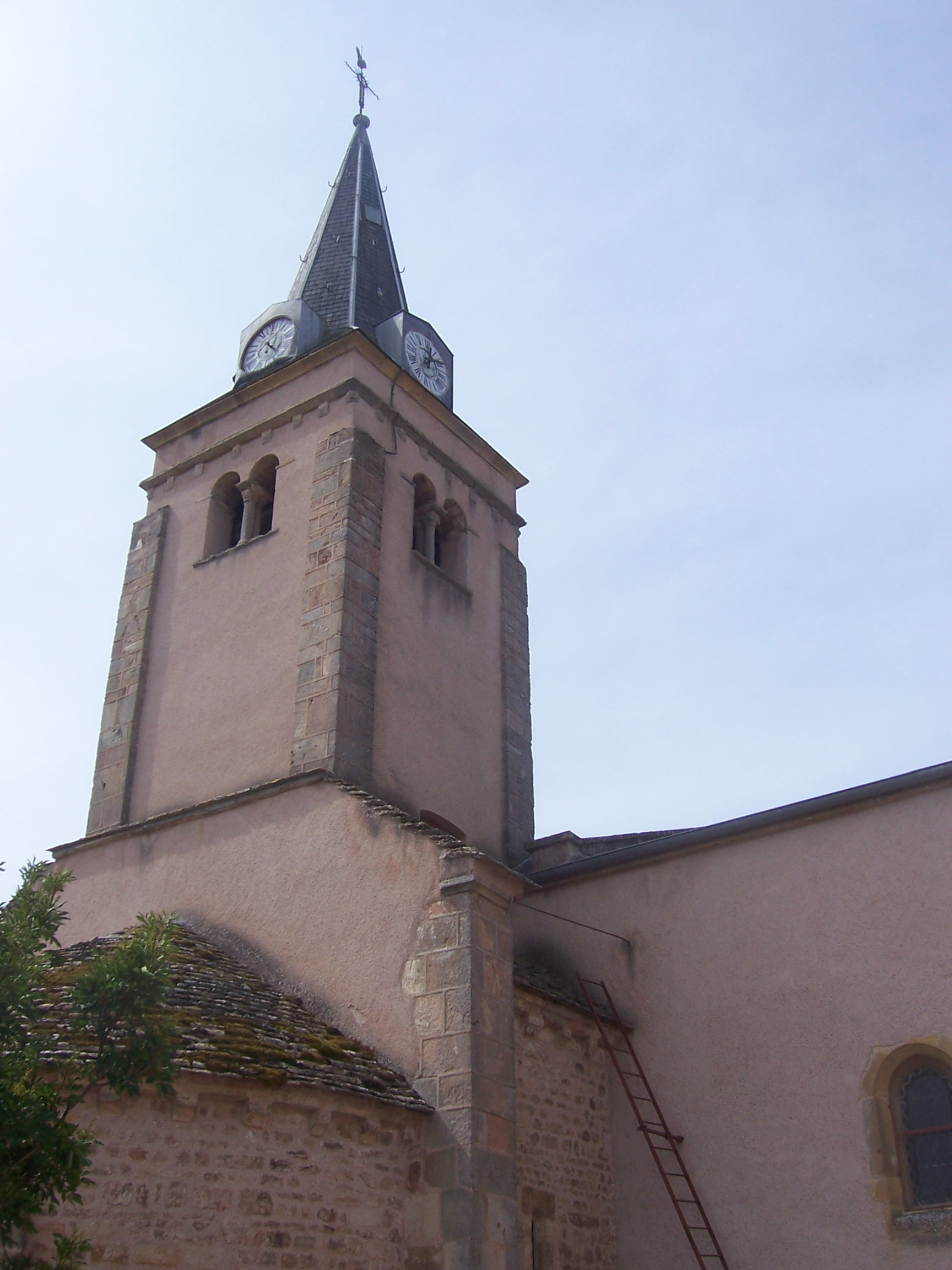
- The church in Trivy
- Location of Trivy
- Location within France Location within Bourgogne-Franche-Comté
- Coordinates: 46°23′14″N 4°29′34″E
- Country: France
- Region: Bourgogne-Franche-Comté
- Department: Saône-et-Loire
- Arrondissement: Mâcon
- Canton: La Chapelle-de-Guinchay
- Area^{1}: 11.64 km^{2} (4.49 sq mi)
- Elevation: 375 m (1,230 ft)
- Highest elevation: 511 m (1,677 ft)
- Lowest elevation: 318 m (1,043 ft)
- Population (2023): 261
  - Density: 22.4/km^{2} (58.1/sq mi)
- Time zone: UTC+01:00 (CET)
  - Summer (DST): UTC+02:00 (CEST)
- INSEE/Postal code: 71547 /71520
- ^{1} French Land Register data, which excludes lakes, ponds, glaciers > 1 km^{2} (0.386 sq mi or 247 acres) and river estuaries.

Trivy (French pronunciation: [tʁivi]) is a commune in the Saône-et-Loire department in the region of Bourgogne-Franche-Comté in eastern France.

== See also ==
- Communes of the Saône-et-Loire department
