= Saint-Point =

- Commune
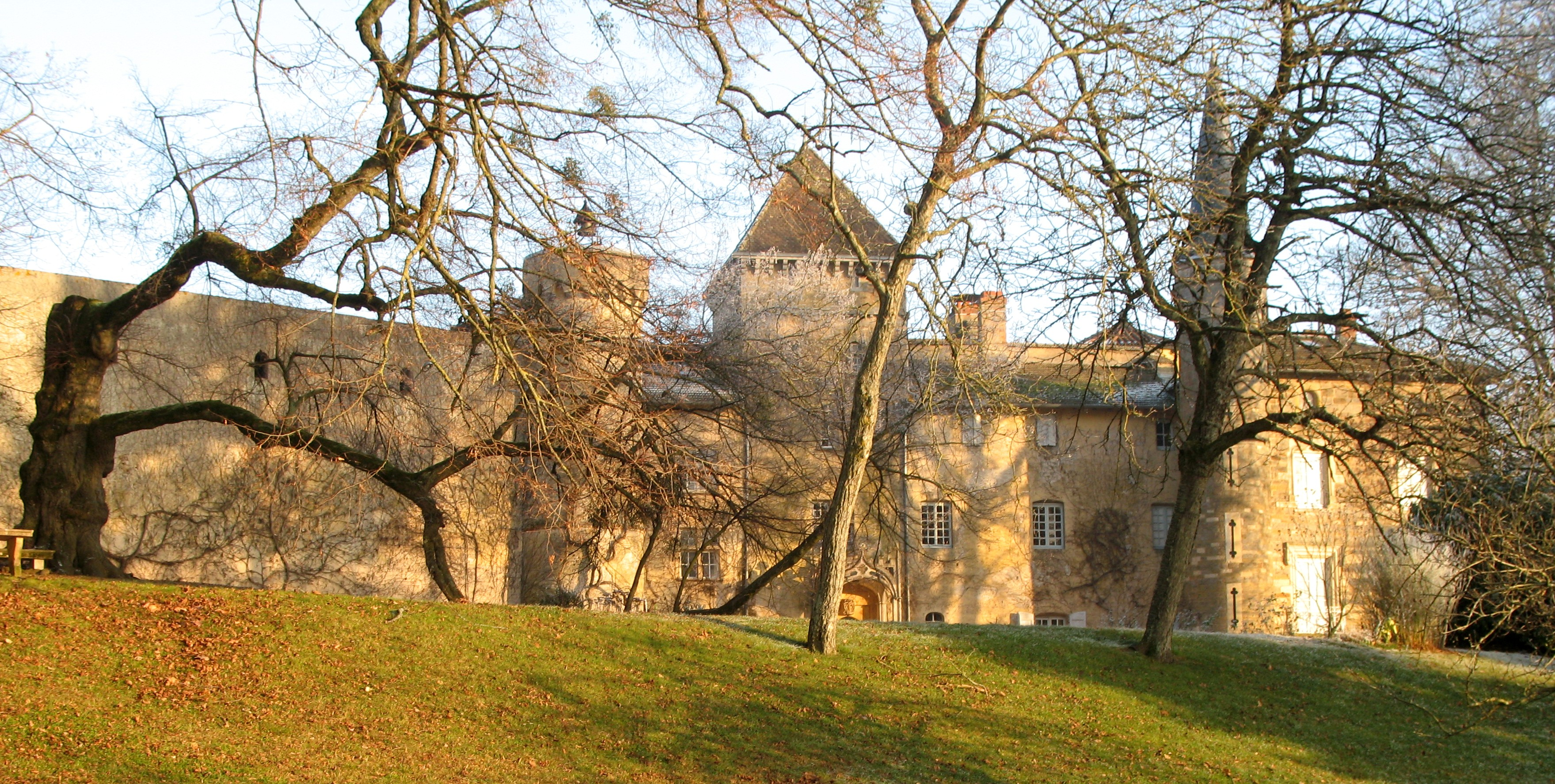
- Chateau
- Location of Saint-Point
- Location within France Location within Bourgogne-Franche-Comté
- Coordinates: 46°20′27″N 4°37′03″E
- Country: France
- Region: Bourgogne-Franche-Comté
- Department: Saône-et-Loire
- Arrondissement: Mâcon
- Canton: La Chapelle-de-Guinchay

Government
  - Mayor (2022–2026): Pierre-Yves Quelin
- Area^{1}: 14.24 km^{2} (5.50 sq mi)
- Elevation: 330 m (1,080 ft)
- Highest elevation: 746 m (2,448 ft)
- Lowest elevation: 296 m (971 ft)
- Population (2023): 363
  - Density: 25.5/km^{2} (66.0/sq mi)
- Time zone: UTC+01:00 (CET)
  - Summer (DST): UTC+02:00 (CEST)
- INSEE/Postal code: 71470 /71520
- ^{1} French Land Register data, which excludes lakes, ponds, glaciers > 1 km^{2} (0.386 sq mi or 247 acres) and river estuaries.

Saint-Point (French pronunciation: [sɛ̃ pwɛ̃]) is a commune in the Saône-et-Loire department in the region of Bourgogne-Franche-Comté in eastern France.

== See also ==
- Communes of the Saône-et-Loire department
