= Bourgvilain =

- Commune
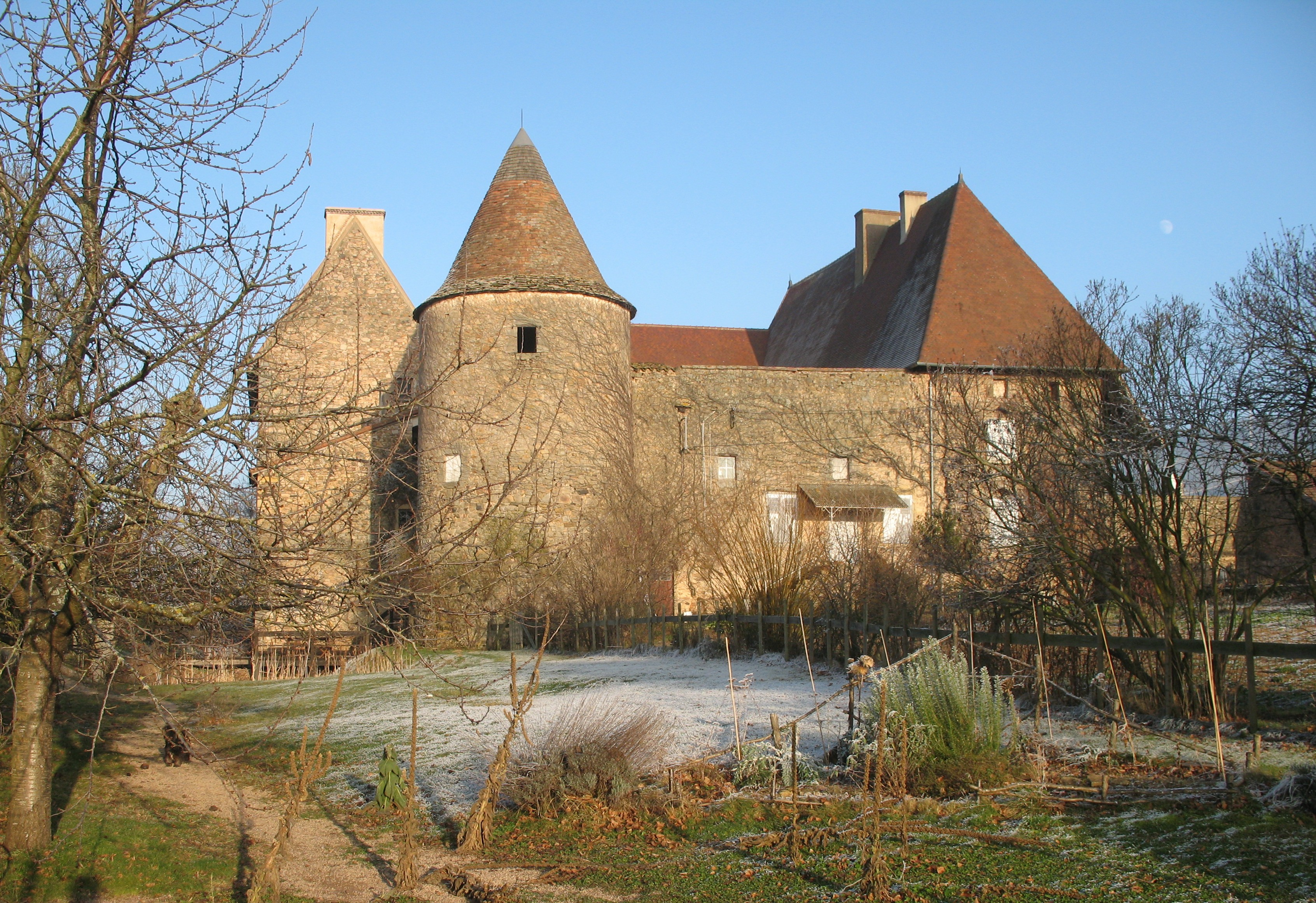
- Chateau of Corcelle
- Location of Bourgvilain
- Location within France Location within Bourgogne-Franche-Comté
- Coordinates: 46°22′14″N 4°37′56″E
- Country: France
- Region: Bourgogne-Franche-Comté
- Department: Saône-et-Loire
- Arrondissement: Mâcon
- Canton: La Chapelle-de-Guinchay
- Intercommunality: Saint-Cyr Mère Boitier entre Charolais et Mâconnais
- Area^{1}: 11.81 km^{2} (4.56 sq mi)
- Elevation: 300 m (980 ft)
- Highest elevation: 681 m (2,234 ft)
- Lowest elevation: 260 m (850 ft)
- Population (2023): 344
  - Density: 29.1/km^{2} (75.4/sq mi)
- Time zone: UTC+01:00 (CET)
  - Summer (DST): UTC+02:00 (CEST)
- INSEE/Postal code: 71050 /71520
- ^{1} French Land Register data, which excludes lakes, ponds, glaciers > 1 km^{2} (0.386 sq mi or 247 acres) and river estuaries.

Bourgvilain (French pronunciation: [buʁvilɛ̃]) is a commune in the Saône-et-Loire department in the region of Bourgogne-Franche-Comté in eastern France.

== See also ==
- Communes of the Saône-et-Loire department
