= Montmelard =

- Commune
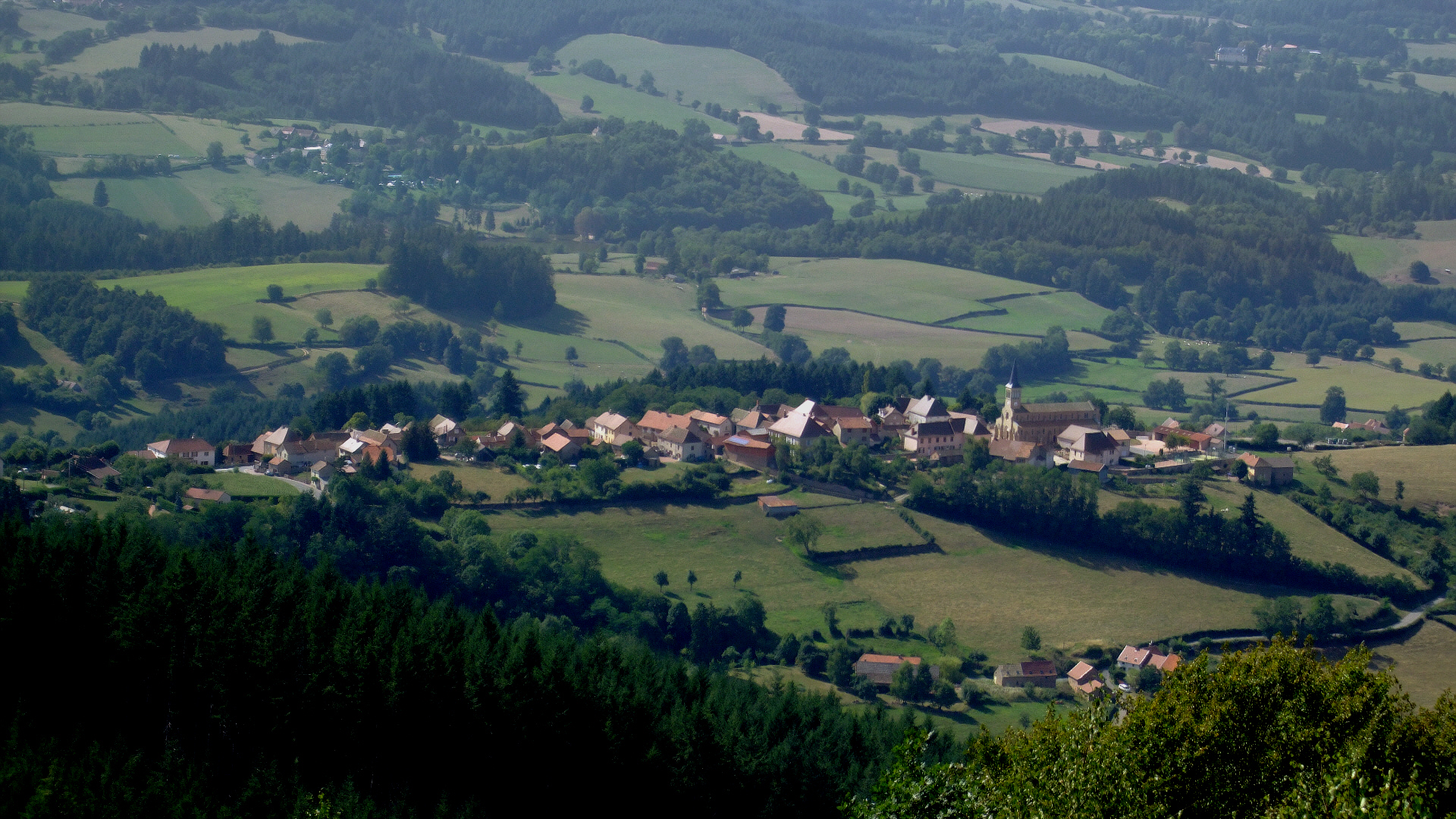
- A general view of Montmelard
- Location of Montmelard
- Location within France Location within Bourgogne-Franche-Comté
- Coordinates: 46°19′52″N 4°24′39″E
- Country: France
- Region: Bourgogne-Franche-Comté
- Department: Saône-et-Loire
- Arrondissement: Mâcon
- Canton: La Chapelle-de-Guinchay

Government
  - Mayor (2022–2026): Laure Fleury
- Area^{1}: 22.35 km^{2} (8.63 sq mi)
- Elevation: 535 m (1,755 ft)
- Highest elevation: 765 m (2,510 ft)
- Lowest elevation: 345 m (1,132 ft)
- Population (2023): 344
  - Density: 15.4/km^{2} (39.9/sq mi)
- Time zone: UTC+01:00 (CET)
  - Summer (DST): UTC+02:00 (CEST)
- INSEE/Postal code: 71316 /71520
- ^{1} French Land Register data, which excludes lakes, ponds, glaciers > 1 km^{2} (0.386 sq mi or 247 acres) and river estuaries.

Montmelard (French pronunciation: [mɔ̃məlaʁ]) is a commune in the department of Saône-et-Loire in France.

== See also ==
- Communes of the Saône-et-Loire department
