= Serrières, Saône-et-Loire =

Serrières
- Commune
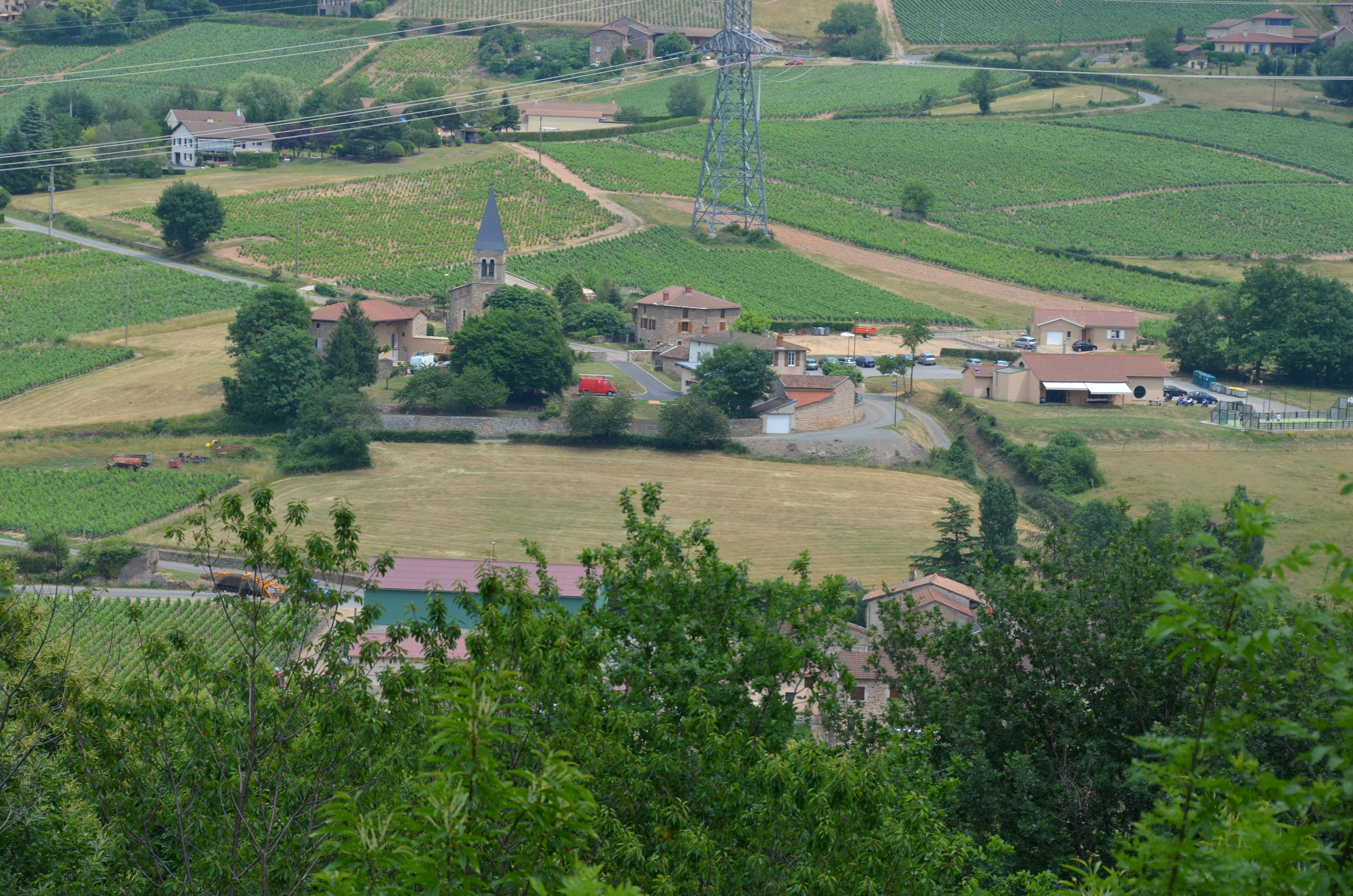
- A general view of Serrières

- Coat of arms
- Location of Serrières
- Location within France Location within Bourgogne-Franche-Comté
- Coordinates: 46°18′47″N 4°40′50″E
- Country: France
- Region: Bourgogne-Franche-Comté
- Department: Saône-et-Loire
- Arrondissement: Mâcon
- Canton: La Chapelle-de-Guinchay
- Area^{1}: 9.84 km^{2} (3.80 sq mi)
- Elevation: 410 m (1,350 ft)
- Highest elevation: 720 m (2,360 ft)
- Lowest elevation: 285 m (935 ft)
- Population (2023): 300
  - Density: 30/km^{2} (79/sq mi)
- Time zone: UTC+01:00 (CET)
  - Summer (DST): UTC+02:00 (CEST)
- INSEE/Postal code: 71518 /71960
- ^{1} French Land Register data, which excludes lakes, ponds, glaciers > 1 km^{2} (0.386 sq mi or 247 acres) and river estuaries.

Serrières (French pronunciation: [sɛʁjɛʁ]) is a commune in the Saône-et-Loire department in the region of Bourgogne-Franche-Comté in eastern France.

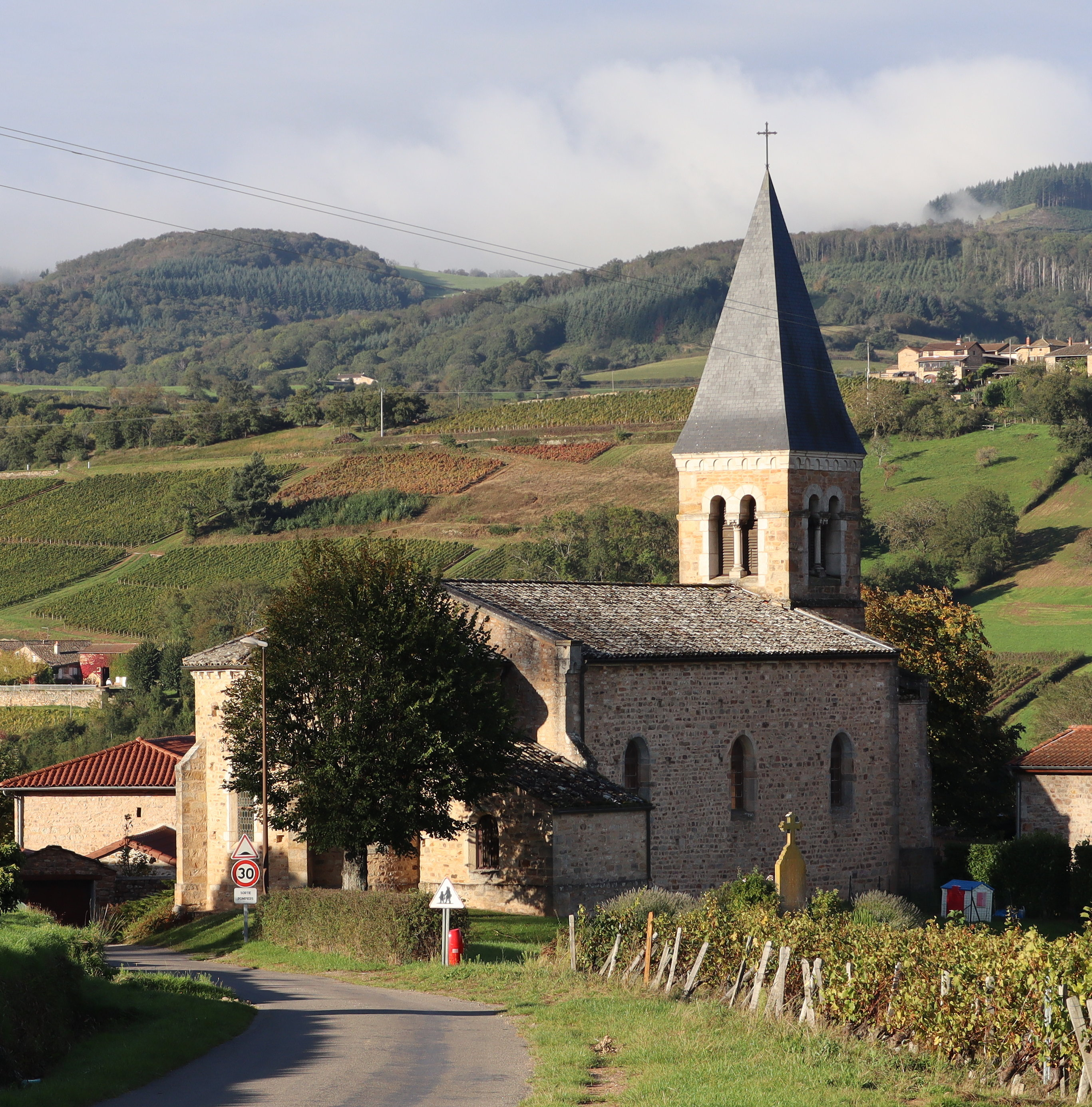
Church Saint-Jacques-le-Majeur

== See also ==
- Communes of the Saône-et-Loire department
