= Canton of Saint-Gengoux-le-National =

Coordinates: 46°33′37″N 4°38′35″E

Saint-Gengoux-le-National
- Former canton
- Interactive map of Saint-Gengoux-le-National
- Country: France
- Region: Bourgogne-Franche-Comté
- Department: Saône-et-Loire
- No. of communes: {{{nbcomm}}}
- Disbanded: 2015
- Area: 155.14 km^{2} (59.90 sq mi)
- Population (2012): 4,118
  - Density: 26.54/km^{2} (68.75/sq mi)

The Canton of Saint-Gengoux-le-National is a French former canton, located in the arrondissement of Mâcon, in the Saône-et-Loire département (Burgundy région). It had 4,118 inhabitants (2012). It was disbanded following the French canton reorganisation which came into effect in March 2015. It consisted of 19 communes, which joined the canton of Cluny in 2015.

The canton comprised the following communes:

- Saint-Gengoux-le-National (seat)
- Ameugny
- Bissy-sous-Uxelles
- Bonnay
- Burnand
- Burzy
- Chapaize
- Chissey-lès-Mâcon
- Cormatin
- Cortevaix
- Curtil-sous-Burnand
- Malay
- Passy
- Sailly
- Saint-Huruge
- Saint-Ythaire
- Savigny-sur-Grosne
- Sigy-le-Châtel
- Taizé

== See also ==
- Cantons of the Saône-et-Loire department
- Arrondissements of the Saône-et-Loire department
