= Saint-Vincent-des-Prés =

Saint-Vincent-des-Prés may refer to two communes in France:

- Saint-Vincent-des-Prés, Saône-et-Loire, in the Saône-et-Loire département
- Saint-Vincent-des-Prés, Sarthe, in the Sarthe département
