= Blanot =

Blanot may refer to the following places in France:

- Blanot, Côte-d'Or, a commune in the department of Côte-d'Or
- Blanot, Saône-et-Loire, a commune in the department of Saône-et-Loire
