= Jérémy Decerle =

French politician (born 1984)

Jérémy Decerle MEP
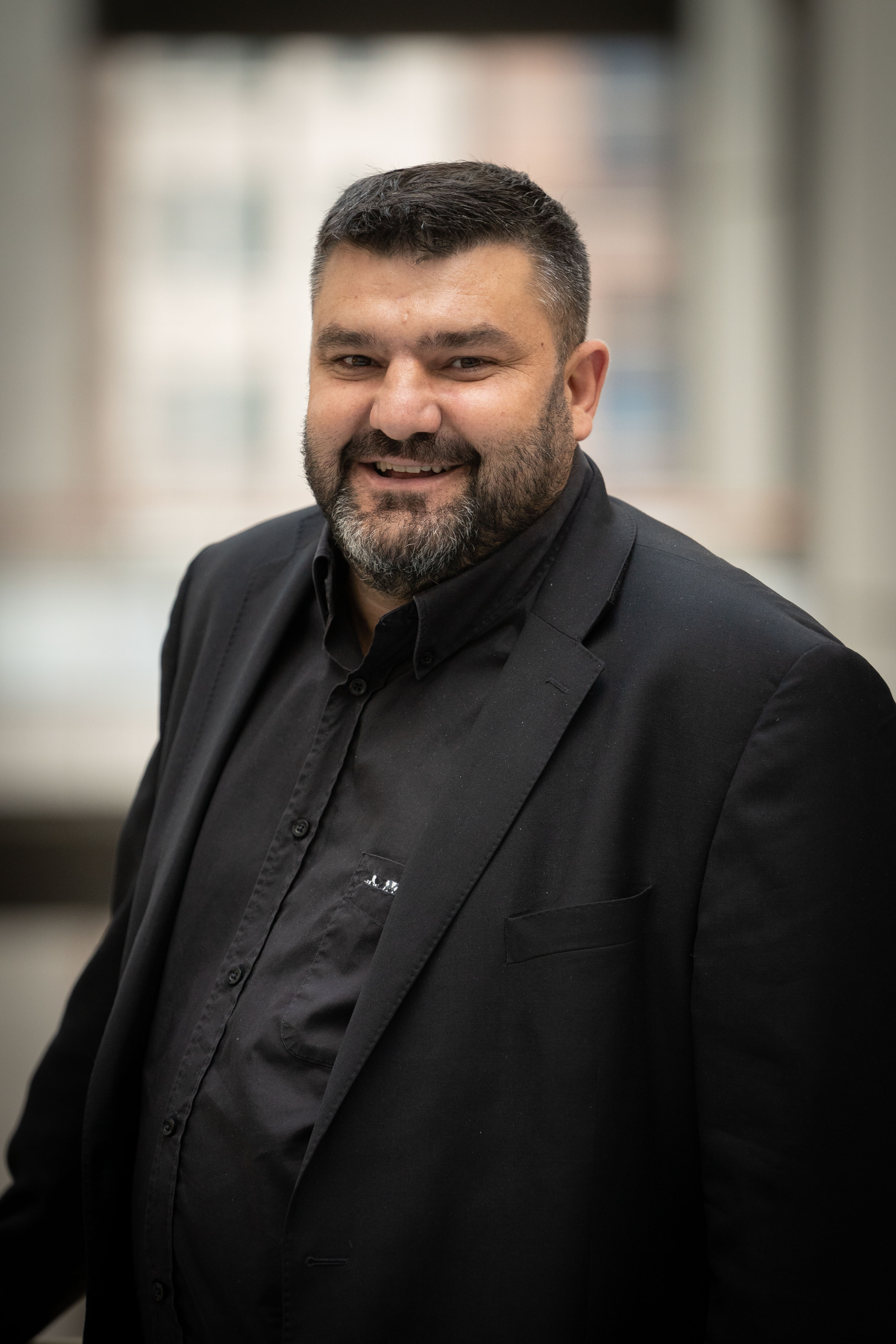

Member of the European Parliament for France
- In office 2 July 2019 – 15 July 2024

Personal details
- Born: 1 July 1984 (age 41) Saint-Rémy, France
- Party: Renew Europe (French delegation)
- Occupation: Farmer and politician
- Website: https://jeremydecerle.eu/

Jérémy Decerle (born 1 July 1984 in Saône-et-Loire) is a Charolais breeder, French politician and former trade unionist. He was president of the "Young Farmers" union from 2016 to 2019, before being elected Member of the European Parliament in 2019, on the list supported by Emmanuel Macron.

== Biography ==
=== Family ===
Jérémy Decerle was born in Saône-et-Loire. He grew up and lived in Chevagny-sur-Guye, in a family of farmers. His father Daniel Decerle was the socialist mayor of his commune and general councillor of the canton of La Guiche until his death in 2008. He is also the nephew of Christian Decerle, president of the Bourgogne-Franche-Comté Chamber of Agriculture.

=== Farmer ===
He studied at the Saint-Gengoux-le-National secondary school, at the Ressins private agricultural high school in Nandax (Loire), before obtaining his professional agricultural baccalaureate in Gueugnon. He then went to Brazil to work on a dairy farm. At the age of 24, he took over the family farm after his father's death. In 2019, his farm counts a hundred Charolais cattle on 100 ha.

=== Trade unionist and local representative ===
He started his involvement in trade unionism at the age of sixteen with "Jeunes agriculteurs (JA)", an independent union close to the FNSEA. He joined the organization's board in 2012. Two years later, he was elected vice president in charge of generational renewal. On 2 June 2016 he became president. During his term as president, he was particularly involved in generational renewal, and played an active role in the States General of Food (ÉGAlim). At that time, he was also vice-president of AFDI (French farmers and international development).

In addition, he was elected municipal councilor of his village in 2008 and re-elected in the 2014 and 2020 elections.

== Member of the European Parliament ==
=== Election ===
Candidate in the European elections of 2019, he ranked fourth on the Renaissance list of La République en marche. He withdrew from the presidency of the JA in March of the same year.

During the electoral campaign, he "defended a human-sized agriculture, respectful of the environment, [and] harmonized between the member countries of the European Union".

Since the beginning of his mandate, he is assisted by Marie-Julie Fayard (former parliamentary assistant to MEPs Arnaud Danjean and Anne Sander), as well as Aurélien Vaucelle, former director of Young Farmers. In March 2020, Victoria Zuza, former parliamentary assistant to British MP Martin Horwood (who lost his seat during the Brexit), also joined the team.

=== Parliamentary activities ===
He sits in the Committee on Agriculture and Rural Development (AGRI) as a full member, and in the Committee on International Trade (INTA) as a substitute. He is also involved in the Parliament's delegation for relations with Brazil. and for relations with the Pan-African Parliament.

==== Legislative work ====
Within the framework of his mandate, he was shadow rapporteur for Renew on several regulations related to the CAP reform. His profession as a breeder allowed him to establish himself as one of the pillars of his group on agricultural issues. After the adoption of the new CAP, he decided to share his experience as an MEP by undertaking, on 26 January 2020, a tour throughout France to explain/relay the major advances of the reform but also collect the expectations of farmers.

He was then appointed rapporteur of an evaluation report of the European Parliament analyzing the current European legislation on animal welfare on farms. The report was widely adopted on 16 February 2022 and was welcomed by the profession. He has also been the rapporteur for a number of other subjects related to agriculture and international trade.

In the autumn of 2022, as rapporteur for his political group, he began work on the proposed revision of EU legislation on industrial emissions (of great concern to livestock farmers).

In addition, he serves as the main rapporteur for the European Parliament on the drafting of the institution's position on the revision of the EU Farm Sustainability Data Network (FSDN).

==== Other activities as MEP ====
Following the invasion of Ukraine by Russia, he joined a working group on "Food Security", led by Dacian Ciolos and including several members of the Renew group. The aim is to evaluate and anticipate the impact of the conflict on food supply in Europe and the whole world. In this context, he travelled to Western Ukraine in June 2022 to meet with various actors in the Ukrainian agricultural sector.
