= Sailly =

Sailly may refer to the following places in France:

- Sailly, Ardennes, a commune in the Ardennes department
- Sailly, Haute-Marne, a commune in the Haute-Marne department
- Sailly, Saône-et-Loire, a commune in the Saône-et-Loire department
- Sailly, Yvelines, a commune in the Yvelines department
- Sailly-Laurette, a commune in the Somme department in Hauts-de-France
- Sailly-le-Sec, a commune in the Somme department in Hauts-de-France
- Sailly-Achâtel, a commune in the Moselle department in Grand Est
