= Bergesserin =

- Commune
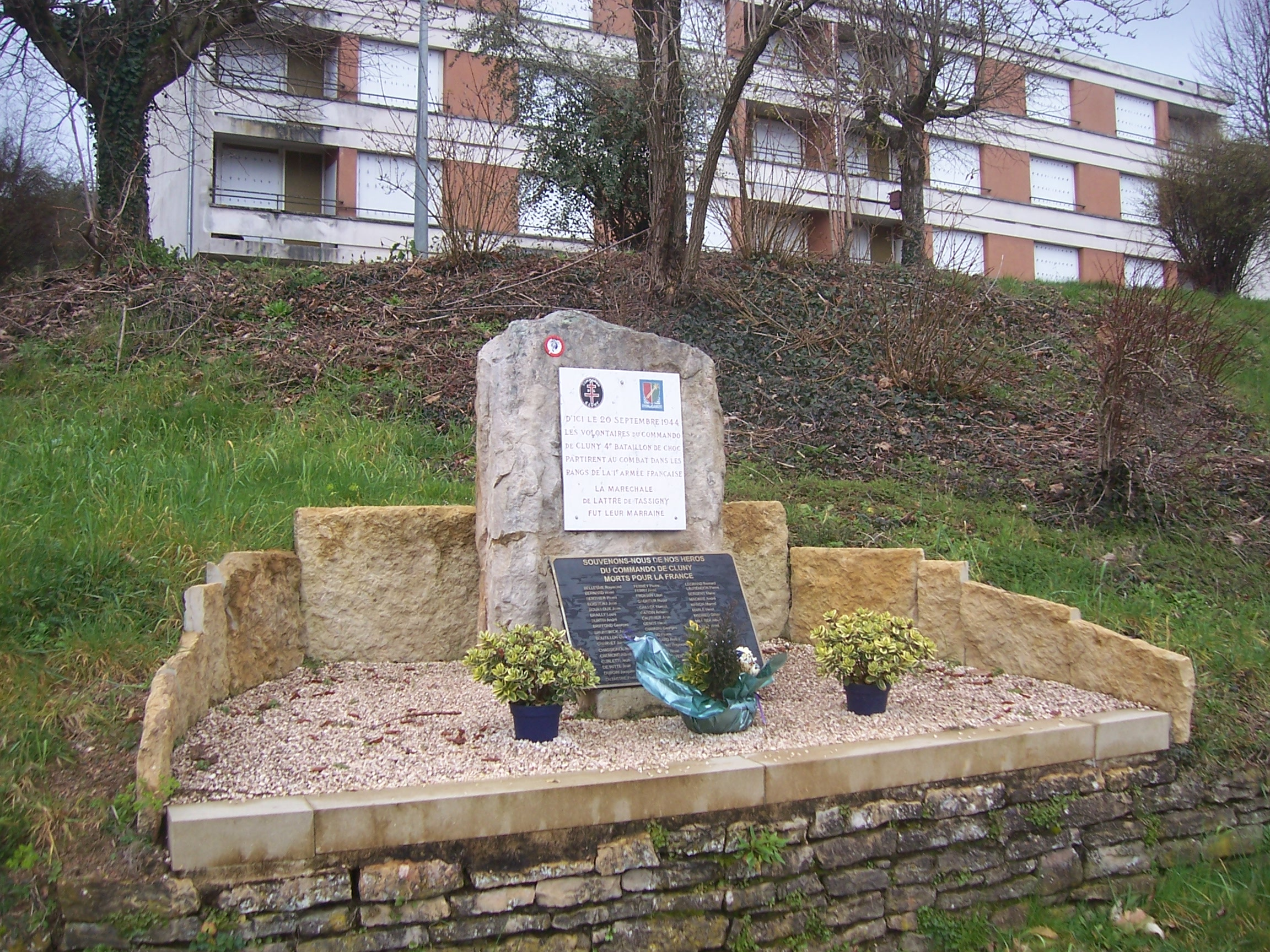
- War memorial
- Location of Bergesserin
- Location within France Location within Bourgogne-Franche-Comté
- Coordinates: 46°24′09″N 4°33′43″E
- Country: France
- Region: Bourgogne-Franche-Comté
- Department: Saône-et-Loire
- Arrondissement: Mâcon
- Canton: Cluny
- Intercommunality: Clunisois

Government
  - Mayor (2020–2026): Edith Legrand
- Area^{1}: 7.22 km^{2} (2.79 sq mi)
- Elevation: 500 m (1,600 ft)
- Highest elevation: 585 m (1,919 ft)
- Lowest elevation: 310 m (1,020 ft)
- Population (2023): 195
  - Density: 27.0/km^{2} (70.0/sq mi)
- Time zone: UTC+01:00 (CET)
  - Summer (DST): UTC+02:00 (CEST)
- INSEE/Postal code: 71030 /71250
- ^{1} French Land Register data, which excludes lakes, ponds, glaciers > 1 km^{2} (0.386 sq mi or 247 acres) and river estuaries.

Bergesserin is a commune in the Saône-et-Loire department in the region of Bourgogne-Franche-Comté in eastern France.

== Population ==
Historical population
Year	Pop.	±% p.a.
1968	338	—
1975	363	+1.02%
1982	352	−0.44%
1990	319	−1.22%
1999	332	+0.44%
2007	247	−3.63%
2012	240	−0.57%
2017	205	−3.10%
2023	195	−0.83%
Source: INSEE

== See also ==
- Communes of the Saône-et-Loire department
