= Donzy-le-Pertuis =

- Commune
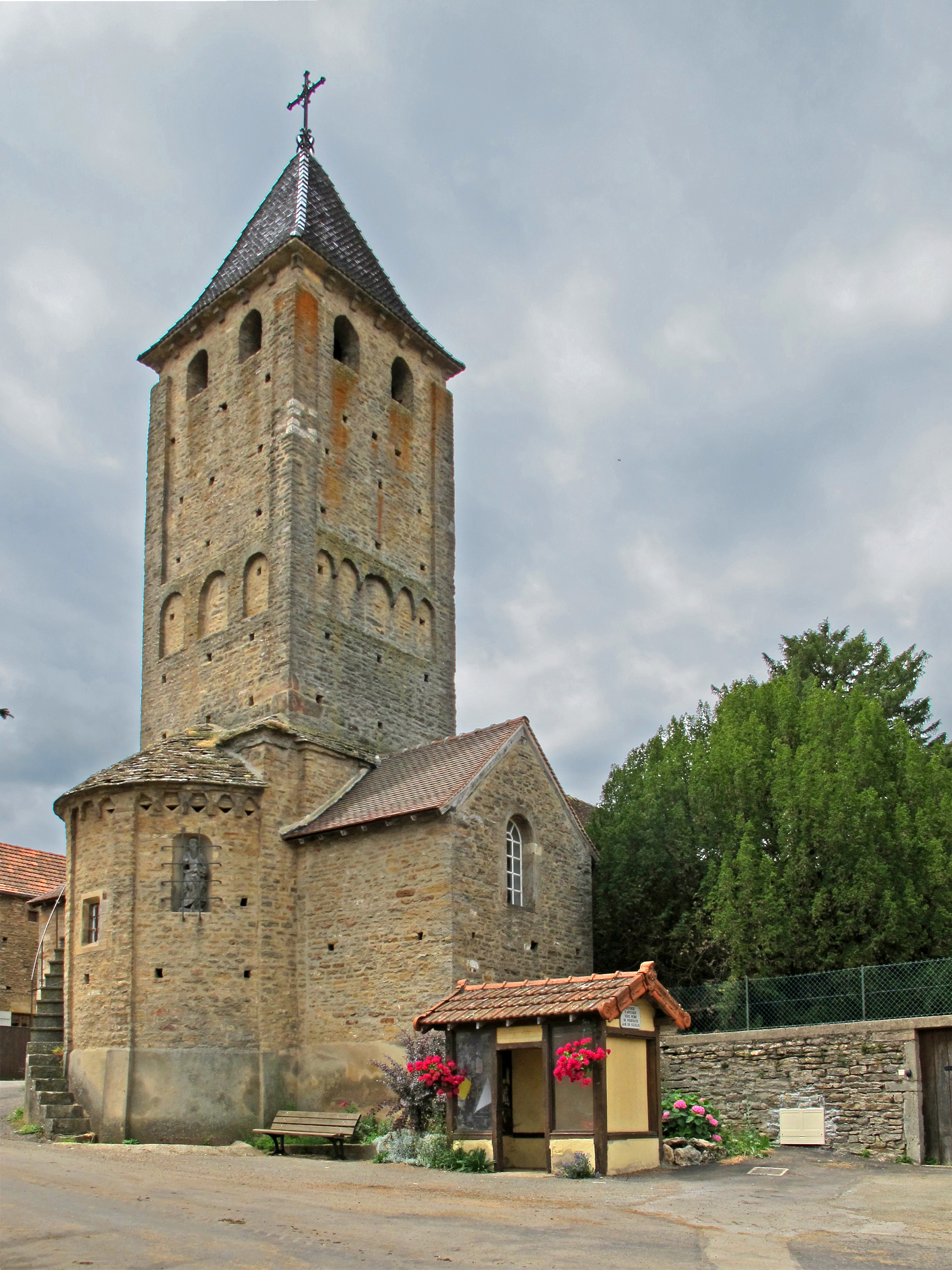
- The church in Donzy-le-Pertuis
- Location of Donzy-le-Pertuis
- Location within France Location within Bourgogne-Franche-Comté
- Coordinates: 46°27′06″N 4°43′17″E
- Country: France
- Region: Bourgogne-Franche-Comté
- Department: Saône-et-Loire
- Arrondissement: Mâcon
- Canton: Cluny
- Intercommunality: Clunisois

Government
  - Mayor (2020–2026): Patrice Gobin
- Area^{1}: 6.11 km^{2} (2.36 sq mi)
- Elevation: 472 m (1,549 ft)
- Highest elevation: 571 m (1,873 ft)
- Lowest elevation: 294 m (965 ft)
- Population (2023): 148
  - Density: 24.2/km^{2} (62.7/sq mi)
- Time zone: UTC+01:00 (CET)
  - Summer (DST): UTC+02:00 (CEST)
- INSEE/Postal code: 71181 /71250
- ^{1} French Land Register data, which excludes lakes, ponds, glaciers > 1 km^{2} (0.386 sq mi or 247 acres) and river estuaries.

Donzy-le-Pertuis (French pronunciation: [dɔ̃zi lə pɛʁtɥi]) is a commune in the Saône-et-Loire department in the region of Bourgogne-Franche-Comté in eastern France.

== See also ==
- Communes of the Saône-et-Loire department
