= Curtil-sous-Buffières =

- Commune
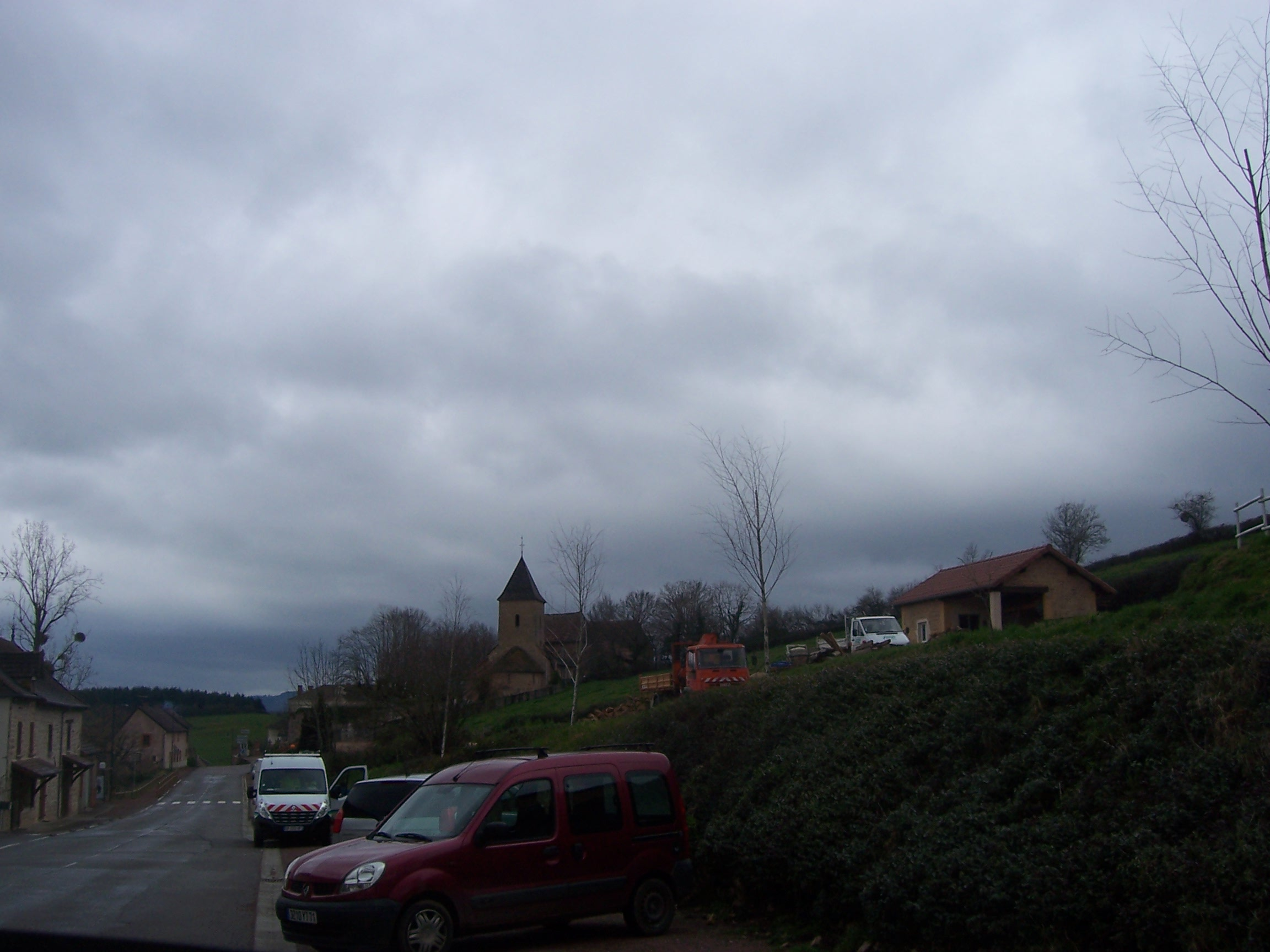
- The church and surroundings in Curtil-sous-Buffières
- Location of Curtil-sous-Buffières
- Location within France Location within Bourgogne-Franche-Comté
- Coordinates: 46°24′06″N 4°31′36″E
- Country: France
- Region: Bourgogne-Franche-Comté
- Department: Saône-et-Loire
- Arrondissement: Mâcon
- Canton: Cluny
- Intercommunality: Clunisois
- Area^{1}: 5.24 km^{2} (2.02 sq mi)
- Elevation: 404 m (1,325 ft)
- Highest elevation: 510 m (1,670 ft)
- Lowest elevation: 324 m (1,063 ft)
- Population (2023): 95
  - Density: 18/km^{2} (47/sq mi)
- Time zone: UTC+01:00 (CET)
  - Summer (DST): UTC+02:00 (CEST)
- INSEE/Postal code: 71163 /71520
- ^{1} French Land Register data, which excludes lakes, ponds, glaciers > 1 km^{2} (0.386 sq mi or 247 acres) and river estuaries.

Curtil-sous-Buffières is a commune in the Saône-et-Loire department in the region of Bourgogne-Franche-Comté in eastern France.

== See also ==
- Communes of the Saône-et-Loire department
