= Saint-Clément-sur-Guye =

- Commune
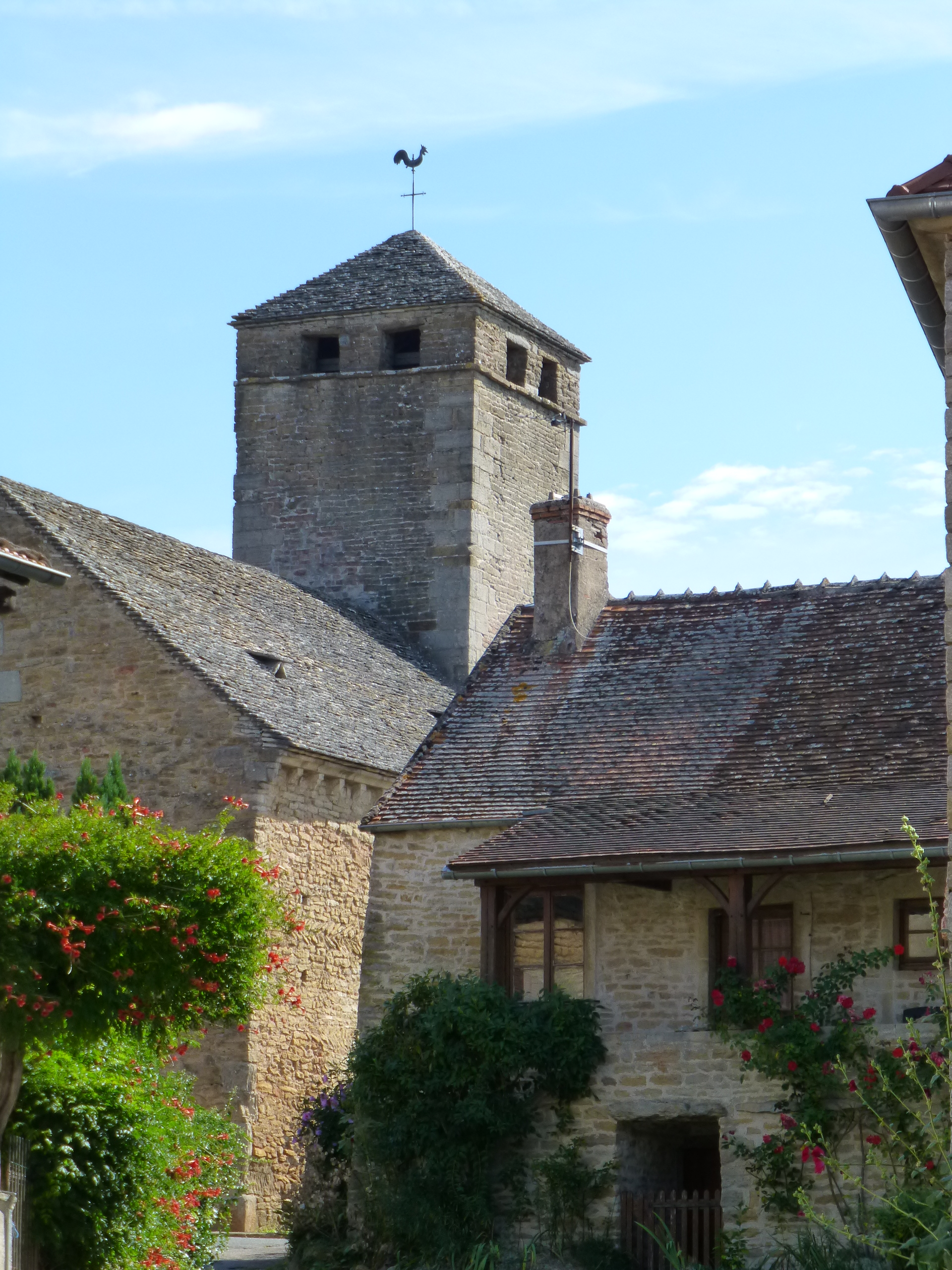
- The church in Saint-Clément-sur-Guye
- Location of Saint-Clément-sur-Guye
- Location within France Location within Bourgogne-Franche-Comté
- Coordinates: 46°37′01″N 4°35′07″E
- Country: France
- Region: Bourgogne-Franche-Comté
- Department: Saône-et-Loire
- Arrondissement: Mâcon
- Canton: Cluny

Government
  - Mayor (2020–2026): Thierry Demaizière
- Area^{1}: 7.4 km^{2} (2.9 sq mi)
- Elevation: 431 m (1,414 ft)
- Highest elevation: 437 m (1,434 ft)
- Lowest elevation: 230 m (750 ft)
- Population (2023): 140
  - Density: 19/km^{2} (49/sq mi)
- Time zone: UTC+01:00 (CET)
  - Summer (DST): UTC+02:00 (CEST)
- INSEE/Postal code: 71400 /71460
- ^{1} French Land Register data, which excludes lakes, ponds, glaciers > 1 km^{2} (0.386 sq mi or 247 acres) and river estuaries.

Saint-Clément-sur-Guye (French pronunciation: [sɛ̃ klemɑ̃ syʁ ɡi], literally Saint-Clément on Guye) is a commune in the Saône-et-Loire department in the region of Bourgogne-Franche-Comté in eastern France.

== See also ==
- Communes of the Saône-et-Loire department
