= Vaux-en-Pré =

- Commune
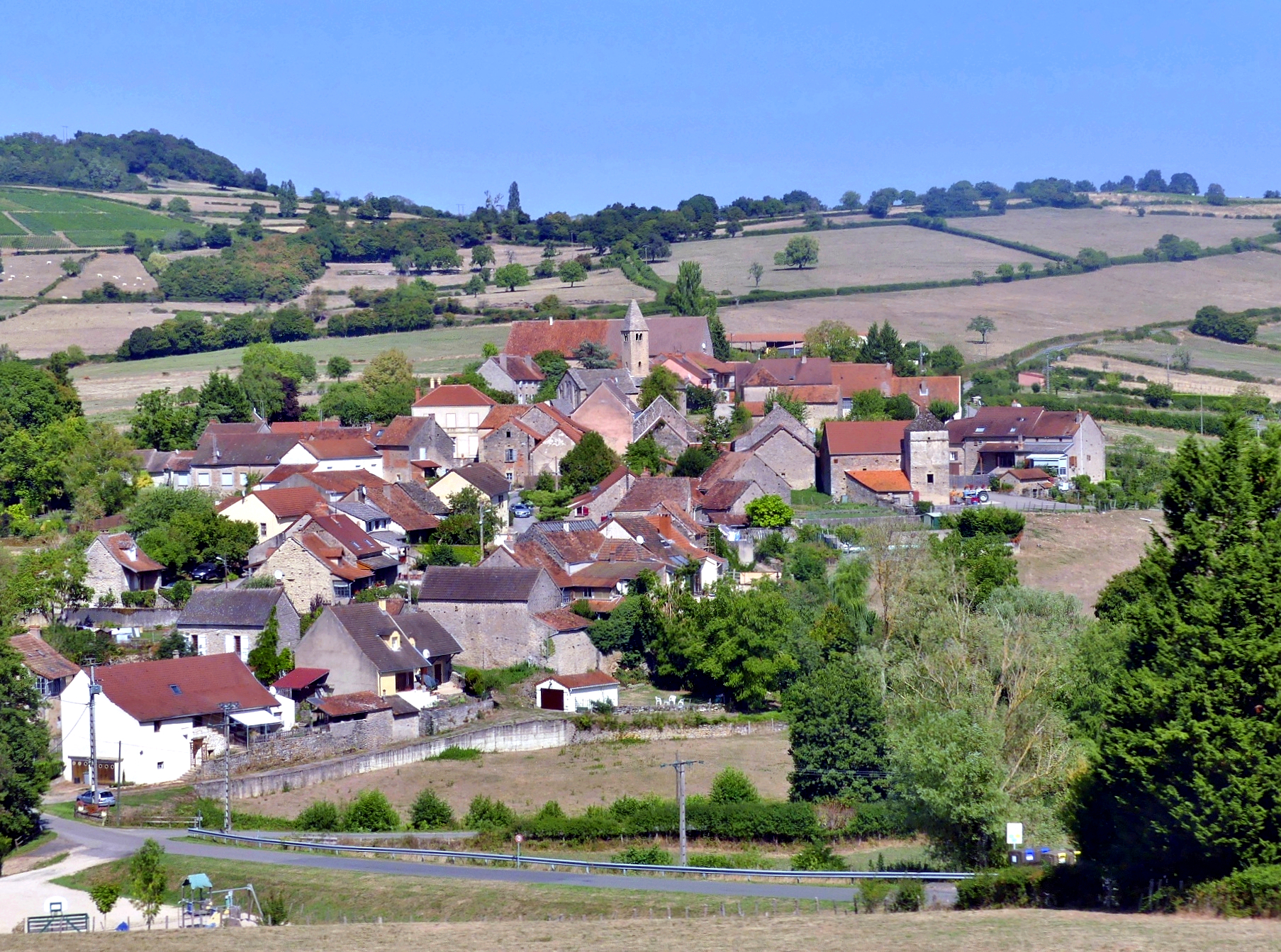
- A general view of Vaux-en-Pré
- Location of Vaux-en-Pré
- Location within France Location within Bourgogne-Franche-Comté
- Coordinates: 46°37′40″N 4°35′57″E
- Country: France
- Region: Bourgogne-Franche-Comté
- Department: Saône-et-Loire
- Arrondissement: Chalon-sur-Saône
- Canton: Cluny
- Area^{1}: 4.39 km^{2} (1.69 sq mi)
- Elevation: 284 m (932 ft)
- Highest elevation: 415 m (1,362 ft)
- Lowest elevation: 262 m (860 ft)
- Population (2023): 79
  - Density: 18/km^{2} (47/sq mi)
- Time zone: UTC+01:00 (CET)
  - Summer (DST): UTC+02:00 (CEST)
- INSEE/Postal code: 71563 /71460
- ^{1} French Land Register data, which excludes lakes, ponds, glaciers > 1 km^{2} (0.386 sq mi or 247 acres) and river estuaries.

Vaux-en-Pré (French pronunciation: [vo ɑ̃ pʁe]) is a commune in the Saône-et-Loire department in the region of Bourgogne-Franche-Comté in eastern France.

== See also ==
- Communes of the Saône-et-Loire department
