= Pressy-sous-Dondin =

- Commune
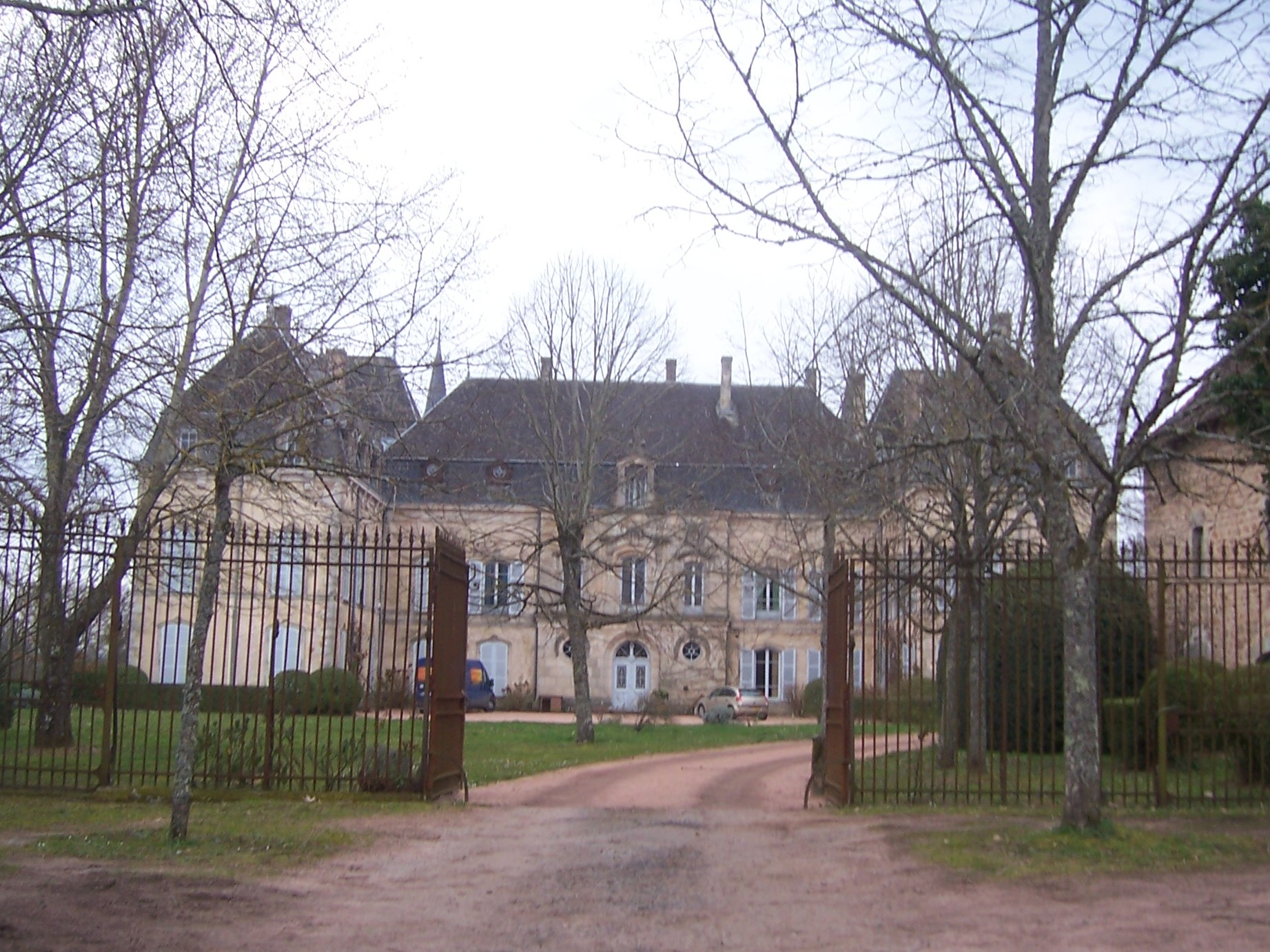
- Chateau
- Location of Pressy-sous-Dondin
- Location within France Location within Bourgogne-Franche-Comté
- Coordinates: 46°28′32″N 4°30′42″E
- Country: France
- Region: Bourgogne-Franche-Comté
- Department: Saône-et-Loire
- Arrondissement: Mâcon
- Canton: Cluny
- Area^{1}: 12.38 km^{2} (4.78 sq mi)
- Elevation: 315 m (1,033 ft)
- Highest elevation: 445 m (1,460 ft)
- Lowest elevation: 236 m (774 ft)
- Population (2023): 101
  - Density: 8.16/km^{2} (21.1/sq mi)
- Time zone: UTC+01:00 (CET)
  - Summer (DST): UTC+02:00 (CEST)
- INSEE/Postal code: 71358 /71220
- ^{1} French Land Register data, which excludes lakes, ponds, glaciers > 1 km^{2} (0.386 sq mi or 247 acres) and river estuaries.

Pressy-sous-Dondin is a commune in the Saône-et-Loire department in the region of Bourgogne-Franche-Comté in eastern France.

== See also ==
- Communes of the Saône-et-Loire department
