= Buffières =

- Commune
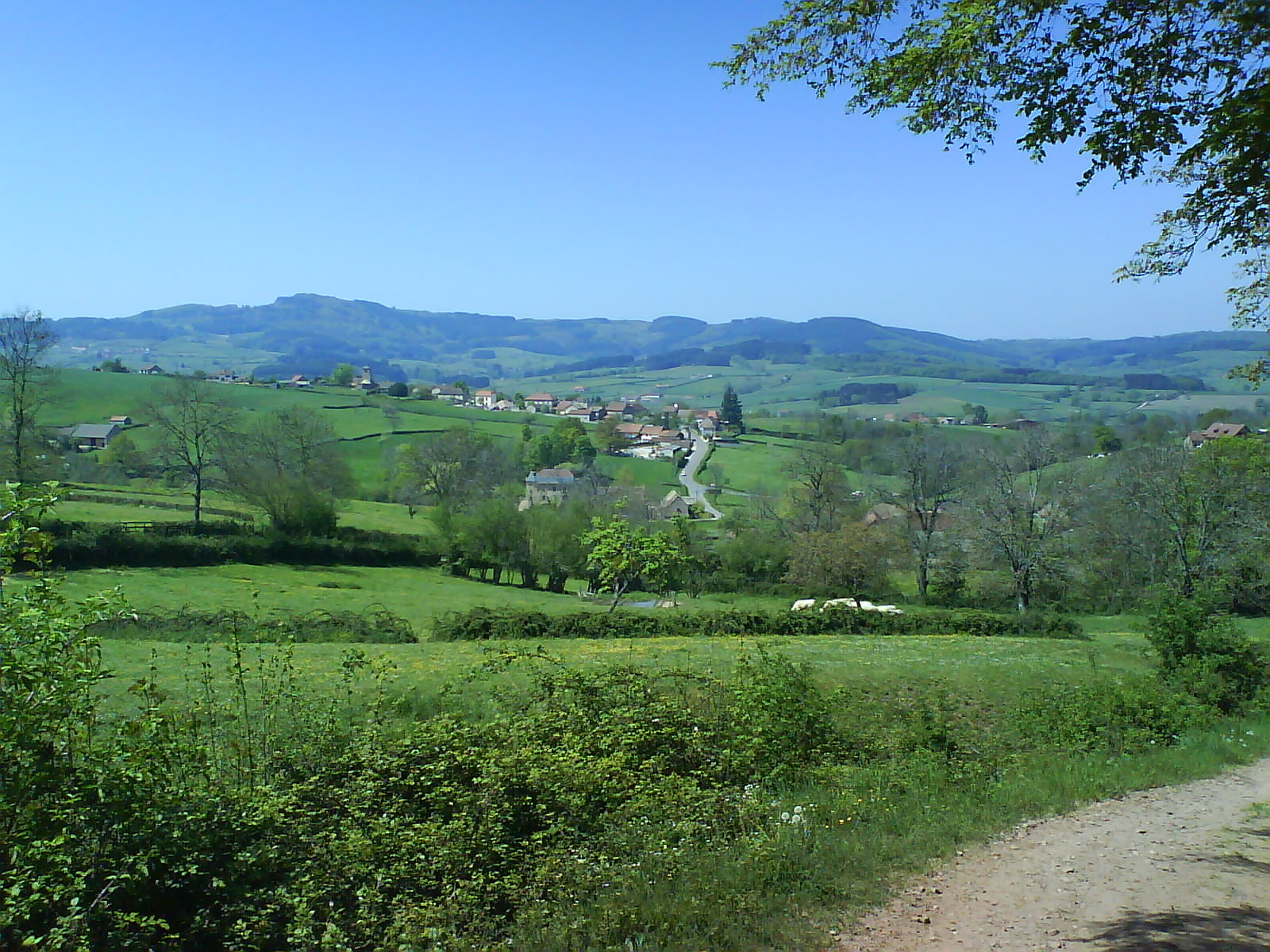
- A general view of Buffières
- Location of Buffières
- Location within France Location within Bourgogne-Franche-Comté
- Coordinates: 46°25′51″N 4°32′21″E
- Country: France
- Region: Bourgogne-Franche-Comté
- Department: Saône-et-Loire
- Arrondissement: Mâcon
- Canton: Cluny
- Intercommunality: Clunisois
- Area^{1}: 12.13 km^{2} (4.68 sq mi)
- Elevation: 325 m (1,066 ft)
- Highest elevation: 553 m (1,814 ft)
- Lowest elevation: 250 m (820 ft)
- Population (2023): 273
  - Density: 22.5/km^{2} (58.3/sq mi)
- Time zone: UTC+01:00 (CET)
  - Summer (DST): UTC+02:00 (CEST)
- INSEE/Postal code: 71065 /71250
- ^{1} French Land Register data, which excludes lakes, ponds, glaciers > 1 km^{2} (0.386 sq mi or 247 acres) and river estuaries.

Buffières (French pronunciation: [byfjɛʁ]) is a commune in the Saône-et-Loire department in the region of Bourgogne-Franche-Comté in eastern France.

== See also ==
- Communes of the Saône-et-Loire department
