= Flagy, Saône-et-Loire =

Flagy
- Commune
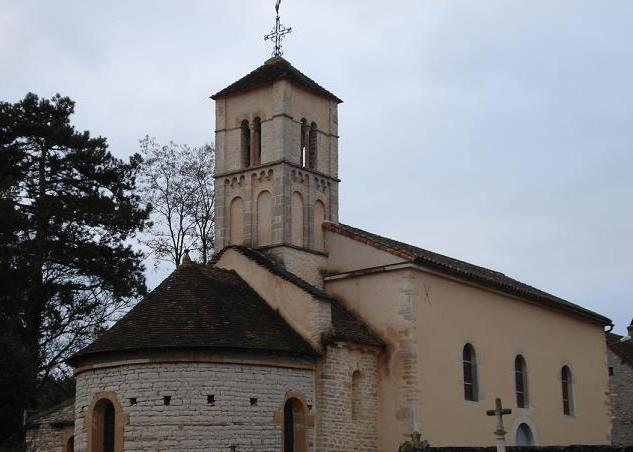
- The church in Flagy
- Location of Flagy
- Location within France Location within Bourgogne-Franche-Comté
- Coordinates: 46°30′01″N 4°38′23″E
- Country: France
- Region: Bourgogne-Franche-Comté
- Department: Saône-et-Loire
- Arrondissement: Mâcon
- Canton: Cluny
- Area^{1}: 8.38 km^{2} (3.24 sq mi)
- Elevation: 260 m (850 ft)
- Highest elevation: 436 m (1,430 ft)
- Lowest elevation: 229 m (751 ft)
- Population (2023): 175
  - Density: 20.9/km^{2} (54.1/sq mi)
- Time zone: UTC+01:00 (CET)
  - Summer (DST): UTC+02:00 (CEST)
- INSEE/Postal code: 71199 /71250
- ^{1} French Land Register data, which excludes lakes, ponds, glaciers > 1 km^{2} (0.386 sq mi or 247 acres) and river estuaries.

Flagy (French pronunciation: [flaʒi]) is a commune in the Saône-et-Loire department in the region of Bourgogne-Franche-Comté in eastern France.

== See also ==
- Communes of the Saône-et-Loire department
