= Saint-André-le-Désert =

- Commune
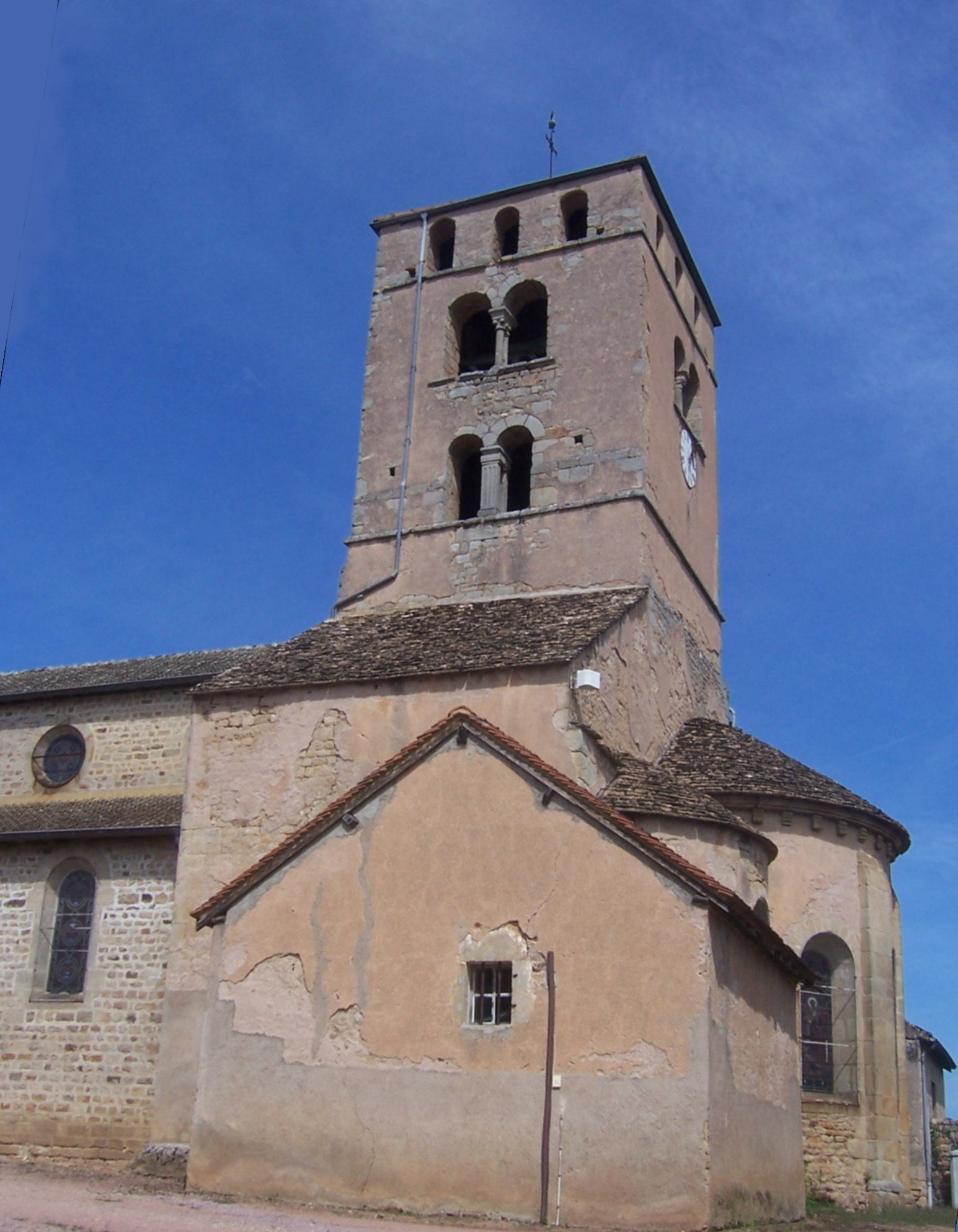
- The church in Saint-André-le-Désert
- Location of Saint-André-le-Désert
- Location within France Location within Bourgogne-Franche-Comté
- Coordinates: 46°29′43″N 4°31′55″E
- Country: France
- Region: Bourgogne-Franche-Comté
- Department: Saône-et-Loire
- Arrondissement: Mâcon
- Canton: Cluny
- Area^{1}: 17.87 km^{2} (6.90 sq mi)
- Elevation: 250 m (820 ft)
- Highest elevation: 466 m (1,529 ft)
- Lowest elevation: 222 m (728 ft)
- Population (2023): 243
  - Density: 13.6/km^{2} (35.2/sq mi)
- Time zone: UTC+01:00 (CET)
  - Summer (DST): UTC+02:00 (CEST)
- INSEE/Postal code: 71387 /71220
- ^{1} French Land Register data, which excludes lakes, ponds, glaciers > 1 km^{2} (0.386 sq mi or 247 acres) and river estuaries.

Saint-André-le-Désert is a commune in the Saône-et-Loire department in the region of Bourgogne-Franche-Comté in eastern France.

== See also ==
- Communes of the Saône-et-Loire department
