= Saint-Martin-de-Salencey =

- Commune
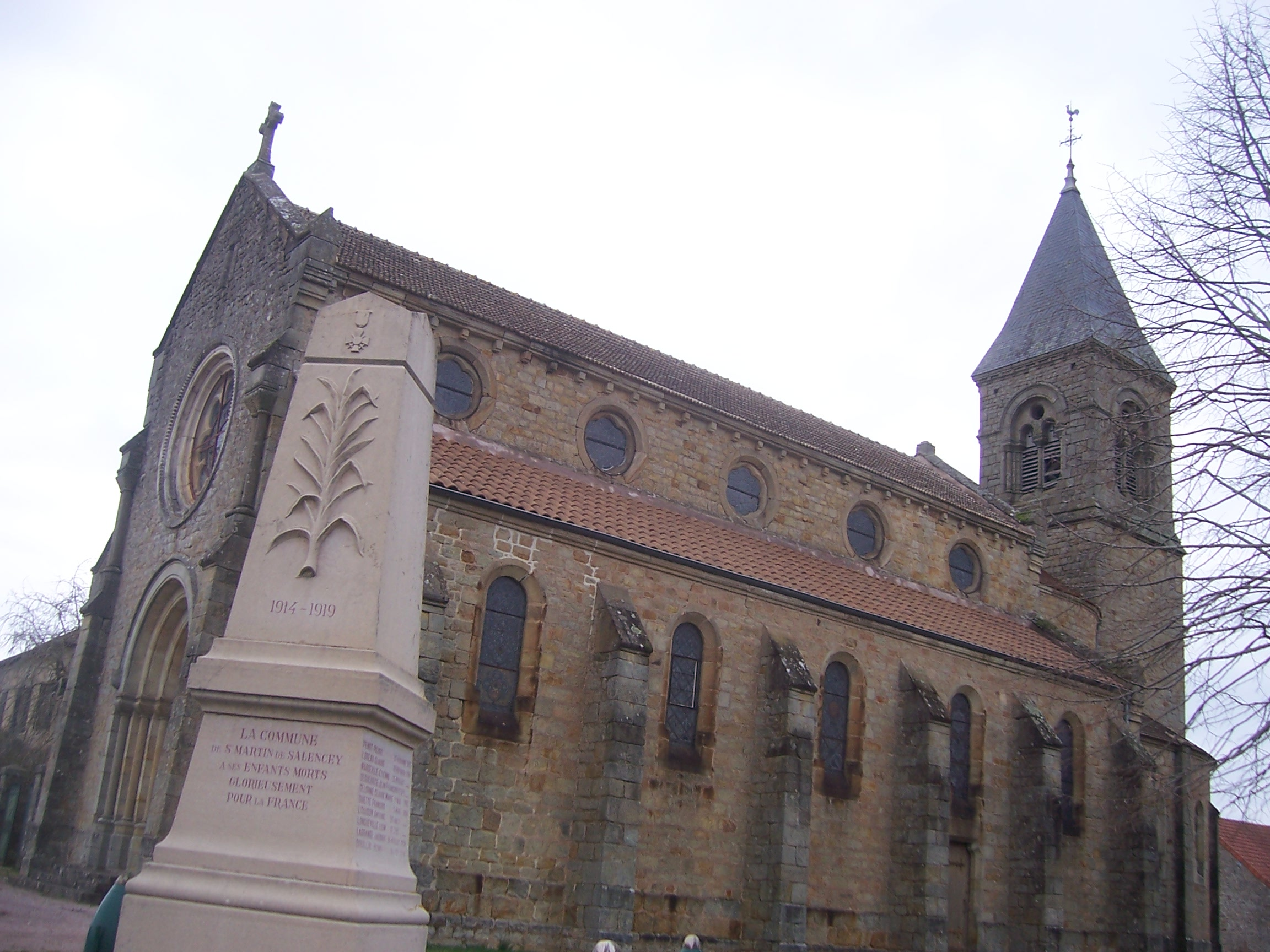
- The church in Saint-Martin-de-Salencey
- Location of Saint-Martin-de-Salencey
- Location within France Location within Bourgogne-Franche-Comté
- Coordinates: 46°31′23″N 4°30′13″E
- Country: France
- Region: Bourgogne-Franche-Comté
- Department: Saône-et-Loire
- Arrondissement: Mâcon
- Canton: Cluny
- Area^{1}: 15.78 km^{2} (6.09 sq mi)
- Elevation: 381 m (1,250 ft)
- Highest elevation: 500 m (1,600 ft)
- Lowest elevation: 238 m (781 ft)
- Population (2023): 116
  - Density: 7.35/km^{2} (19.0/sq mi)
- Time zone: UTC+01:00 (CET)
  - Summer (DST): UTC+02:00 (CEST)
- INSEE/Postal code: 71452 /71220
- ^{1} French Land Register data, which excludes lakes, ponds, glaciers > 1 km^{2} (0.386 sq mi or 247 acres) and river estuaries.

Saint-Martin-de-Salencey (French pronunciation: [sɛ̃ maʁtɛ̃ də salɑ̃sɛ]) is a commune in the Saône-et-Loire department in the region of Bourgogne-Franche-Comté in eastern France.

== See also ==
- Communes of the Saône-et-Loire department
