= Sivignon =

- Commune
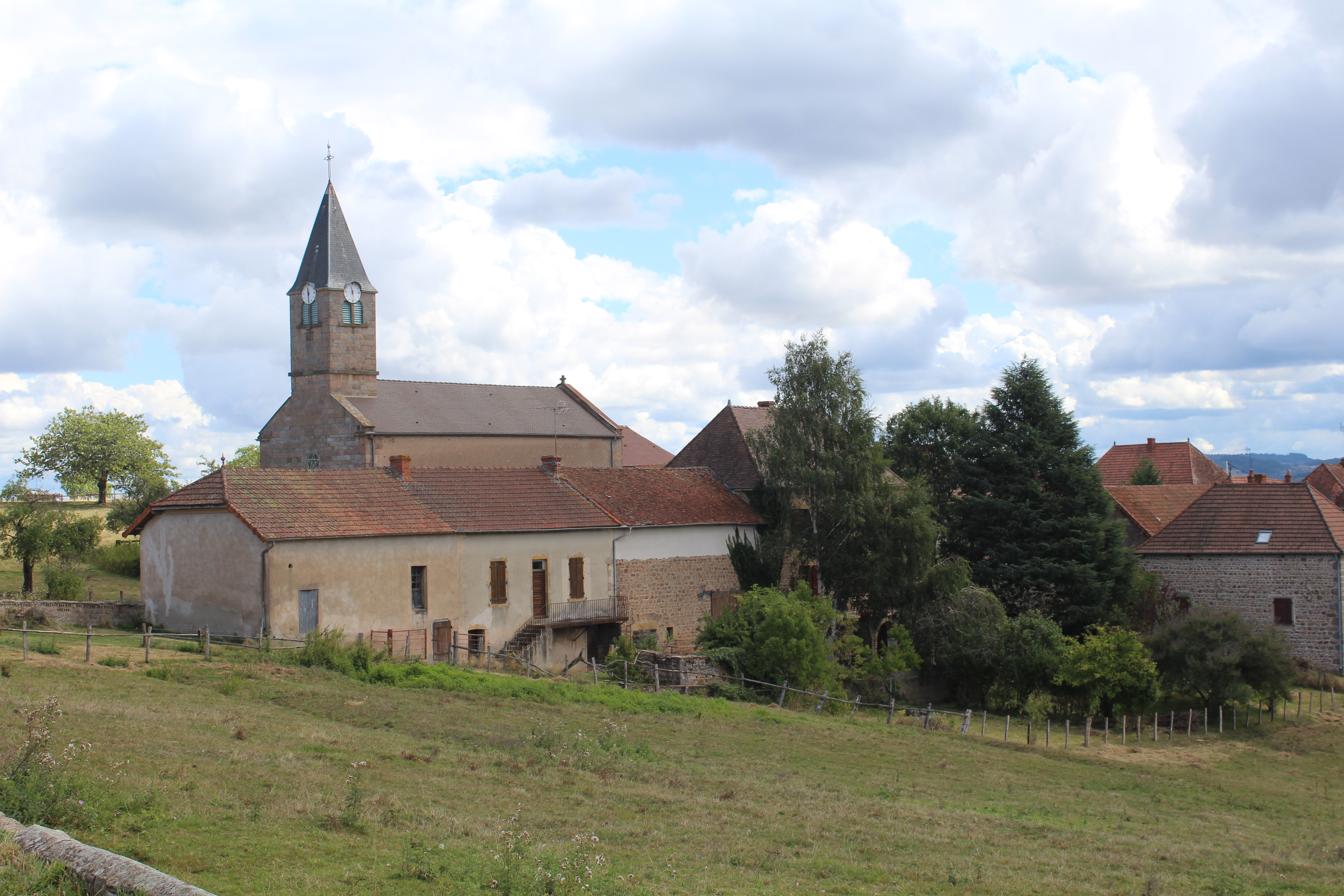
- The church in Sivignon
- Location of Sivignon
- Location within France Location within Bourgogne-Franche-Comté
- Coordinates: 46°25′39″N 4°30′00″E
- Country: France
- Region: Bourgogne-Franche-Comté
- Department: Saône-et-Loire
- Arrondissement: Mâcon
- Canton: Cluny
- Area^{1}: 12.5 km^{2} (4.8 sq mi)
- Elevation: 315 m (1,033 ft)
- Highest elevation: 509 m (1,670 ft)
- Lowest elevation: 274 m (899 ft)
- Population (2023): 178
  - Density: 14.2/km^{2} (36.9/sq mi)
- Time zone: UTC+01:00 (CET)
  - Summer (DST): UTC+02:00 (CEST)
- INSEE/Postal code: 71524 /71220
- ^{1} French Land Register data, which excludes lakes, ponds, glaciers > 1 km^{2} (0.386 sq mi or 247 acres) and river estuaries.

Sivignon (French pronunciation: [siviɲɔ̃]) is a commune in the Saône-et-Loire department in the region of Bourgogne-Franche-Comté in eastern France.

Sivignon is located beneath La Butte de Suin. It has a village called Le Martrat.

== See also ==
- Communes of the Saône-et-Loire department
