= Chiddes, Saône-et-Loire =

Chiddes
- Commune
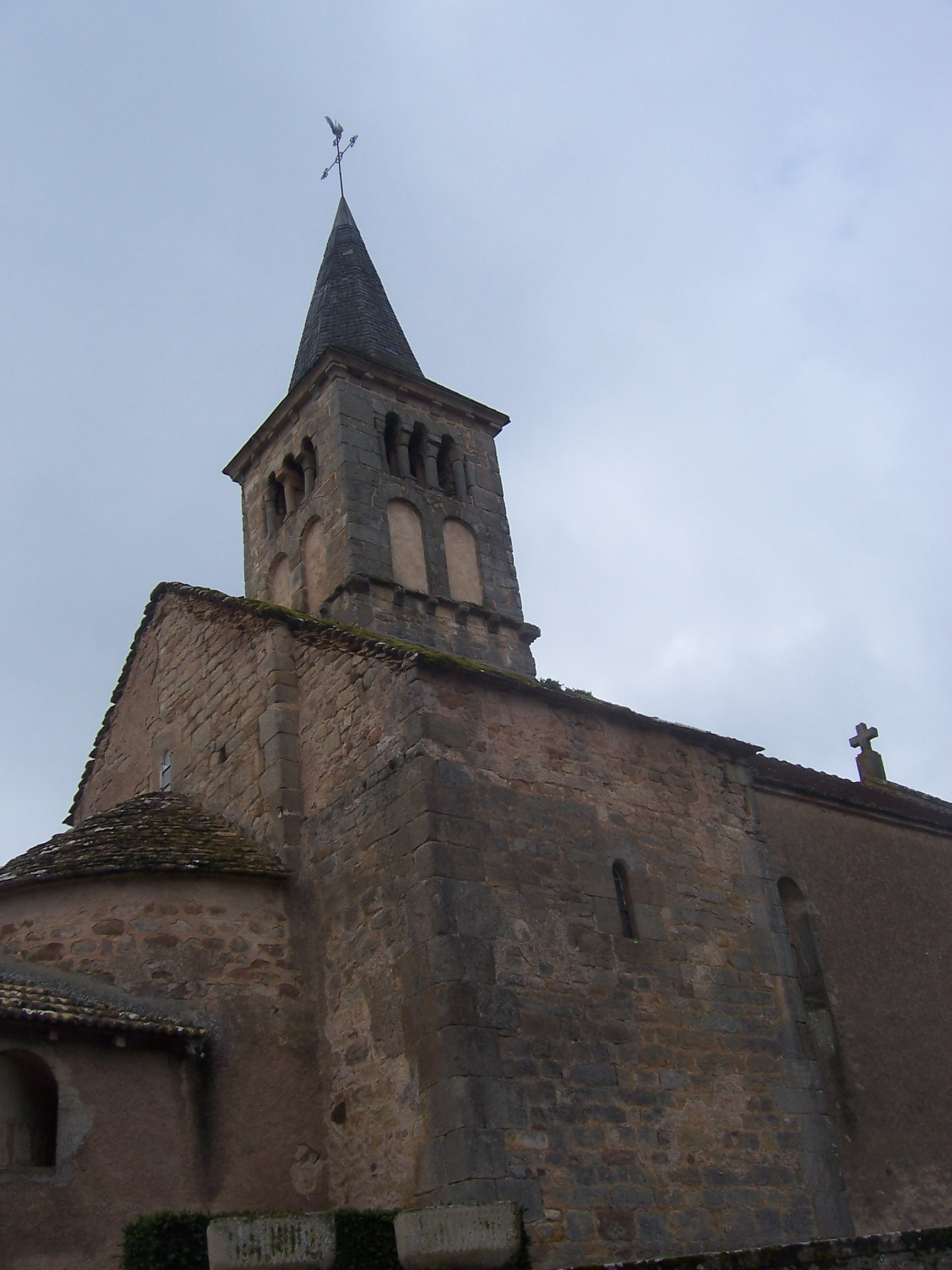
- The church in Chiddes
- Location of Chiddes
- Location within France Location within Bourgogne-Franche-Comté
- Coordinates: 46°27′27″N 4°30′55″E
- Country: France
- Region: Bourgogne-Franche-Comté
- Department: Saône-et-Loire
- Arrondissement: Mâcon
- Canton: Cluny

Government
  - Mayor (2020–2026): Josette Deschanel
- Area^{1}: 7.61 km^{2} (2.94 sq mi)
- Elevation: 490 m (1,610 ft)
- Highest elevation: 456 m (1,496 ft)
- Lowest elevation: 247 m (810 ft)
- Population (2023): 84
  - Density: 11/km^{2} (29/sq mi)
- Time zone: UTC+01:00 (CET)
  - Summer (DST): UTC+02:00 (CEST)
- INSEE/Postal code: 71128 /71220
- ^{1} French Land Register data, which excludes lakes, ponds, glaciers > 1 km^{2} (0.386 sq mi or 247 acres) and river estuaries.

Chiddes (French pronunciation: [ʃid]) is a commune in the Saône-et-Loire department in the region of Bourgogne-Franche-Comté in eastern France.

== See also ==
- Communes of the Saône-et-Loire department
