= Saint-Marcelin-de-Cray =

- Commune
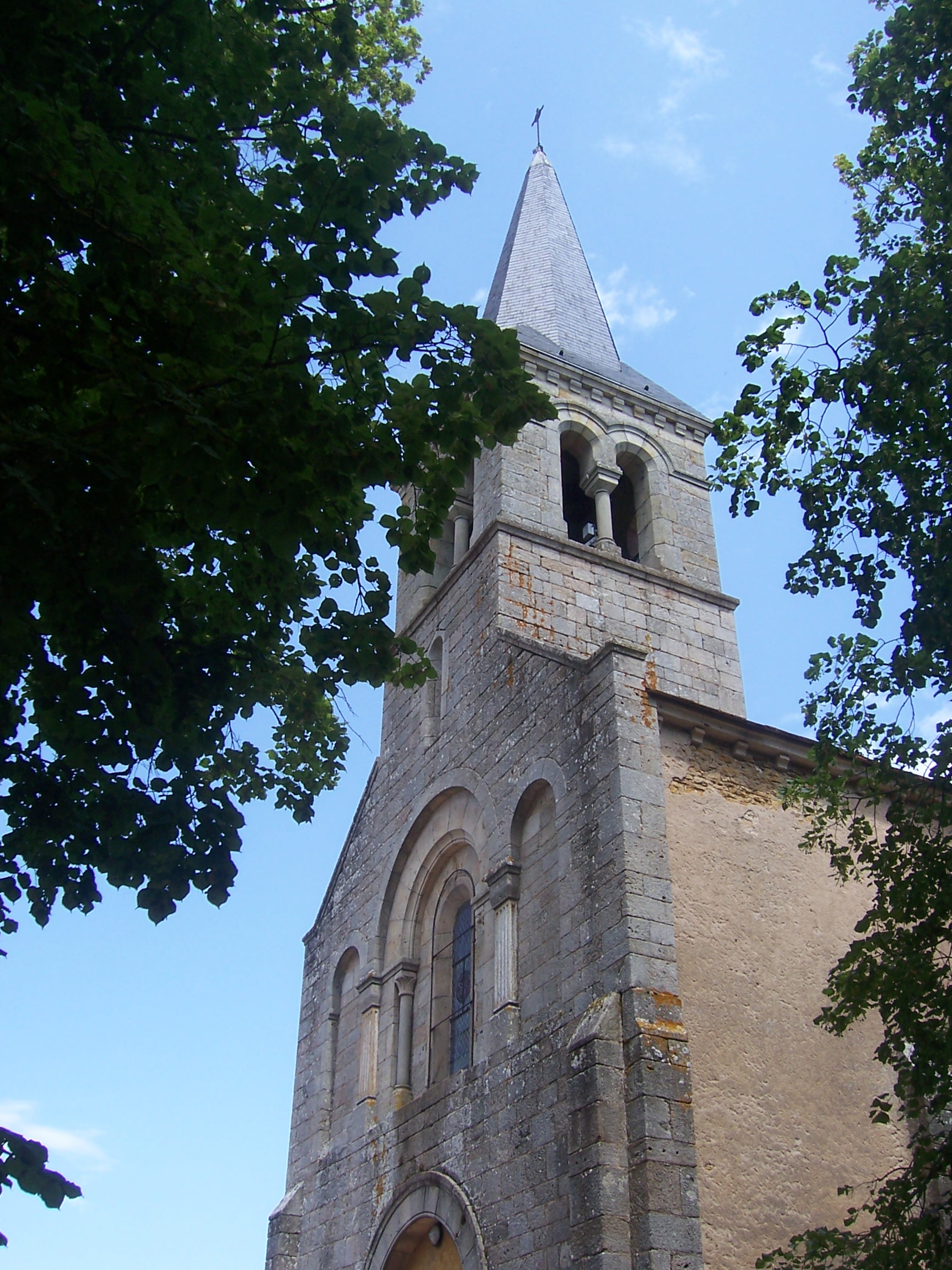
- The church of Saint-Marcelin in Saint-Marcelin-de-Cray
- Location of Saint-Marcelin-de-Cray
- Location within France Location within Bourgogne-Franche-Comté
- Coordinates: 46°33′35″N 4°31′56″E
- Country: France
- Region: Bourgogne-Franche-Comté
- Department: Saône-et-Loire
- Arrondissement: Mâcon
- Canton: Cluny
- Area^{1}: 13.58 km^{2} (5.24 sq mi)
- Elevation: 250 m (820 ft)
- Highest elevation: 445 m (1,460 ft)
- Lowest elevation: 218 m (715 ft)
- Population (2023): 193
  - Density: 14.2/km^{2} (36.8/sq mi)
- Time zone: UTC+01:00 (CET)
  - Summer (DST): UTC+02:00 (CEST)
- INSEE/Postal code: 71446 /71460
- ^{1} French Land Register data, which excludes lakes, ponds, glaciers > 1 km^{2} (0.386 sq mi or 247 acres) and river estuaries.

Saint-Marcelin-de-Cray (French pronunciation: [sɛ̃ maʁsəlɛ̃ də kʁɛ]) is a commune in the Saône-et-Loire department in the region of Bourgogne-Franche-Comté in eastern France.

== See also ==
- Communes of the Saône-et-Loire department
