= Château, Saône-et-Loire =

Château
- Commune
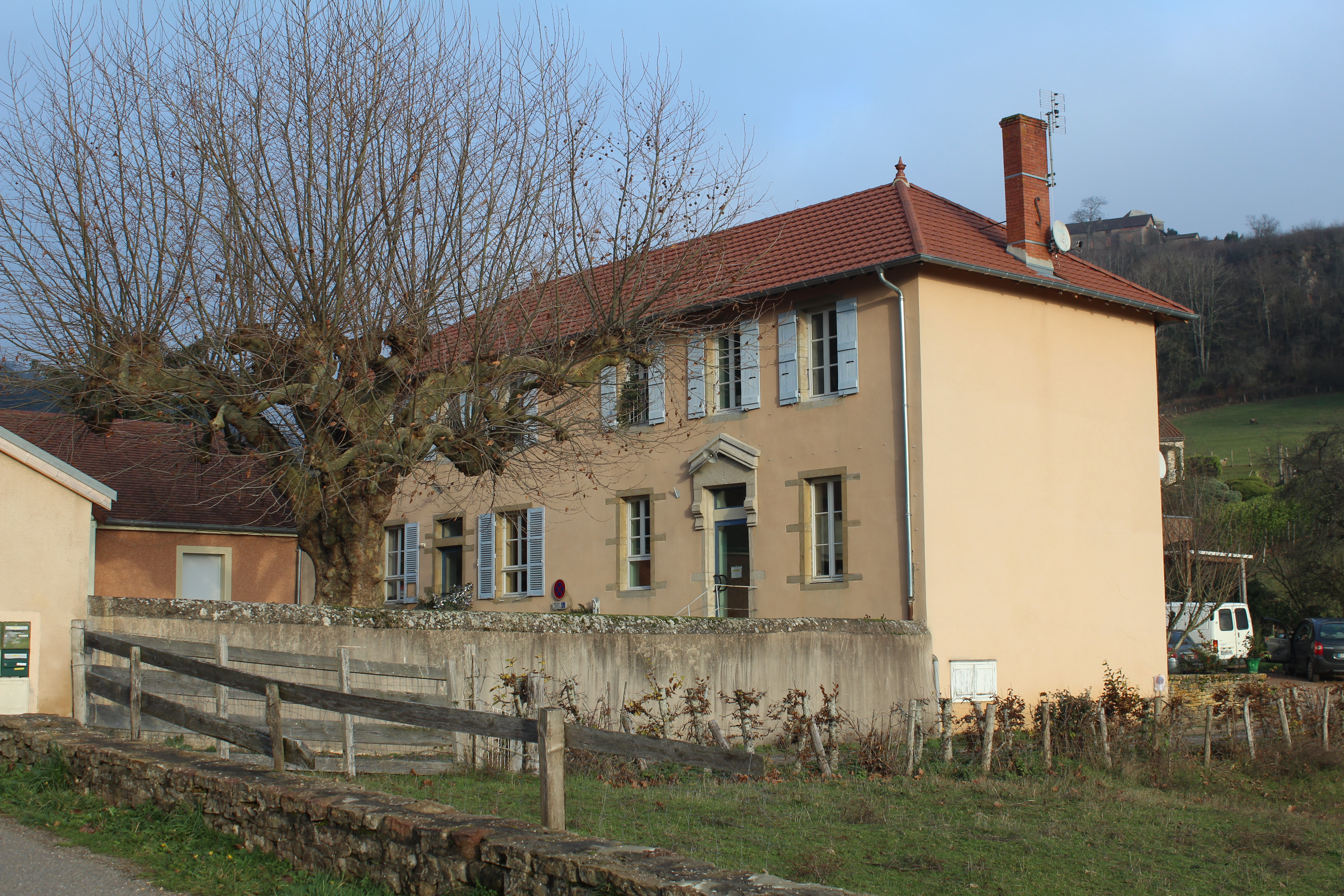
- The town hall in Château
- Location of Château
- Location within France Location within Bourgogne-Franche-Comté
- Coordinates: 46°25′41″N 4°36′09″E
- Country: France
- Region: Bourgogne-Franche-Comté
- Department: Saône-et-Loire
- Arrondissement: Mâcon
- Canton: Cluny
- Intercommunality: Clunisois
- Area^{1}: 13.63 km^{2} (5.26 sq mi)
- Elevation: 345 m (1,132 ft)
- Highest elevation: 573 m (1,880 ft)
- Lowest elevation: 284 m (932 ft)
- Population (2023): 229
  - Density: 16.8/km^{2} (43.5/sq mi)
- Time zone: UTC+01:00 (CET)
  - Summer (DST): UTC+02:00 (CEST)
- INSEE/Postal code: 71112 /71250
- ^{1} French Land Register data, which excludes lakes, ponds, glaciers > 1 km^{2} (0.386 sq mi or 247 acres) and river estuaries.

Château (French pronunciation: [ʃato]) is a commune in the Saône-et-Loire department in the region of Bourgogne-Franche-Comté in eastern France.

== See also ==
- Communes of the Saône-et-Loire department
