= Chérizet =

- Commune
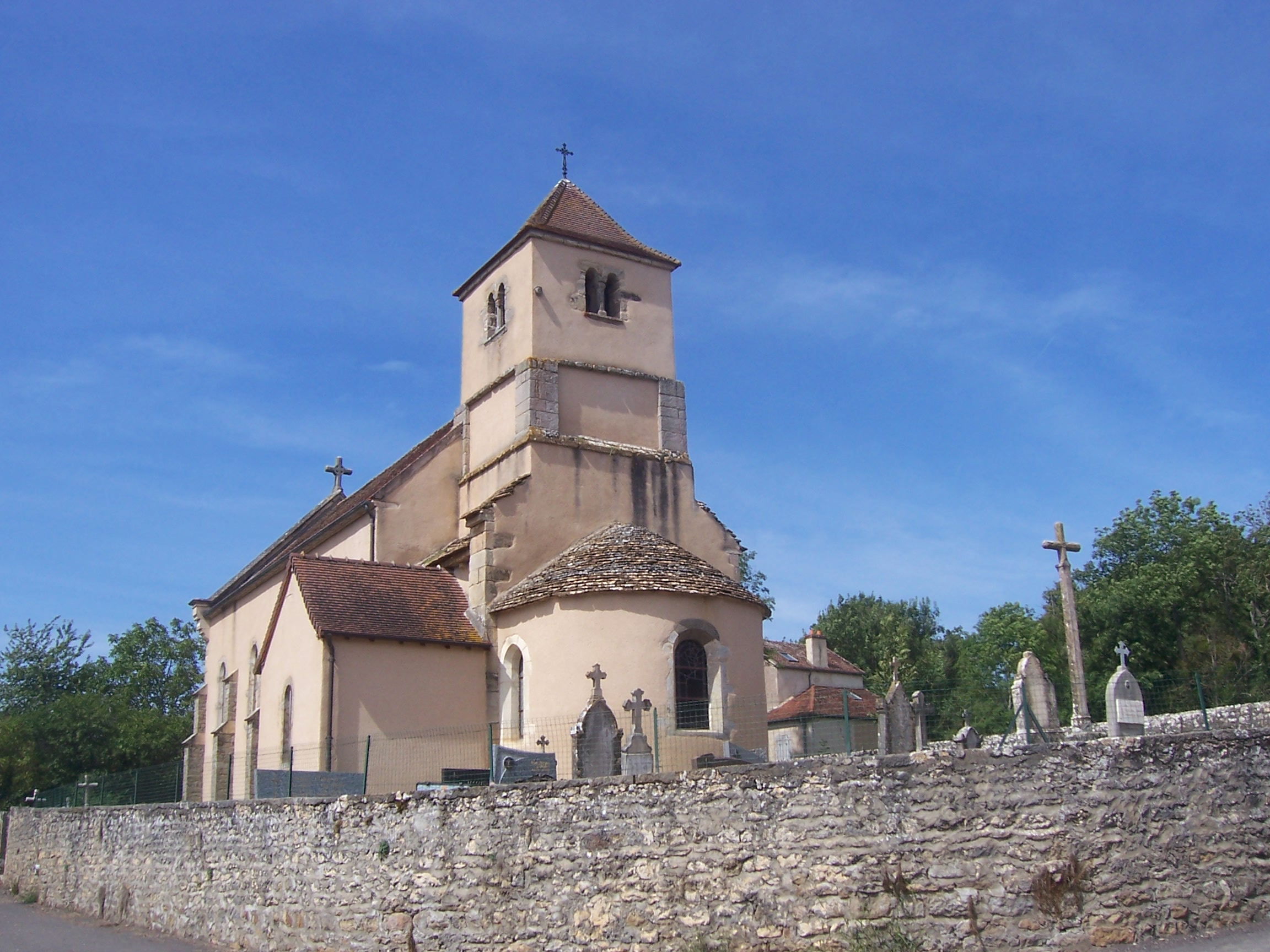
- The church in Chérizet
- Location of Chérizet
- Location within France Location within Bourgogne-Franche-Comté
- Coordinates: 46°31′06″N 4°34′18″E
- Country: France
- Region: Bourgogne-Franche-Comté
- Department: Saône-et-Loire
- Arrondissement: Mâcon
- Canton: Cluny
- Area^{1}: 2.88 km^{2} (1.11 sq mi)
- Elevation: 220 m (720 ft)
- Highest elevation: 385 m (1,263 ft)
- Lowest elevation: 212 m (696 ft)
- Population (2023): 18
  - Density: 6.2/km^{2} (16/sq mi)
- Time zone: UTC+01:00 (CET)
  - Summer (DST): UTC+02:00 (CEST)
- INSEE/Postal code: 71125 /71250
- ^{1} French Land Register data, which excludes lakes, ponds, glaciers > 1 km^{2} (0.386 sq mi or 247 acres) and river estuaries.

Chérizet (French pronunciation: [ʃeʁizɛ]) is a commune in the Saône-et-Loire department in the region of Bourgogne-Franche-Comté in eastern France.

== See also ==
- Communes of the Saône-et-Loire department
