= Blanot, Saône-et-Loire =

Blanot
- Commune
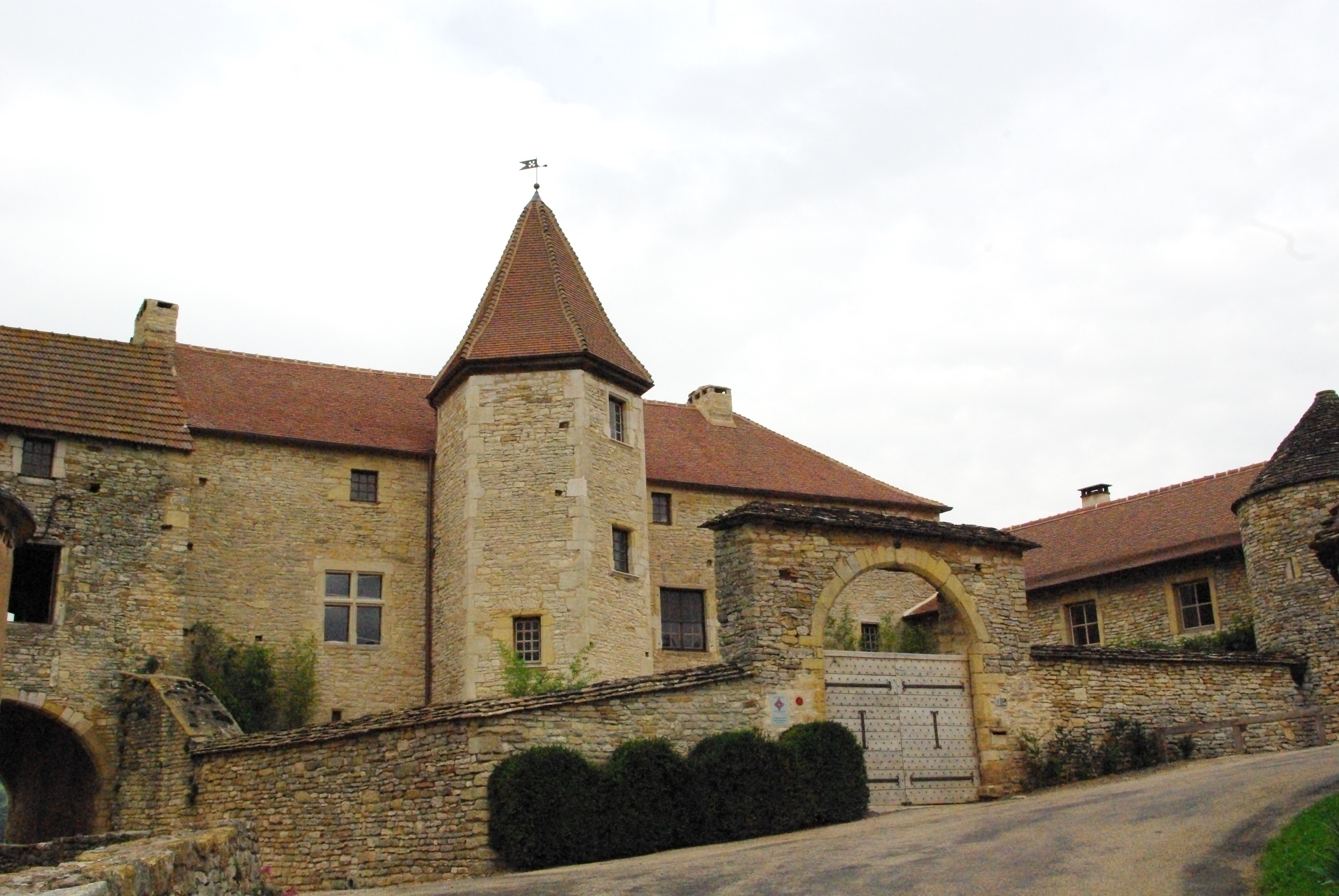
- Priory
- Location of Blanot
- Location within France Location within Bourgogne-Franche-Comté
- Coordinates: 46°28′27″N 4°44′07″E
- Country: France
- Region: Bourgogne-Franche-Comté
- Department: Saône-et-Loire
- Arrondissement: Mâcon
- Canton: Cluny
- Intercommunality: Clunisois
- Area^{1}: 11.52 km^{2} (4.45 sq mi)
- Elevation: 579 m (1,900 ft)
- Highest elevation: 576 m (1,890 ft)
- Lowest elevation: 265 m (869 ft)
- Population (2023): 203
  - Density: 17.6/km^{2} (45.6/sq mi)
- Time zone: UTC+01:00 (CET)
  - Summer (DST): UTC+02:00 (CEST)
- INSEE/Postal code: 71039 /71250
- ^{1} French Land Register data, which excludes lakes, ponds, glaciers > 1 km^{2} (0.386 sq mi or 247 acres) and river estuaries.

Blanot (French pronunciation: [blano]) is a commune in the Saône-et-Loire department in the region of Bourgogne-Franche-Comté in eastern France.

== See also ==
- Communes of the Saône-et-Loire department
