= Chevagny-sur-Guye =

- Commune
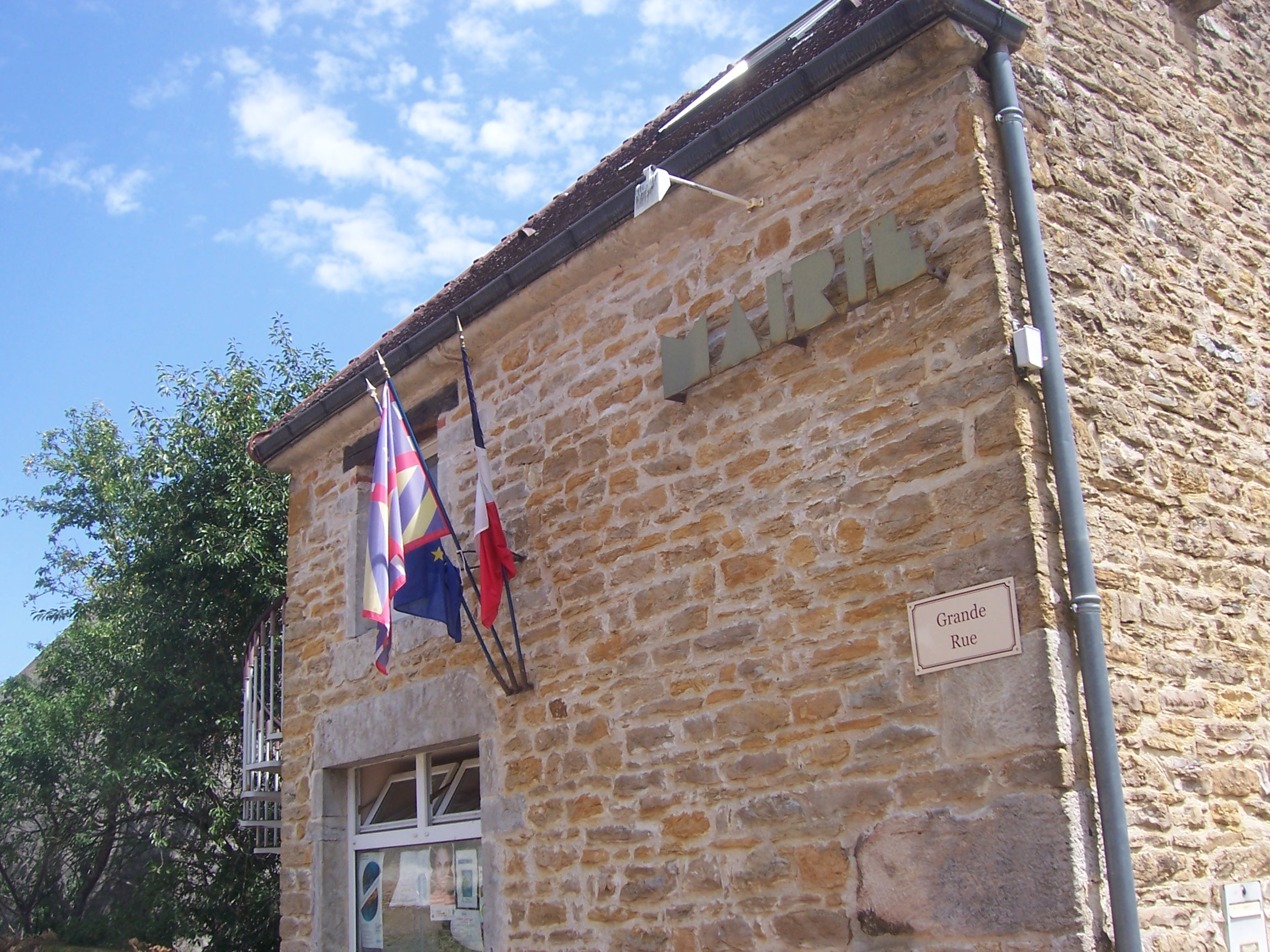
- Town hall
- Location of Chevagny-sur-Guye
- Location within France Location within Bourgogne-Franche-Comté
- Coordinates: 46°32′23″N 4°30′30″E
- Country: France
- Region: Bourgogne-Franche-Comté
- Department: Saône-et-Loire
- Arrondissement: Mâcon
- Canton: Cluny
- Intercommunality: Clunisois
- Area^{1}: 6.29 km^{2} (2.43 sq mi)
- Elevation: 250 m (820 ft)
- Highest elevation: 470 m (1,540 ft)
- Lowest elevation: 237 m (778 ft)
- Population (2023): 50
  - Density: 7.9/km^{2} (21/sq mi)
- Time zone: UTC+01:00 (CET)
  - Summer (DST): UTC+02:00 (CEST)
- INSEE/Postal code: 71127 /71220
- ^{1} French Land Register data, which excludes lakes, ponds, glaciers > 1 km^{2} (0.386 sq mi or 247 acres) and river estuaries.

Chevagny-sur-Guye (French pronunciation: [ʃəvaɲi syʁ ɡi], literally Chevagny on Guye) is a commune in the Saône-et-Loire department in the region of Bourgogne-Franche-Comté in eastern France.

== See also ==
- Communes of the Saône-et-Loire department
