= Cortevaix =

- Commune
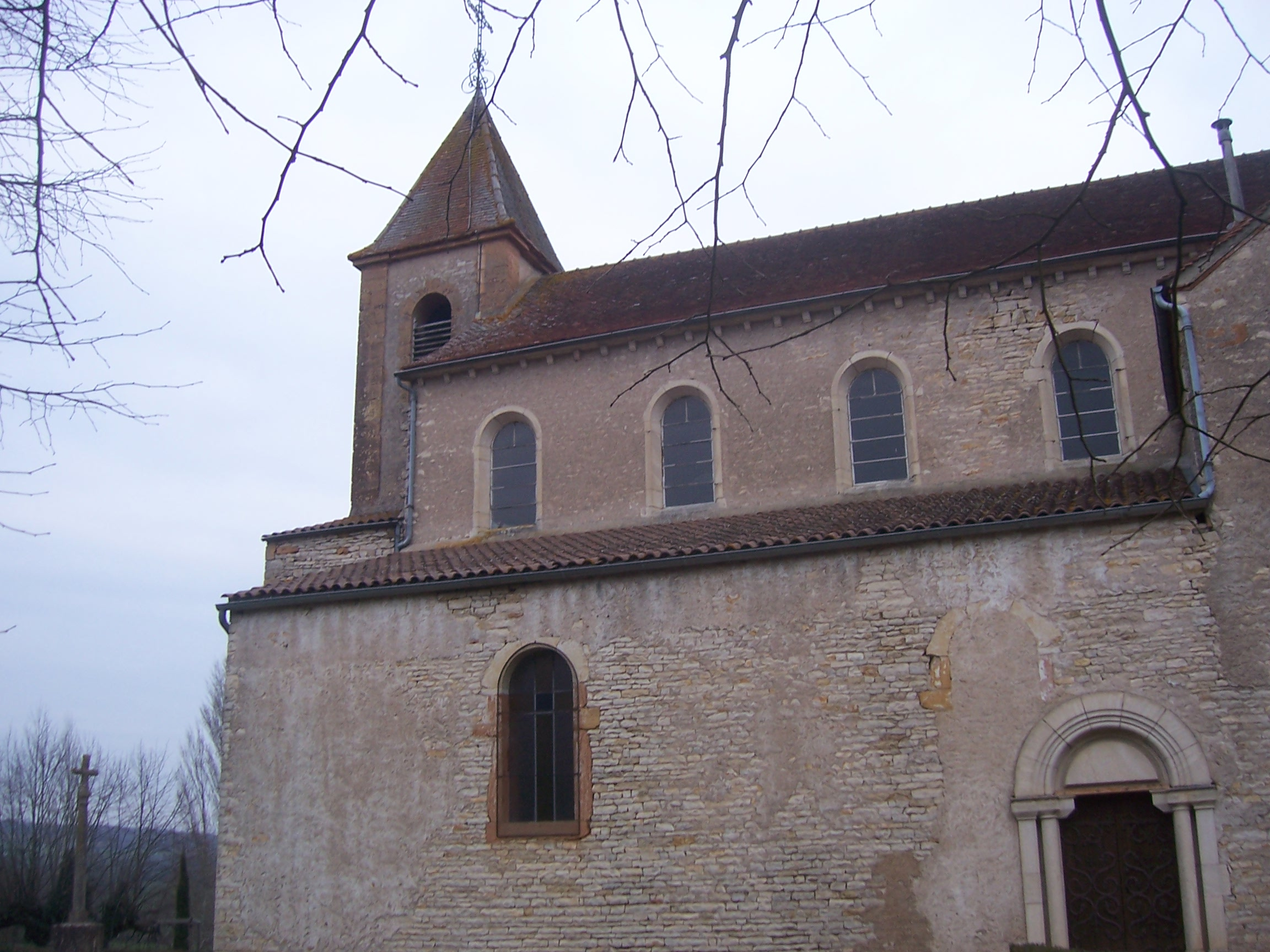
- The church in Cortevaix

- Coat of arms
- Location of Cortevaix
- Location within France Location within Bourgogne-Franche-Comté
- Coordinates: 46°32′13″N 4°38′23″E
- Country: France
- Region: Bourgogne-Franche-Comté
- Department: Saône-et-Loire
- Arrondissement: Mâcon
- Canton: Cluny
- Intercommunality: CC du Clunisois

Government
  - Mayor (2020–2026): Aymar De Camas
- Area^{1}: 10.42 km^{2} (4.02 sq mi)
- Elevation: 348 m (1,142 ft)
- Highest elevation: 407 m (1,335 ft)
- Lowest elevation: 201 m (659 ft)
- Population (2023): 247
  - Density: 23.7/km^{2} (61.4/sq mi)
- Time zone: UTC+01:00 (CET)
  - Summer (DST): UTC+02:00 (CEST)
- INSEE/Postal code: 71147 /71460
- ^{1} French Land Register data, which excludes lakes, ponds, glaciers > 1 km^{2} (0.386 sq mi or 247 acres) and river estuaries.

Cortevaix is a commune in the Saône-et-Loire department in the region of Bourgogne-Franche-Comté in eastern France.

== See also ==
- Communes of the Saône-et-Loire department
