= Burzy =

- Commune
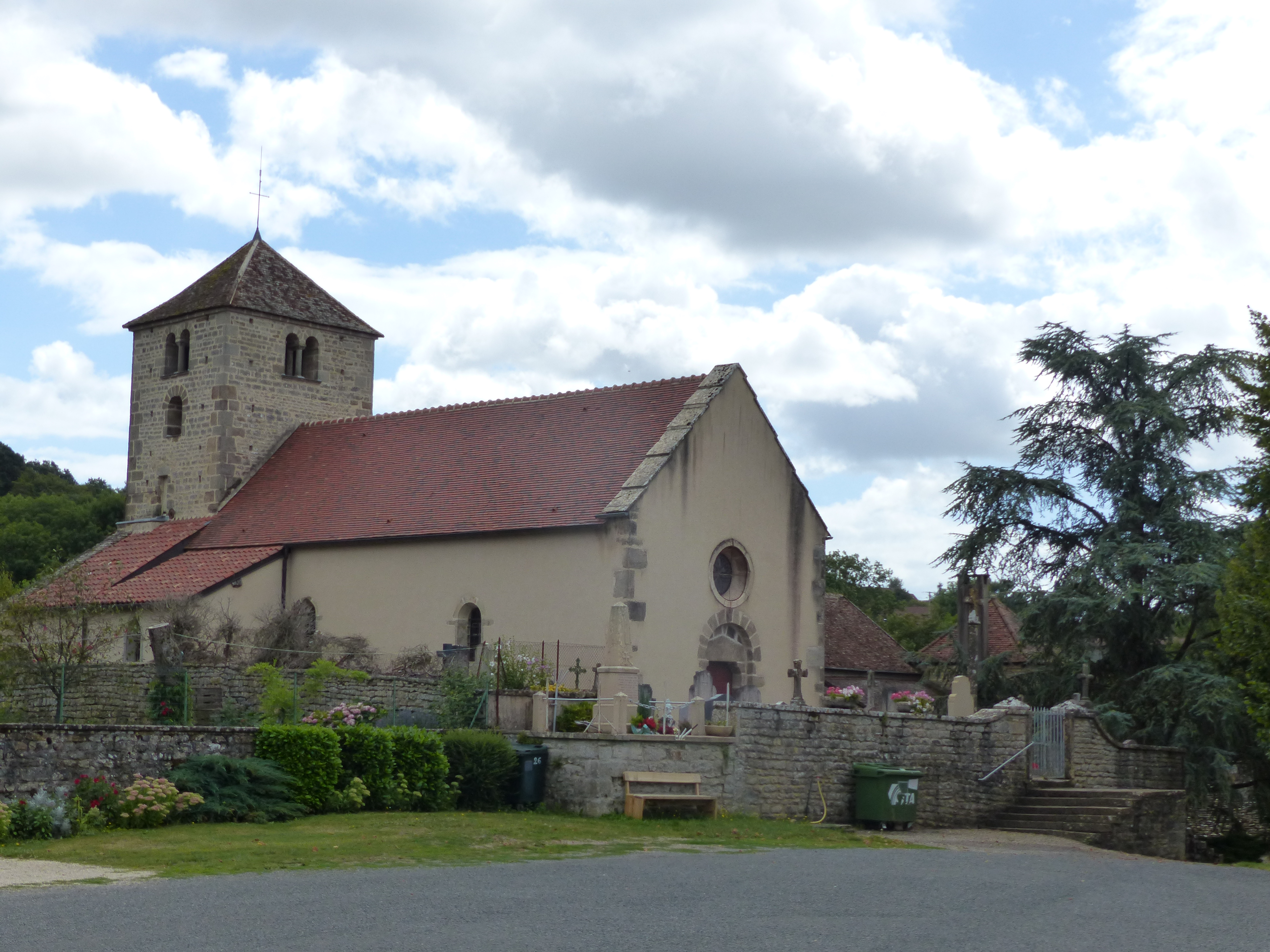
- The church in Burzy

- Coat of arms
- Location of Burzy
- Location within France Location within Bourgogne-Franche-Comté
- Coordinates: 46°35′52″N 4°34′59″E
- Country: France
- Region: Bourgogne-Franche-Comté
- Department: Saône-et-Loire
- Arrondissement: Mâcon
- Canton: Cluny
- Area^{1}: 5.31 km^{2} (2.05 sq mi)
- Elevation: 250 m (820 ft)
- Highest elevation: 373 m (1,224 ft)
- Lowest elevation: 222 m (728 ft)
- Population (2023): 59
  - Density: 11/km^{2} (29/sq mi)
- Time zone: UTC+01:00 (CET)
  - Summer (DST): UTC+02:00 (CEST)
- INSEE/Postal code: 71068 /71460
- ^{1} French Land Register data, which excludes lakes, ponds, glaciers > 1 km^{2} (0.386 sq mi or 247 acres) and river estuaries.

Burzy (French pronunciation: [byʁzi]) is a commune in the Saône-et-Loire department in the region of Bourgogne-Franche-Comté in eastern France.

== See also ==
- Communes of the Saône-et-Loire department
