= Burnand =

- Commune
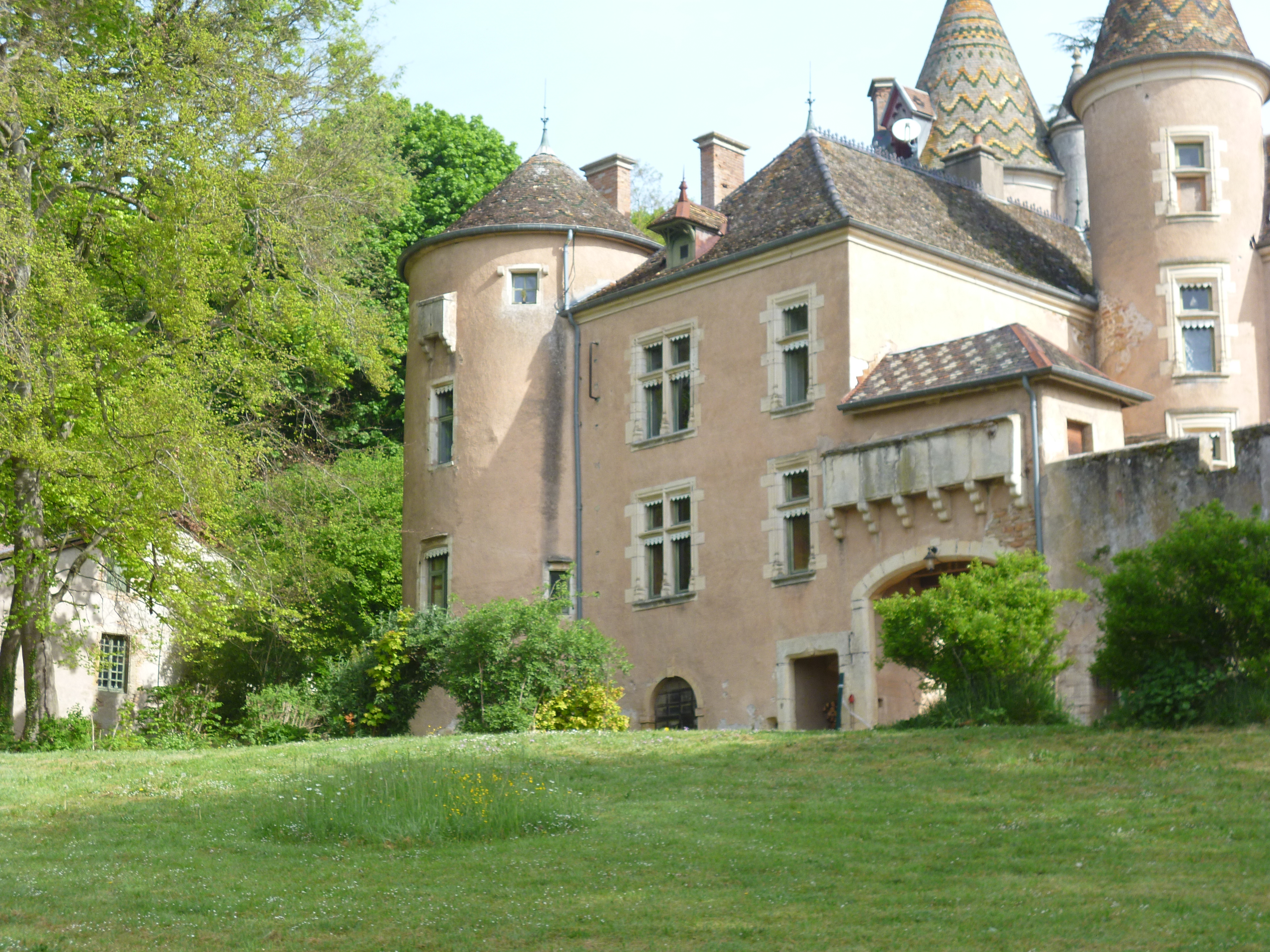
- The chateau in Burnand

- Coat of arms
- Location of Burnand
- Location within France Location within Bourgogne-Franche-Comté
- Coordinates: 46°35′45″N 4°37′52″E
- Country: France
- Region: Bourgogne-Franche-Comté
- Department: Saône-et-Loire
- Arrondissement: Chalon-sur-Saône
- Canton: Cluny
- Intercommunality: Sud Côte Chalonnaise
- Area^{1}: 6.52 km^{2} (2.52 sq mi)
- Elevation: 260 m (850 ft)
- Highest elevation: 403 m (1,322 ft)
- Lowest elevation: 219 m (719 ft)
- Population (2023): 121
  - Density: 18.6/km^{2} (48.1/sq mi)
- Time zone: UTC+01:00 (CET)
  - Summer (DST): UTC+02:00 (CEST)
- INSEE/Postal code: 71067 /71460
- ^{1} French Land Register data, which excludes lakes, ponds, glaciers > 1 km^{2} (0.386 sq mi or 247 acres) and river estuaries.

Burnand (French pronunciation: [byʁnɑ̃]) is a commune in the Saône-et-Loire department in the region of Bourgogne-Franche-Comté in eastern France.

== See also ==
- Communes of the Saône-et-Loire department
