= Curtil-sous-Burnand =

- Commune
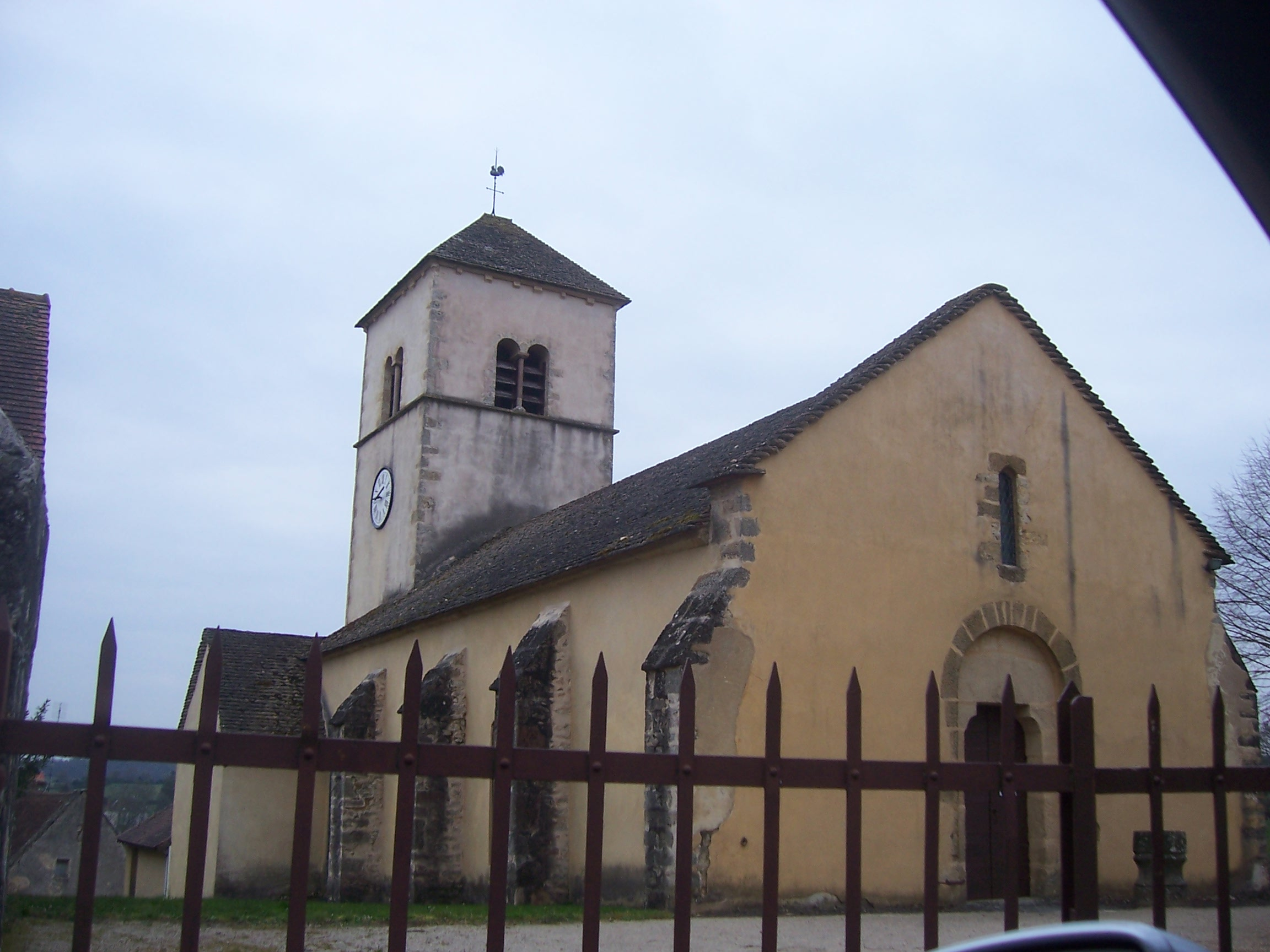
- The church in Curtil-sous-Burnand

- Coat of arms
- Location of Curtil-sous-Burnand
- Location within France Location within Bourgogne-Franche-Comté
- Coordinates: 46°34′59″N 4°38′03″E
- Country: France
- Region: Bourgogne-Franche-Comté
- Department: Saône-et-Loire
- Arrondissement: Chalon-sur-Saône
- Canton: Cluny
- Area^{1}: 8.34 km^{2} (3.22 sq mi)
- Elevation: 260 m (850 ft)
- Highest elevation: 402 m (1,319 ft)
- Lowest elevation: 209 m (686 ft)
- Population (2023): 137
  - Density: 16.4/km^{2} (42.5/sq mi)
- Time zone: UTC+01:00 (CET)
  - Summer (DST): UTC+02:00 (CEST)
- INSEE/Postal code: 71164 /71460
- ^{1} French Land Register data, which excludes lakes, ponds, glaciers > 1 km^{2} (0.386 sq mi or 247 acres) and river estuaries.

Curtil-sous-Burnand is a commune in the Saône-et-Loire department in the region of Bourgogne-Franche-Comté in eastern France.

== See also ==
- Communes of the Saône-et-Loire department
