= Chissey-lès-Mâcon =

Chissey-lès-Macon
- Commune
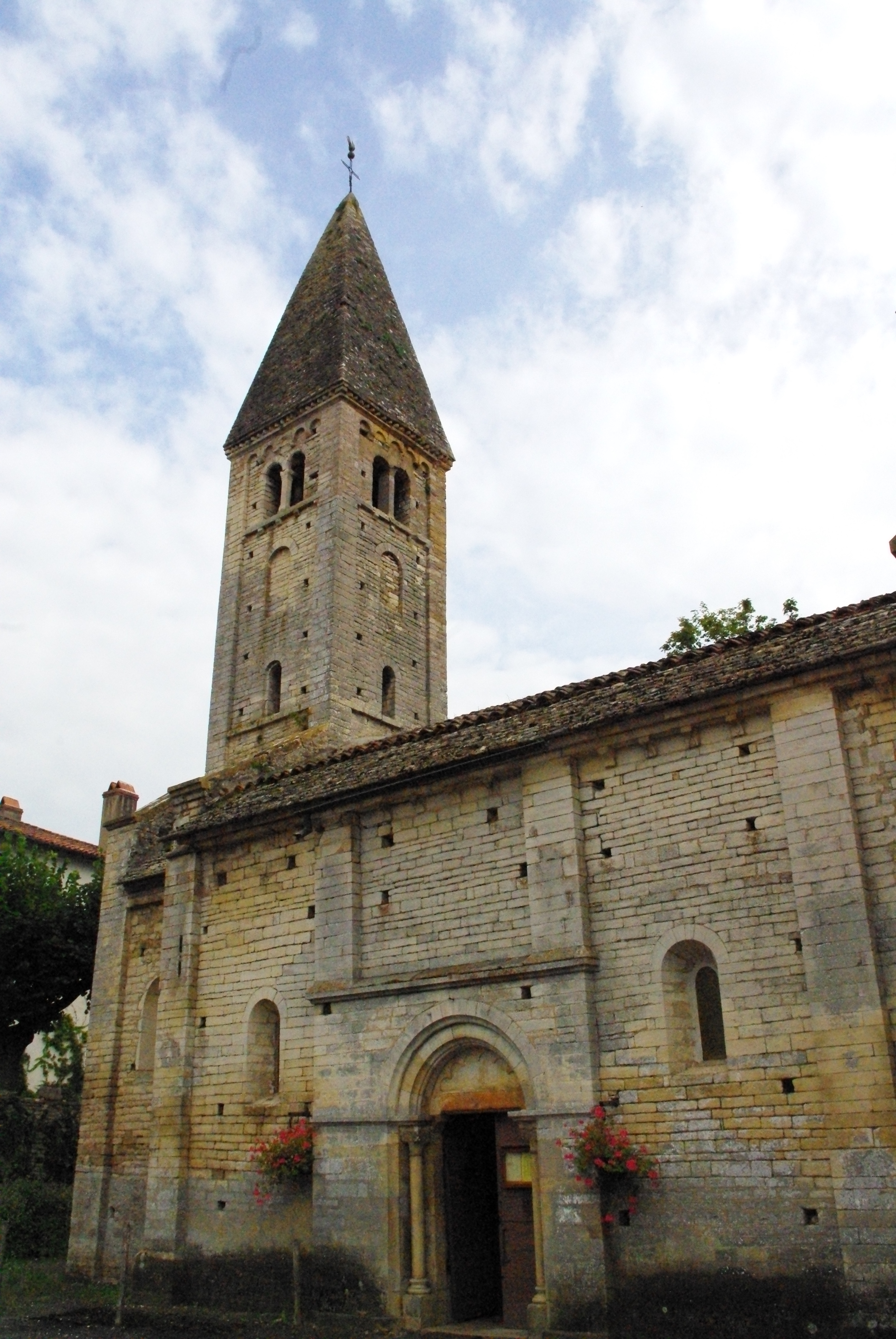
- The church in Chissey-lès-Mâcon

- Coat of arms
- Location of Chissey-lès-Macon
- Location within France Location within Bourgogne-Franche-Comté
- Coordinates: 46°31′34″N 4°44′33″E
- Country: France
- Region: Bourgogne-Franche-Comté
- Department: Saône-et-Loire
- Arrondissement: Mâcon
- Canton: Cluny
- Intercommunality: Clunisois
- Area^{1}: 15.28 km^{2} (5.90 sq mi)
- Elevation: 244 m (801 ft)
- Highest elevation: 551 m (1,808 ft)
- Lowest elevation: 212 m (696 ft)
- Population (2023): 235
  - Density: 15.4/km^{2} (39.8/sq mi)
- Time zone: UTC+01:00 (CET)
  - Summer (DST): UTC+02:00 (CEST)
- INSEE/Postal code: 71130 /71460
- ^{1} French Land Register data, which excludes lakes, ponds, glaciers > 1 km^{2} (0.386 sq mi or 247 acres) and river estuaries.

Chissey-lès-Mâcon (French pronunciation: [ʃisɛ lɛ makɔ̃], literally Chissey near Mâcon) is a commune in the Saône-et-Loire department in the region of Bourgogne-Franche-Comté in eastern France.

== See also ==
- Communes of the Saône-et-Loire department
