= Saint-Huruge =

- Commune
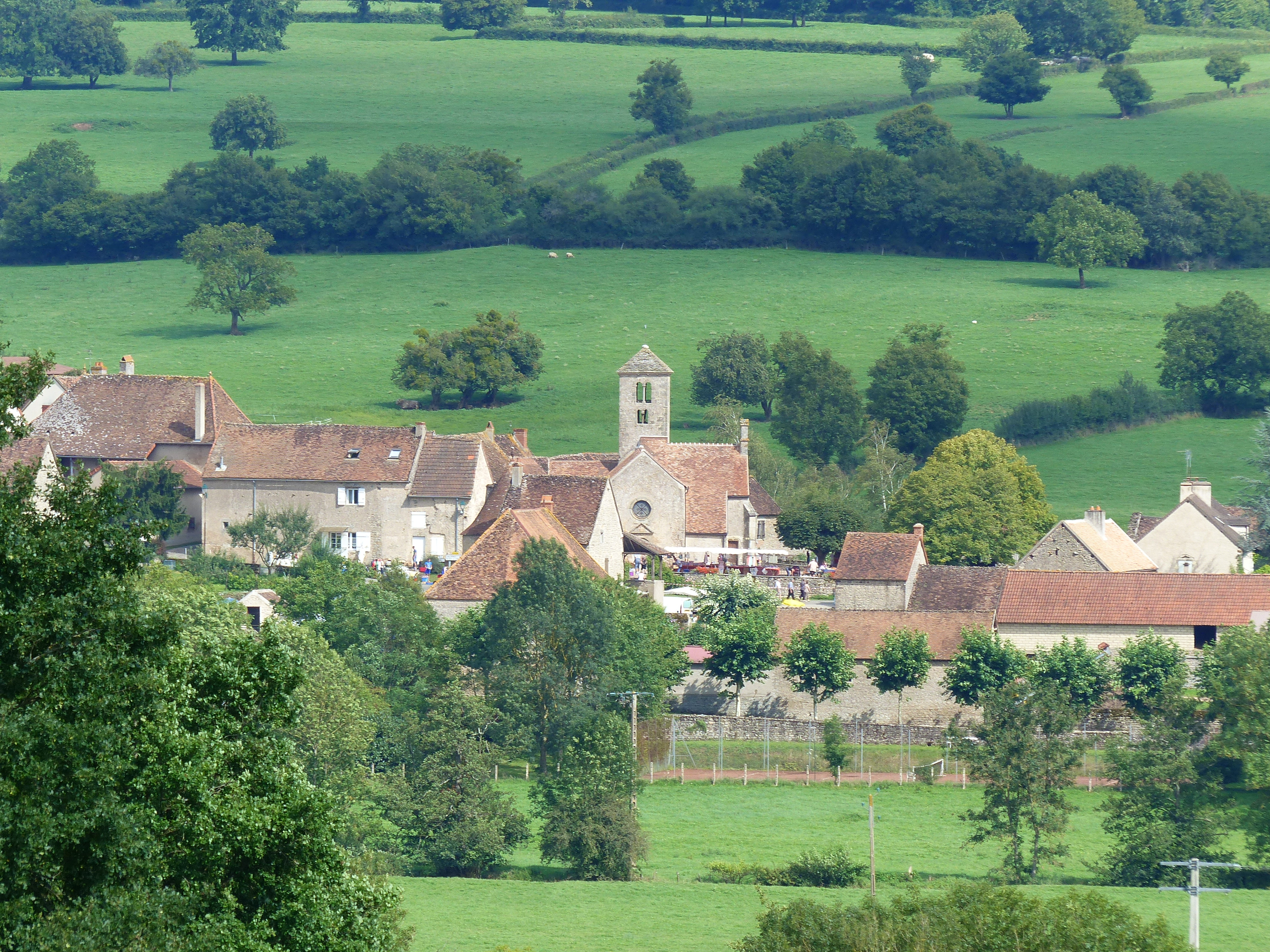
- A general view of Saint-Huruge

- Coat of arms
- Location of Saint-Huruge
- Location within France Location within Bourgogne-Franche-Comté
- Coordinates: 46°34′51″N 4°34′09″E
- Country: France
- Region: Bourgogne-Franche-Comté
- Department: Saône-et-Loire
- Arrondissement: Mâcon
- Canton: Cluny

Government
  - Mayor (2020–2026): Pierre Avenas
- Area^{1}: 4.03 km^{2} (1.56 sq mi)
- Elevation: 220 m (720 ft)
- Highest elevation: 335 m (1,099 ft)
- Lowest elevation: 218 m (715 ft)
- Population (2023): 53
  - Density: 13/km^{2} (34/sq mi)
- Time zone: UTC+01:00 (CET)
  - Summer (DST): UTC+02:00 (CEST)
- INSEE/Postal code: 71427 /71460
- ^{1} French Land Register data, which excludes lakes, ponds, glaciers > 1 km^{2} (0.386 sq mi or 247 acres) and river estuaries.

Saint-Huruge is a commune in the Saône-et-Loire department in the region of Bourgogne-Franche-Comté in eastern France.

== See also ==
- Communes of the Saône-et-Loire department
