= Bissy-sous-Uxelles =

- Commune
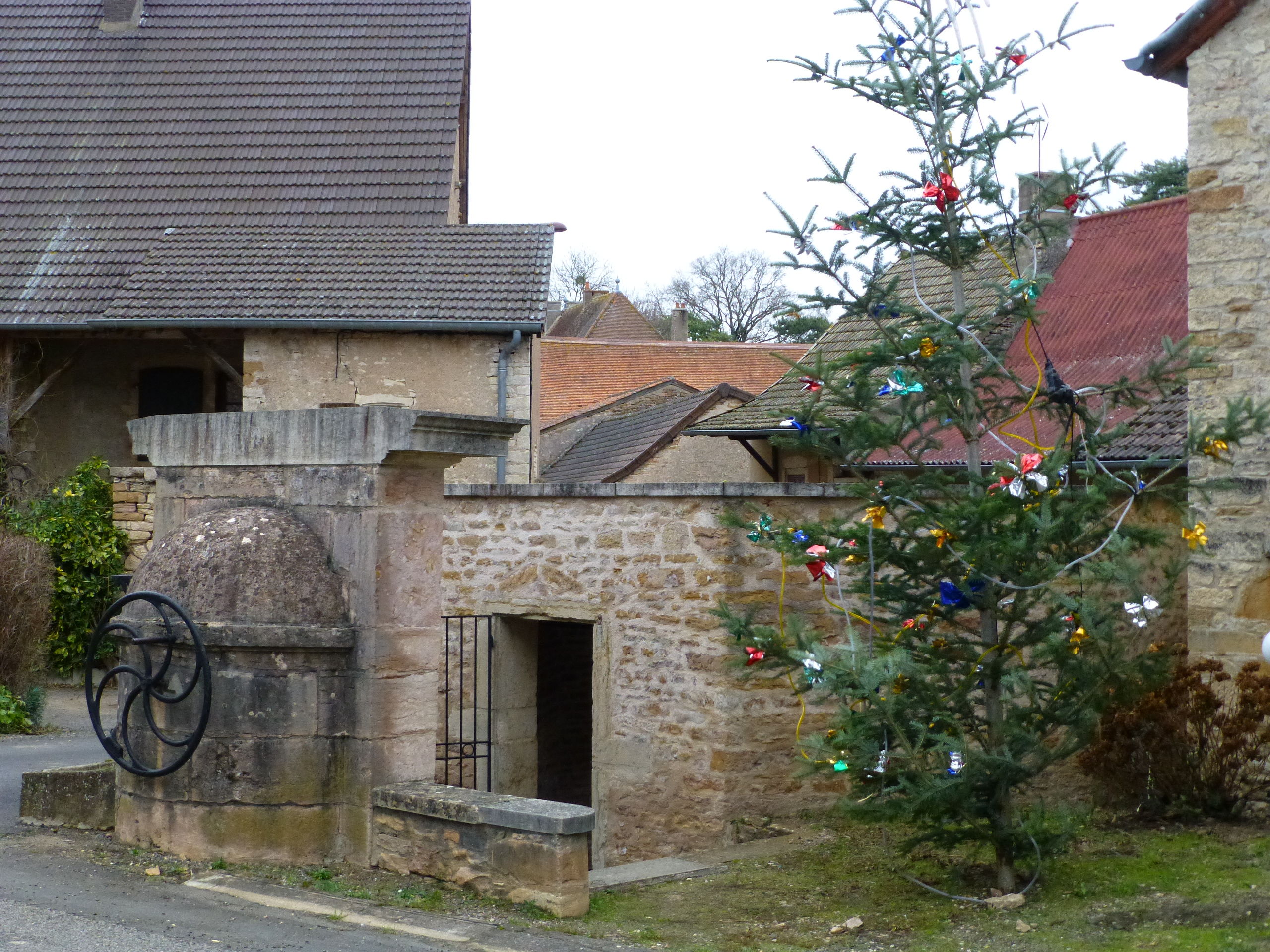
- Wash house
- Location of Bissy-sous-Uxelles
- Location within France Location within Bourgogne-Franche-Comté
- Coordinates: 46°34′10″N 4°43′15″E
- Country: France
- Region: Bourgogne-Franche-Comté
- Department: Saône-et-Loire
- Arrondissement: Chalon-sur-Saône
- Canton: Cluny
- Intercommunality: Entre Grosne et Guye
- Area^{1}: 3.1 km^{2} (1.2 sq mi)
- Elevation: 260 m (850 ft)
- Highest elevation: 287 m (942 ft)
- Lowest elevation: 205 m (673 ft)
- Population (2023): 67
  - Density: 22/km^{2} (56/sq mi)
- Time zone: UTC+01:00 (CET)
  - Summer (DST): UTC+02:00 (CEST)
- INSEE/Postal code: 71036 /71460
- ^{1} French Land Register data, which excludes lakes, ponds, glaciers > 1 km^{2} (0.386 sq mi or 247 acres) and river estuaries.

Bissy-sous-Uxelles is a commune in the Saône-et-Loire department in the region of Bourgogne-Franche-Comté in eastern France.

== Population ==
Historical population
Year	Pop.	±% p.a.
1968	113	—
1975	79	−4.98%
1982	71	−1.51%
1990	62	−1.68%
1999	59	−0.55%
2007	70	+2.16%
2012	71	+0.28%
2017	68	−0.86%
2023	67	−0.25%
Source: INSEE

== See also ==
- Communes of the Saône-et-Loire department
