= Ameugny =

- Commune
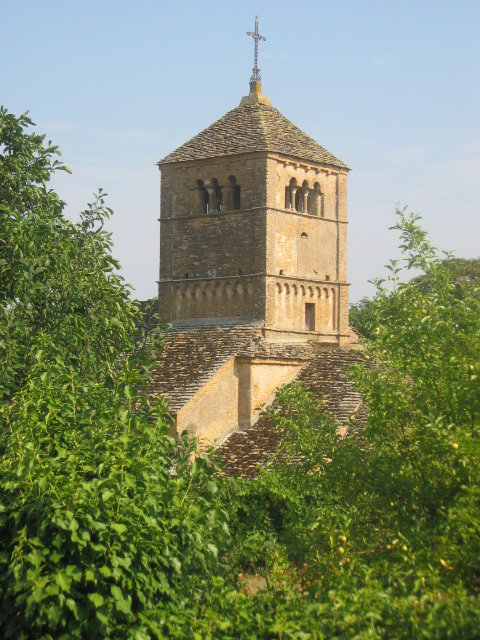

- Coat of arms
- Location of Ameugny
- Location within France Location within Bourgogne-Franche-Comté
- Coordinates: 46°31′36″N 4°40′44″E
- Country: France
- Region: Bourgogne-Franche-Comté
- Department: Saône-et-Loire
- Arrondissement: Mâcon
- Canton: Cluny
- Intercommunality: Le Clunisois

Government
  - Mayor (2020–2026): Virginie Logerot
- Area^{1}: 6.47 km^{2} (2.50 sq mi)
- Elevation: 216 m (709 ft)
- Highest elevation: 280 m (920 ft)
- Lowest elevation: 205 m (673 ft)
- Population (2023): 169
  - Density: 26.1/km^{2} (67.7/sq mi)
- Time zone: UTC+01:00 (CET)
  - Summer (DST): UTC+02:00 (CEST)
- INSEE/Postal code: 71007 /71460
- ^{1} French Land Register data, which excludes lakes, ponds, glaciers > 1 km^{2} (0.386 sq mi or 247 acres) and river estuaries.

Ameugny (French pronunciation: [amœɲi]) is a commune in the Saône-et-Loire department in the Bourgogne-Franche-Comté region in eastern France.

== Geography ==
The commune lies in the south of the department. The river Grosne flows through the commune.

== Population ==
Historical population
| Year | Pop. | ±% p.a. |
|---|---|---|
| 1968 | 148 | — |
| 1975 | 122 | −2.72% |
| 1982 | 148 | +2.80% |
| 1990 | 143 | −0.43% |
| 1999 | 156 | +0.97% |
| 2007 | 135 | −1.79% |
| 2012 | 153 | +2.53% |
| 2017 | 172 | +2.37% |
| 2023 | 169 | −0.29% |
Source: INSEE

== See also ==
- Communes of the Saône-et-Loire department
