= Chapaize =

- Commune
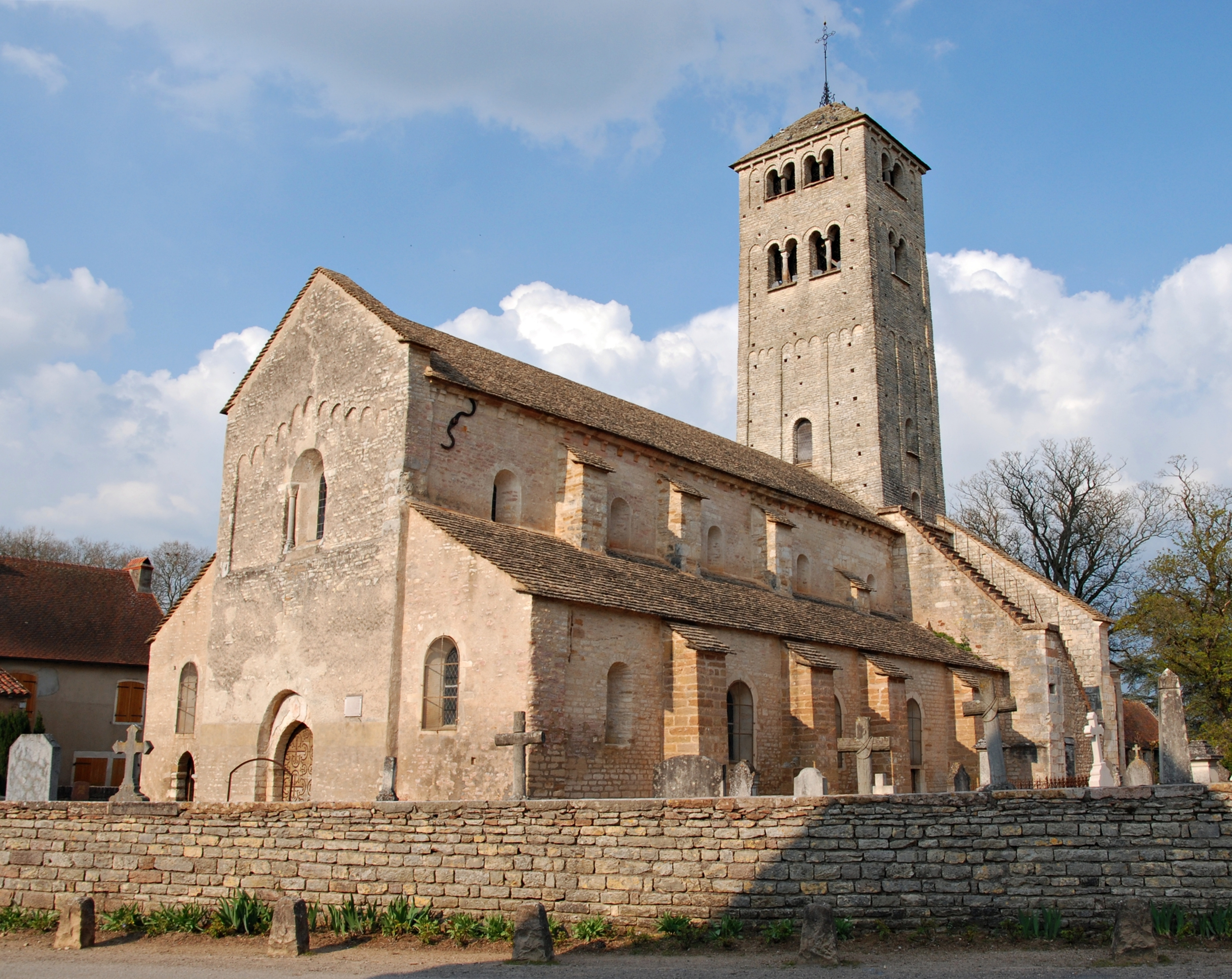

- Coat of arms
- Location of Chapaize
- Location within France Location within Bourgogne-Franche-Comté
- Coordinates: 46°33′29″N 4°44′17″E
- Country: France
- Region: Bourgogne-Franche-Comté
- Department: Saône-et-Loire
- Arrondissement: Chalon-sur-Saône
- Canton: Cluny

Government
  - Mayor (2020–2026): J Michel Cognard
- Area^{1}: 13.76 km^{2} (5.31 sq mi)
- Elevation: 200 m (660 ft)
- Highest elevation: 315 m (1,033 ft)
- Lowest elevation: 203 m (666 ft)
- Population (2023): 167
  - Density: 12.1/km^{2} (31.4/sq mi)
- Time zone: UTC+01:00 (CET)
  - Summer (DST): UTC+02:00 (CEST)
- INSEE/Postal code: 71087 /71460
- ^{1} French Land Register data, which excludes lakes, ponds, glaciers > 1 km^{2} (0.386 sq mi or 247 acres) and river estuaries.

Chapaize (French pronunciation: [ʃapɛz]) is a commune in the Saône-et-Loire department in the Bourgogne-Franche-Comté region in eastern France.

== Sights ==
It features a Romanesque church built in the 11th century, in lombard style, surrounded by stone-built houses with the typical covered galleries of this region with a 16th-century watch tower. In the hamlet of Lancharre, there is a church of the 12th century, remains of a canonnesse's monastery.

Around Chapaize lie a large state and communal forest and two ponds. In the four hamlets of Chapaize (Bessuge, Gemaugue, Lancharre, and Chapaize), there are several laundrettes which were still used at the beginning of the 1950s.

== See also ==
- Communes of the Saône-et-Loire department
