= Passy, Saône-et-Loire =

Passy
- Commune
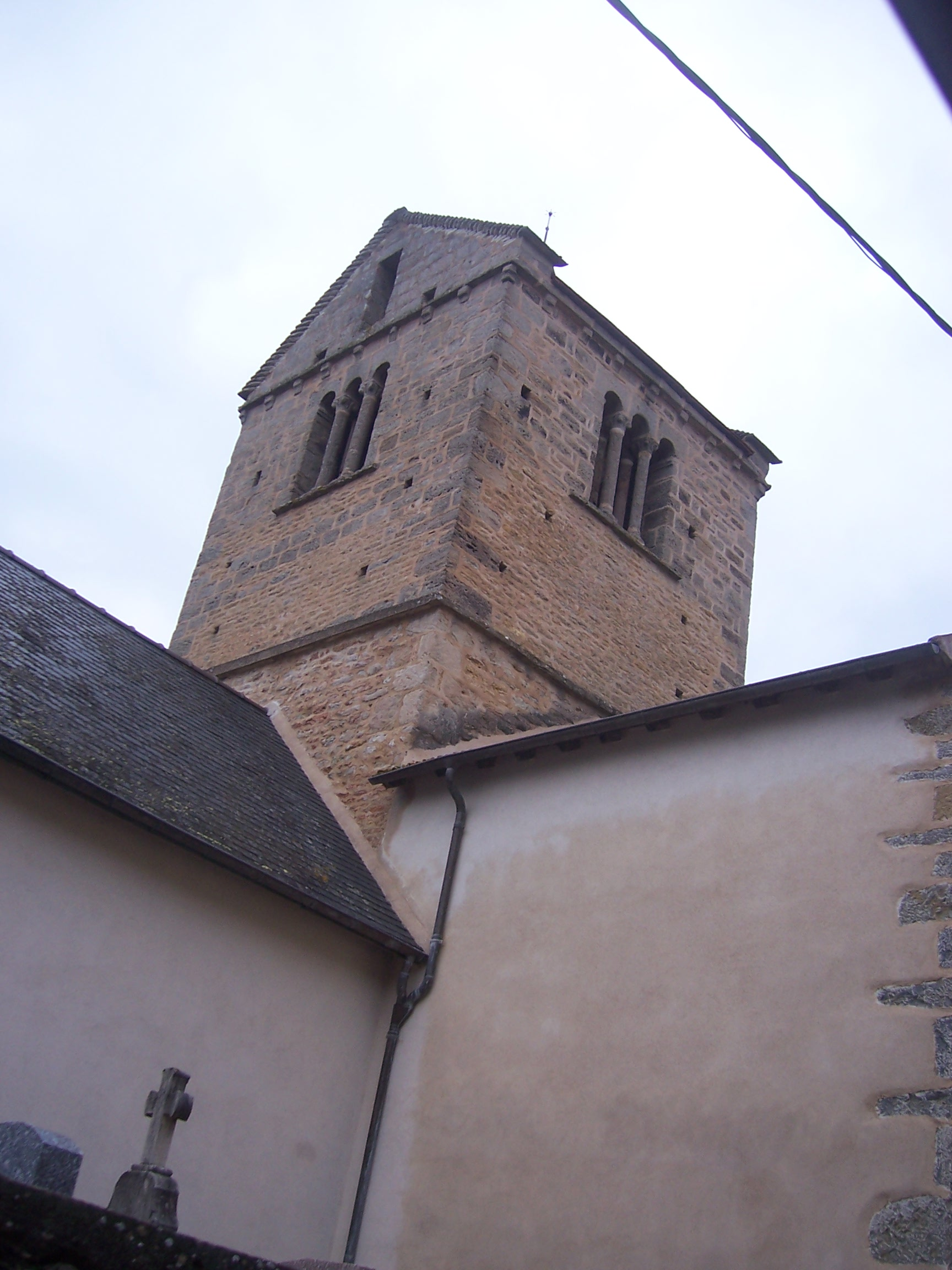
- The church in Passy

- Coat of arms
- Location of Passy
- Location within France Location within Bourgogne-Franche-Comté
- Coordinates: 46°32′30″N 4°32′09″E
- Country: France
- Region: Bourgogne-Franche-Comté
- Department: Saône-et-Loire
- Arrondissement: Mâcon
- Canton: Cluny
- Area^{1}: 4.36 km^{2} (1.68 sq mi)
- Elevation: 240 m (790 ft)
- Highest elevation: 382 m (1,253 ft)
- Lowest elevation: 227 m (745 ft)
- Population (2023): 70
  - Density: 16/km^{2} (42/sq mi)
- Time zone: UTC+01:00 (CET)
  - Summer (DST): UTC+02:00 (CEST)
- INSEE/Postal code: 71344 /71220
- ^{1} French Land Register data, which excludes lakes, ponds, glaciers > 1 km^{2} (0.386 sq mi or 247 acres) and river estuaries.

Passy (French pronunciation: [pasi]) is a commune in the Saône-et-Loire department in the region of Bourgogne-Franche-Comté in eastern France.

== See also ==
- Communes of the Saône-et-Loire department
