= Saint-Vincent-des-Prés, Saône-et-Loire =

Saint-Vincent-des-Prés
- Commune
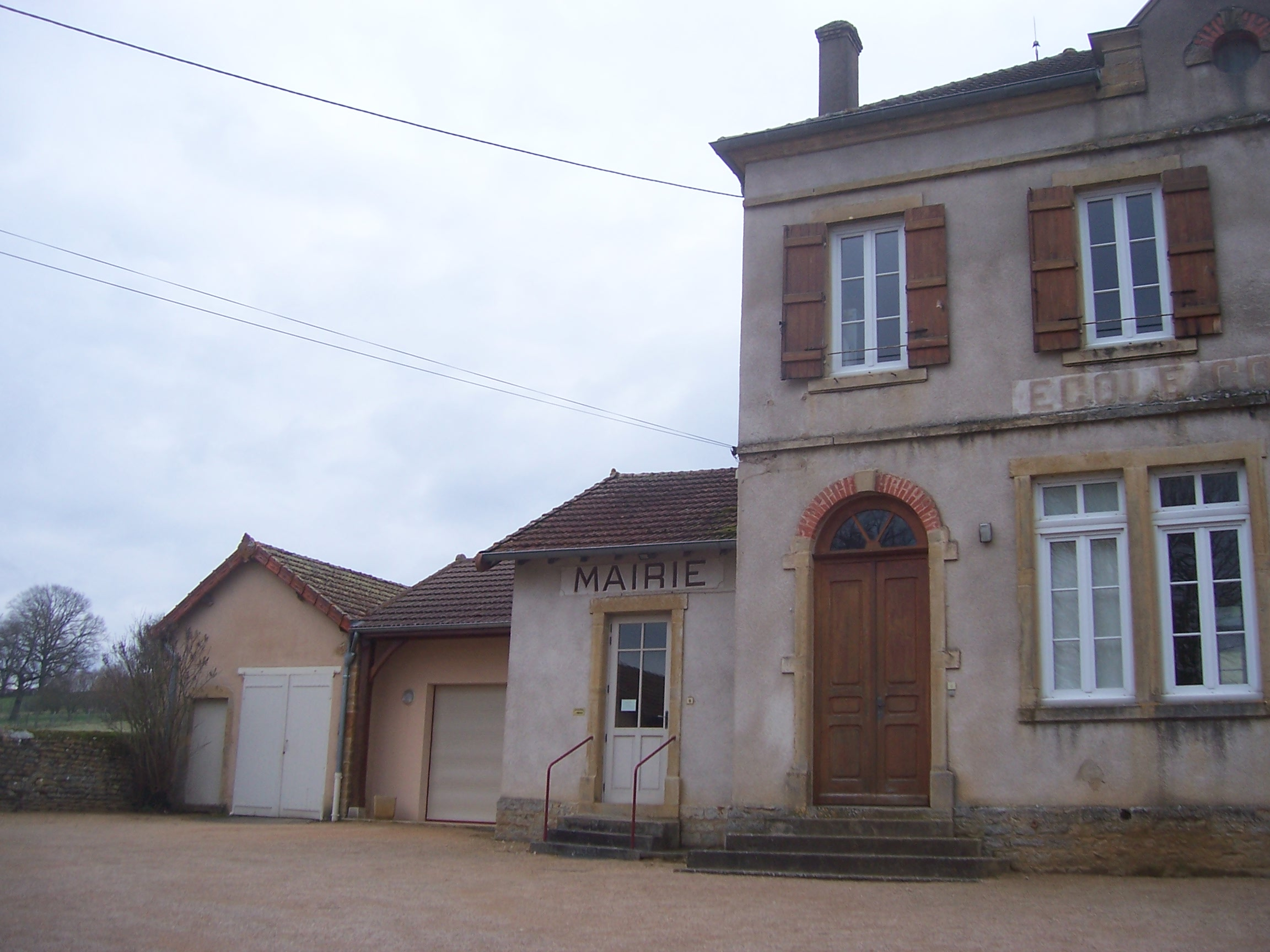
- The town hall in Saint-Vincent-des-Prés
- Location of Saint-Vincent-des-Prés
- Location within France Location within Bourgogne-Franche-Comté
- Coordinates: 46°28′31″N 4°33′48″E
- Country: France
- Region: Bourgogne-Franche-Comté
- Department: Saône-et-Loire
- Arrondissement: Mâcon
- Canton: Cluny
- Area^{1}: 6.3 km^{2} (2.4 sq mi)
- Elevation: 250 m (820 ft)
- Highest elevation: 356 m (1,168 ft)
- Lowest elevation: 223 m (732 ft)
- Population (2023): 96
  - Density: 15/km^{2} (39/sq mi)
- Time zone: UTC+01:00 (CET)
  - Summer (DST): UTC+02:00 (CEST)
- INSEE/Postal code: 71488 /71250
- ^{1} French Land Register data, which excludes lakes, ponds, glaciers > 1 km^{2} (0.386 sq mi or 247 acres) and river estuaries.

Saint-Vincent-des-Prés (French pronunciation: [sɛ̃ vɛ̃sɑ̃ de pʁe]) is a commune in the Saône-et-Loire department in the region of Bourgogne-Franche-Comté in eastern France.

== See also ==
- Communes of the Saône-et-Loire department
