= Canton of Cluny =

Coordinates: 46.43°N 4.66°E

The canton of Cluny is an administrative division of the Saône-et-Loire department, eastern France. Its borders were modified at the French canton reorganisation which came into effect in March 2015. Its seat is in Cluny.

It consists of the following communes:

1. Ameugny
2. Bergesserin
3. Berzé-le-Châtel
4. Bissy-sous-Uxelles
5. Blanot
6. Bonnay-Saint-Ythaire
7. Bray
8. Buffières
9. Burnand
10. Burzy
11. Chapaize
12. Château
13. Chérizet
14. Chevagny-sur-Guye
15. Chiddes
16. Chissey-lès-Mâcon
17. Cluny
18. Cormatin
19. Cortambert
20. Cortevaix
21. Curtil-sous-Buffières
22. Curtil-sous-Burnand
23. Donzy-le-Pertuis
24. Flagy
25. La Guiche
26. Jalogny
27. Lournand
28. Malay
29. Massilly
30. Mazille
31. Passy
32. Pressy-sous-Dondin
33. Sailly
34. Saint-André-le-Désert
35. Saint-Clément-sur-Guye
36. Sainte-Cécile
37. Saint-Gengoux-le-National
38. Saint-Huruge
39. Saint-Marcelin-de-Cray
40. Saint-Martin-de-Salencey
41. Saint-Vincent-des-Prés
42. Salornay-sur-Guye
43. Savigny-sur-Grosne
44. Sigy-le-Châtel
45. Sivignon
46. Taizé
47. Vaux-en-Pré
48. La Vineuse sur Fregande
