= Sailly, Saône-et-Loire =

Sailly
- Commune
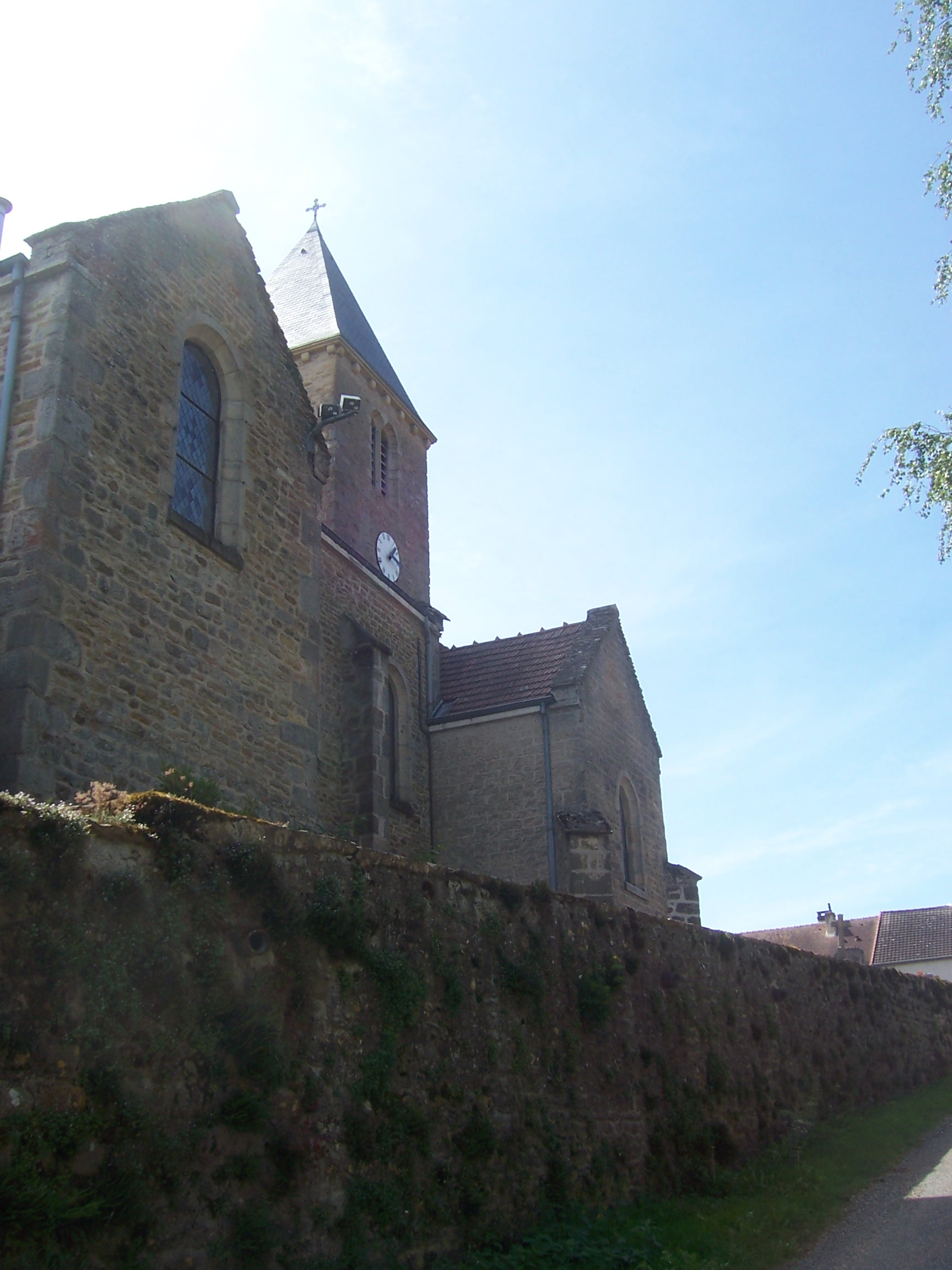
- The church in Sailly

- Coat of arms
- Location of Sailly
- Location within France Location within Bourgogne-Franche-Comté
- Coordinates: 46°32′13″N 4°34′02″E
- Country: France
- Region: Bourgogne-Franche-Comté
- Department: Saône-et-Loire
- Arrondissement: Mâcon
- Canton: Cluny

Government
  - Mayor (2020–2026): Patrick Givry
- Area^{1}: 8.96 km^{2} (3.46 sq mi)
- Elevation: 225 m (738 ft)
- Highest elevation: 392 m (1,286 ft)
- Lowest elevation: 212 m (696 ft)
- Population (2023): 75
  - Density: 8.4/km^{2} (22/sq mi)
- Time zone: UTC+01:00 (CET)
  - Summer (DST): UTC+02:00 (CEST)
- INSEE/Postal code: 71381 /71250
- ^{1} French Land Register data, which excludes lakes, ponds, glaciers > 1 km^{2} (0.386 sq mi or 247 acres) and river estuaries.

Sailly (French pronunciation: [saji]) is a commune in the Saône-et-Loire department in the region of Bourgogne-Franche-Comté in eastern France.

== See also ==
- Communes of the Saône-et-Loire department
