= Marie Guillot =

French trade unionist and anarcho-syndicalist

- Marie Guillot
- Born: 9 September 1880; Damerey, Saône-et-Loire, France
- Died: 5 March 1934 (aged 53); Lyon, France
- Occupation: Teacher
- Known for: Women's rights activism

Marie Guillot (9 September 1880, Damerey – 5 March 1934) was a teacher in Saône-et-Loire and a pioneer of trade unionism in primary education. She associated the social emancipation that syndicalism would bring with the empowerment of women. An anarcho-syndicalist, she was a member of the national leadership of the Confédération générale du travail unitaire (CGTU – General Confederation of Trade Unions) in 1922–1923. She was active in the struggle of the anarchists, who believed in a decentralized or federal organization of workers' syndicates, against the communists who believed in a central organization.

== Early years ==
Marie Guillot was born in September 1880 at Damerey, in the Bresse region of the department of Saône-et-Loire, where her family was rooted. For the rest of her life Marie Guillot kept strong ties to this area of southern Burgundy. Her father, an agricultural day laborer, died when she was only three years old. To feed Marie and her sister, her mother left the Bresse countryside to work in the nearest town, Chalon-sur-Saône, where she found employment as a daily washerwoman. Marie was a good student at school, instructed by a lay teacher. She gained the Brevet supérieur, the qualification needed for minor public service.

In 1899 Marie Guillot became a primary school teacher, and was able to support her mother. After several years as a substitute teacher, and positions in schools in Mâcon, the Autun region and Bresse, she gained tenure in a school in a small village in the Côte Chalonnaise. (Note: The village of Saint-Martin-d'Auxy had 160 people before World War I.) She taught from 1904 to 1921. She remained single, sharing her energies between teaching and trade union activities. Around 1910 she founded the Saône-et-Loire section of the Fédération des syndicats d'instituteurs (Federation of teachers unions), and assumed the secretariat in a hostile administrative environment. (Note: The "Radical Republic" of Georges Clemenceau, Aristide Briand, Louis Barthou and René Viviani united radical socialists, radical republicans and independent socialists in a denying the right of civil servants to form unions.)

== Unionism ==
The harsh life of Guillot's parents, her own living conditions, (Note: Teachers were poorly treated, and in rural areas the financial contribution of the town hall secretariat was an indispensable supplement) and harassment by the administrative hierarchy convinced her of the need for unions. These factors also made her an adherent of the Socialist Party, probably under the influence of another teacher from Saône-et-Loire, Théo Bretin. She agreed with the anarcho-syndicalists that future society would be organized into syndicates. She was among the subscribers to the small journal La Vie ouvrière (Worker's Life) published by the Confédération générale du travail (CGT: General confederation of labor). In 1913 she began a long-lasting correspondence with Pierre Monatte, the editor. Some of her letters were published by Colette Chambelland and Jean Maitron in Syndicalisme révolutionnaire et Communisme. In July 1913 La Vie ouvrière published an article signed "Marie Guillot". She wrote as an experienced activist.

The CGT journal let Marie Guillot speak in its January 1913 issue under the transparent pseudonym "a subscriber from Saône-et-Loire." She noted in a clear and direct style: "You are aware the lack of women in La Vie ouvrière! Do you therefore expect to make a revolution or economic transformation without women? (...) Do you feel disdain for us? That would be very misguided. The feminist movement penetrates the masses more and more, and must be reckoned with."

== Feminism ==
From 1910 Guillot participated in drafting and disseminating L'École émancipée (The emancipated school), a weekly educational magazine published by the National Federation of Unions of male and female teachers of France and the colonies. Four of her articles, written alone or with others, were published by this journal in 1911; five were published in 1912; six in 1913; seven between January and July 1914. (Note: The first issue of L'École émancipée appeared in October 1910. Madeleine Guilbert lists all the articles written by women in the socialist and trade union press.) From April 1912 she took the pen name for this review of Tribune féministe.

Marie Guillot saw the struggle by women for equality as having the same importance as her political and union engagements. From 1906 she directed the Association of Women of Saône-et-Loire to spread secularist ideas. She used the weekly The Saône-et-Loire Socialist to disseminate feminist demands. L'École émancipée also allowed her to popularize her ideas, particularly over the difference between salary, rank and seniority between men and women in the educational system. (Note: In 1912 the difference in pay between male and female teachers was 300 francs.)

== Pacifism ==
After the outbreak of World War I (July 1914 – November 1918) the leaders of the Section française de l'Internationale ouvrière (SFIO: French section of the workers' international) and the CGT aligned with the militarism of the government, and the most committed syndicalists forgot the anti-war orders-of-day they had defended in Congress. In August 1914 Marie Guillot wrote to Pierre Monatte: "What frightens me more than all the carnage is the wave of hatred that always rises higher, and deflects the energy of the workers from their goal.

During the years of conflict Guillot continued in the same stubborn way to express pacifist ideas wherever she could. She was comforted by Romain Rolland's Au-dessus de la mêlée (Above the fray – September 1914), by the attitude of Pierre Monatte with whom she corresponded throughout the war, and by the pronouncements of other teachers for peace. She was questioned several times but was not arrested during the war.

== National-level union leader ==
After the war Marie Guillot was active in union work. From 7 to 10 August 1919 she participated in Tours in the Congress of the National Federation of teachers unions. From 15 to 21 September 1919, she participated in the 14th Congress of the CGT in Lyon, where she was among the "revolutionary" minority of syndicalists. In January 1920, she was elected Secretary General of the Committee of revolutionary syndicalists of Education. In August of the same year she participated at Bordeaux in the fourteenth congress of the Federation of teachers' unions.

Marie Guillot was one of 350 delegates representing 12,000 members divided into 68 unions. However, the right to organize was still denied to civil servants, including teachers. The secretary of the federation, Louis Bouët, lost his job on July 31. This was the third time in the history of the young teachers unionism that a federal secretary was revoked. (Note: In 1907 Marius Nègre was dismissed along with the leaders of postal unions. In 1918 the teacher Hélène Brion was dismissed for her pacifist action) During the years 1919–1921, several education trade unionists also underwent investigation and sanction. Marie Guillot, leader of the revolutionary syndicalist committee of Saône-et-Loire was brought before a disciplinary council in January 1921. She was dismissed on 25 April 1921 on the grounds that "acts of revolutionary propaganda carried out by Mlle Marie Guillot are incompatible with the functions of a public teacher."

For good measure, the school of Saint-Martin-d'Auxy, emptied of its students by demographic decline and local intrigues, was closed. Guillot's friends from La Vie ouvrière provided editorial work to those who found themselves without pay. A solidarity subscription collected the equivalent of eight months of her teacher's salary. She donated a large part to her union to cover the cost of legal action. But her activism increased in her free time. In July 1921, the departmental CGT of Saône-et-Loire elected her Secretary General. The balance of power between the majority proponents of confederation and the revolutionary minority reversed for the first time in the department. Marie Guillot was elected by 24 votes against 19 for the outgoing secretary Jean-Marie Thomas, also a teacher, and the future socialist deputy of Chalon-sur-Saône between 1928 and 1940.

== General Secretary of the Federation of Education ==
The 16th Congress of the CGT was held from 25 to 30 July 1921 in Lille. Marie Guillot was among the delegates who voted for the motions of the revolutionary syndicalists. In the minority, they began to increase significantly in numbers. In September 1920 the 15th Congress in Orléans was distributed between 1,505 voice for the supporters of Léon Jouhaux and 552 votes for the revolutionaries. Less than a year later the guidance document was approved by 1,572 votes against 1,325, with 66 abstentions. This growth augured a change to the majority in the next Congress.

At the 15th Congress of the Federation of secular education, held in Paris from 18 to 20 August 1921, Marie Guillot was elected Secretary General. This was the first time a woman was elected Secretary General of a CGT Federation. She was elected at a key moment for French syndicalism, when Léon Jouhaux's administrative measures of exclusion were being enacted. (Note: The biographers of the secretary general of the CGT note that the exclusion decisions resulted from a desire to overcome the paralysis of endless debates.) The exclusion applied to the revolutionary syndicalists. Some of the minority leaders wanted to split to create a new organization that was not subject to reformism or to Moscow's leadership. Although a leader of the revolutionary syndicalists, Marie Guillot's position was not clear. On 23–25 December 1921, in Paris, the "minority" syndicalists organized a meeting of excluded organizations and of minorities in the other organizations. Guillot was not among the provisional leadership of the union structure that implemented the CGTU, dominated by the anarchists.

== National secretary of the CGTU ==
In the first half of 1922 Marie Guillot was dedicated to implementing the new "unitary" confederation. The first confederal Congress was at St Etienne at the end of June 1922. The debate focused on accession to the Internationale syndicale rouge (ISR: Red International of Labor Unions), and on the greater or lesser degree of autonomy related to this organization. Marie Guillot, as with the postman Joseph Lartigue, took an intermediate position in the continuum of revolutionary syndicalism, while recognizing the merits of the Soviet Revolution. They constituted a pivotal group. They advocated conditional accession to the ISR.

Initially unplanned, Marie Guillot owed her appointment to the confederal Bureau of the CGTU to the withdrawal of her colleague Louis Bouët. This was the first time a woman was part of the Confederation Office, according to the L'Humanité. The Congress of the Federation of Education that had adhered to the CGTU under Marie Guillot was held in Paris from 17 to 19 August. It ratified accession to the ISR with 139 votes for, 12 against and 8 abstention. The cohabitation of revolutionary syndicalists with supporters of unconditional international centralism did not last long. After resigning from their responsibilities within the CGTU in July 1923, Marie Guillot and her comrades arranged an Extraordinary Congress in Bourges in November 1923. Removed from the Central Women's Commission, which she had organized, she decided with her running mates to leave the leadership of the CGTU.

In June 1924, Marie Guillot was reinstated as a teacher. She returned to Saône-et-Loire, unionism, the schoolhouse and the life of the feminist union groups. The CGTU federation of Education was "normalized" between 1929 and 1931. This plunged her into despair. With failing physical and mental health she was admitted to a Lyon hospital, where she died on 5 March 1934 at the age of 54.
