= Théo Bretin =

French politician (1879–1956)

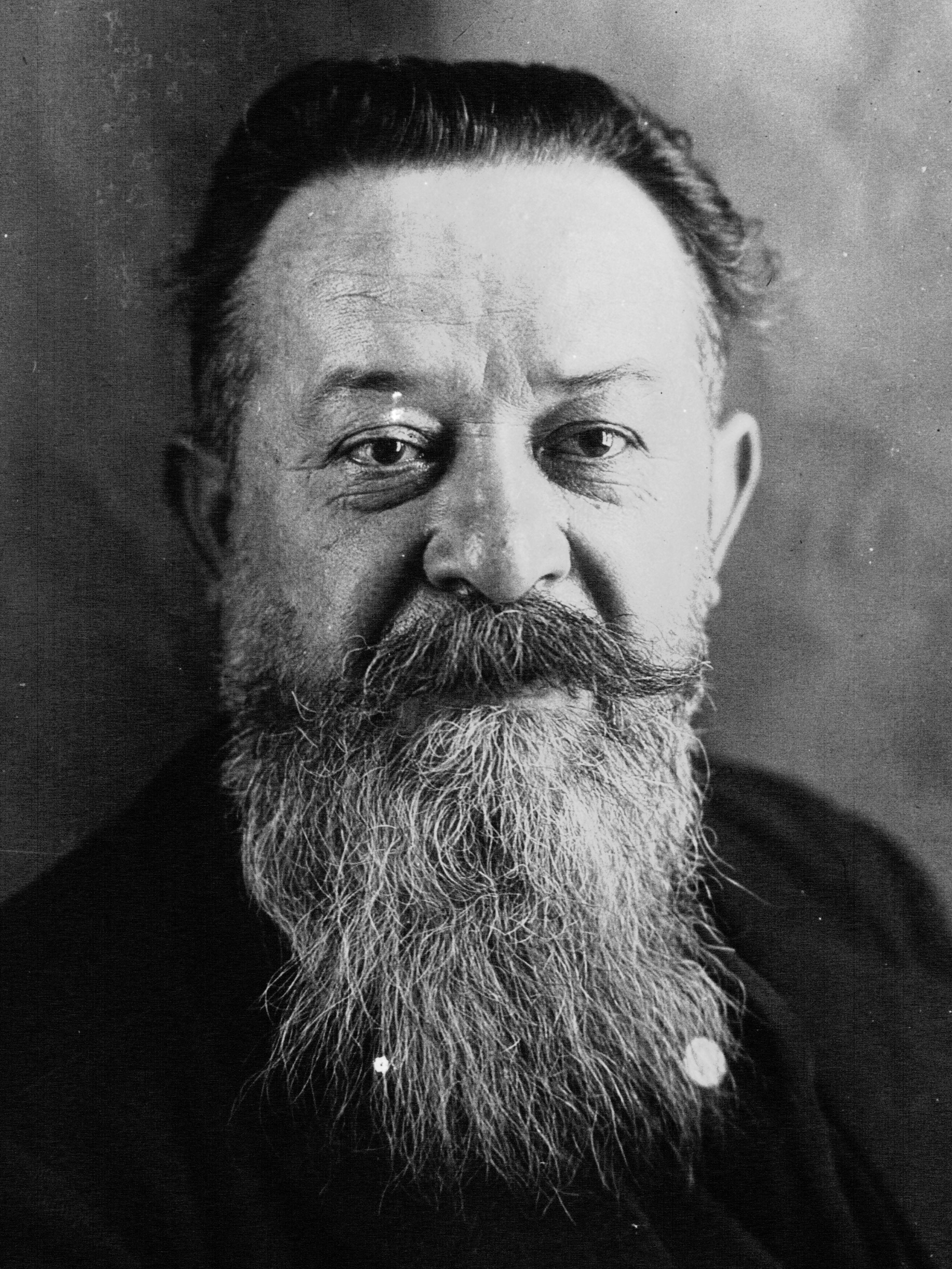
- Théo Bretin in 1932
- Born: Louis Bretin; 11 January 1879; Saint-Gengoux-le-National, Saône-et-Loire, France
- Died: 12 July 1956 (aged 77); Chagny, Saône-et-Loire, France
- Occupation: Teacher
- Known for: Deputy for Saône-et-Loire

Théo Bretin (born Louis Bretin, 11 January 1879 – 12 July 1956) was a French teacher and socialist politician who was deputy for Saône-et-Loire from 1914 to 1919 and again from 1924 to 1928.

== Early years ==
Louis Bretin was born on 11 January 1879 in Saint-Gengoux-le-National, Saône-et-Loire). He attended the Ecole normale primaire in Mâcon, and qualified as a teacher. He joined the Section française de l'Internationale ouvrière (SFIO: French section of the workers' international), and in 1899 founded the socialist group of the Épinac mining center. He used the pseudonym "A. Théo", which sounds in French like "atheist".

Bretin was secretary-general of the Jeunesses Laïques de Chalon (Secular youths of Chalon) in 1904, and the next year was elected deputy secretary general of the socialist federation. In 1905 at a conference on working class action in the event of war he was censured for "unpatriotic proposals." He probably influenced Marie Guillot, another teacher from Saône-et-Loire, to become a socialist. She went on to become prominent in the syndicalist movement.

In 1908 Bretin and Guillot were among those involved in organizing a section of the teachers' federation in Saône-et-Loire. On 7 November 1905 the government had made it clear that it was illegal to form a teachers' union. Guillot was brought before the school inspector on 29 May 1908, and Theo Bretin on 1 June 1908. They used different lines of defense: Guillot said she had the right to form a section of a federation which was, if not legal, at least tolerated. Bretin said that the section was not a union, and the proof was that it had not filed statutes. Both, however, were forced to dissociate themselves from the federation to avoid sanctions.

Bretin became a councilor and then mayor of Chagny, Saône-et-Loire.

== Deputy ==
In the general elections of 26 April and 10 May 1914 Bretin was elected in the second round of voting for the second district of Chalon-sur-Saône. He was an outspoken supporter of a radical reform of the tax system, education reform and the establishment of the United States of Europe. He joined the Socialist Group, and was a member of the Commissions of education and fine arts, tax legislation, the merchant navy, economic reorganization and the army. When World War I (July 1914 – November 1918) began he was drafted into the 59th Territorial Infantry. He was promoted to lieutenant and transferred to the 65th Territorial regiment on 6 March 1915. He later returned to the chamber, where he was intensely active, participating in numerous debates.

In the general election of 16 November 1919 Bretin was placed second on the Socialist list. He was defeated by the Republicans. In the elections of 11 May 1924 he was placed third on the Socialist list, and was one of five returned. In the general elections of 22 and 29 April 1928 Bretin suffered a setback in the Macon district, losing to Vincent Jacoulat in the second round.

== Later career ==
Betin retired to Chagny in 1928. He continued to be active in the SFIO. In 1937 he was a member of the Commission administrative permantente (CAP), the leadership of the SFIO. The others were René Cabannes, Xavier Magnien, Chatignon and Perigaud. During World War II (1939–1945) he supported Paul Faure. After France was liberated in 1944 he was excluded from the CAP due to his complaisance with the Vichy regime. Théo Bretin died in Chagny on July 12, 1956, aged 77.
