= Navour-sur-Grosne =

- Commune
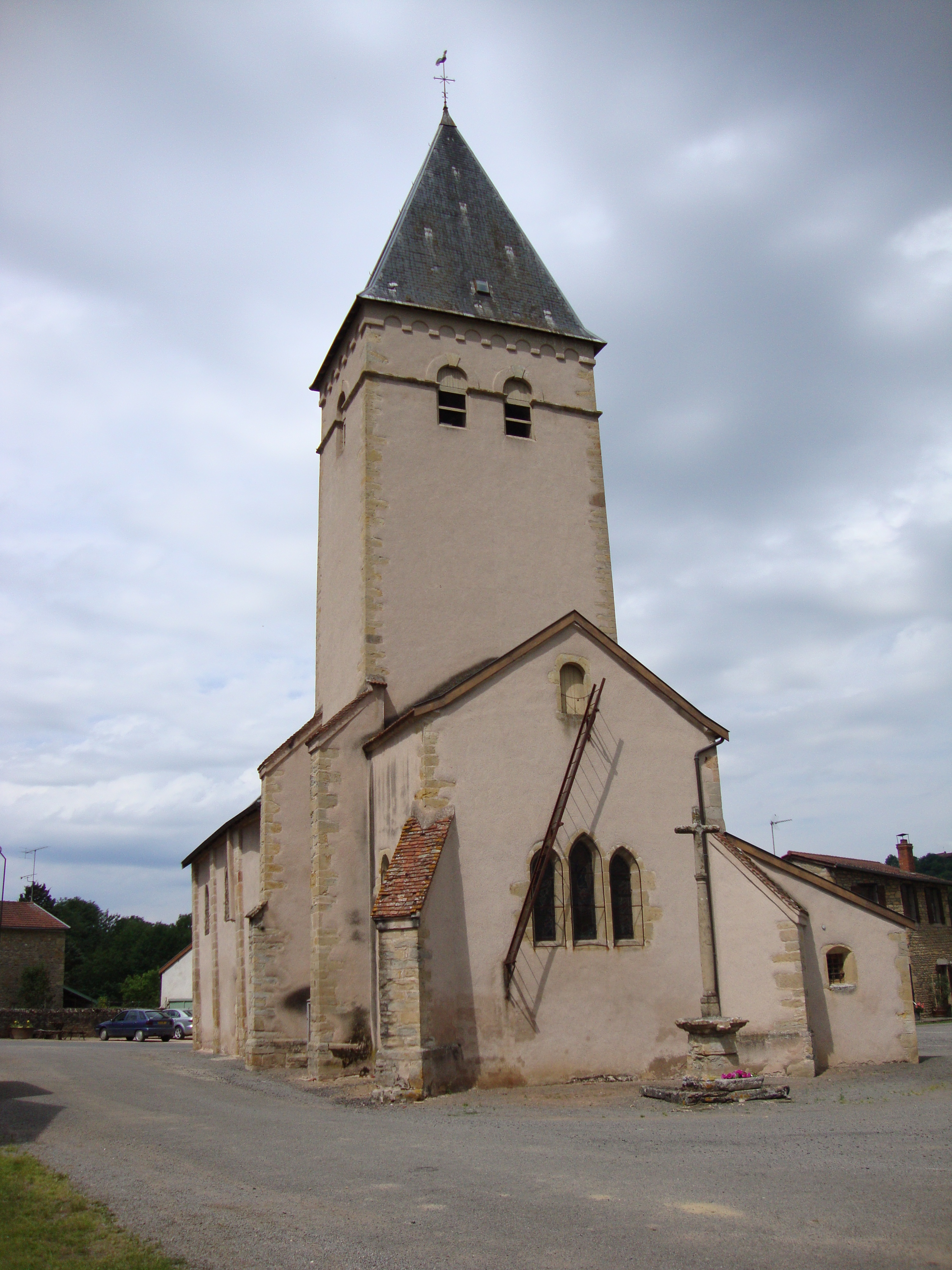
- The church in Clermain
- Location of Navour-sur-Grosne
- Location within France Location within Bourgogne-Franche-Comté
- Coordinates: 46°22′07″N 4°34′56″E
- Country: France
- Region: Bourgogne-Franche-Comté
- Department: Saône-et-Loire
- Arrondissement: Mâcon
- Canton: La Chapelle-de-Guinchay

Government
  - Mayor (2020–2026): Fabienne Prunot
- Area^{1}: 22.76 km^{2} (8.79 sq mi)
- Highest elevation: 570 m (1,870 ft)
- Lowest elevation: 262 m (860 ft)
- Population (2023): 660
  - Density: 29/km^{2} (75/sq mi)
- Time zone: UTC+01:00 (CET)
  - Summer (DST): UTC+02:00 (CEST)
- INSEE/Postal code: 71134 /71520
- ^{1} French Land Register data, which excludes lakes, ponds, glaciers > 1 km^{2} (0.386 sq mi or 247 acres) and river estuaries.

Navour-sur-Grosne (French pronunciation: [navuʁ syʁ ɡʁon], literally Navour on Grosne) is a commune in the Saône-et-Loire department in the region of Bourgogne-Franche-Comté in eastern France. It was established on 1 January 2019 by merger of the former communes of Clermain (the seat), Brandon and Montagny-sur-Grosne.

== See also ==
- Communes of the Saône-et-Loire department
