= Cortambert =

- Commune
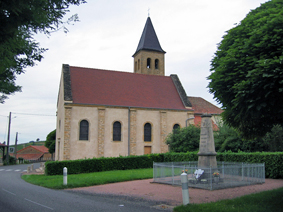
- Location of Cortambert
- Location within France Location within Bourgogne-Franche-Comté
- Coordinates: 46°28′45″N 4°42′54″E
- Country: France
- Region: Bourgogne-Franche-Comté
- Department: Saône-et-Loire
- Arrondissement: Mâcon
- Canton: Cluny
- Intercommunality: Clunisois
- Area^{1}: 16.02 km^{2} (6.19 sq mi)
- Elevation: 336 m (1,102 ft)
- Highest elevation: 505 m (1,657 ft)
- Lowest elevation: 220 m (720 ft)
- Population (2023): 274
  - Density: 17.1/km^{2} (44.3/sq mi)
- Time zone: UTC+01:00 (CET)
  - Summer (DST): UTC+02:00 (CEST)
- INSEE/Postal code: 71146 /71250
- ^{1} French Land Register data, which excludes lakes, ponds, glaciers > 1 km^{2} (0.386 sq mi or 247 acres) and river estuaries.

Cortambert is a commune in the Saône-et-Loire department in the region of Bourgogne-Franche-Comté in eastern France.

== Geography ==
The Grosne forms most of the commune's western border.

== See also ==
- Communes of the Saône-et-Loire department
