= Jalogny =

- Commune
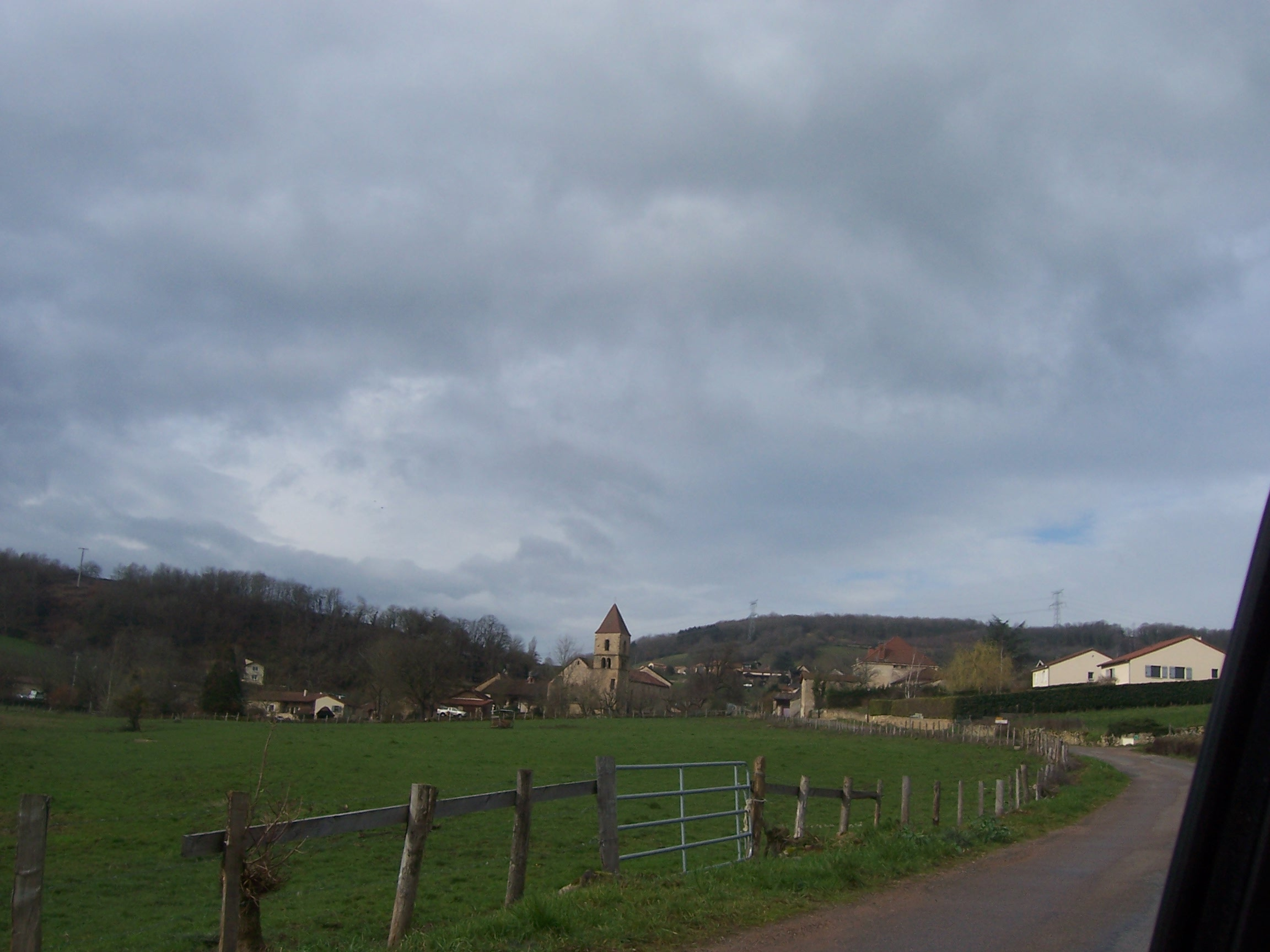
- A general view of Jalogny
- Location of Jalogny
- Location within France Location within Bourgogne-Franche-Comté
- Coordinates: 46°25′11″N 4°37′53″E
- Country: France
- Region: Bourgogne-Franche-Comté
- Department: Saône-et-Loire
- Arrondissement: Mâcon
- Canton: Cluny
- Area^{1}: 10.15 km^{2} (3.92 sq mi)
- Elevation: 200 m (660 ft)
- Highest elevation: 480 m (1,570 ft)
- Lowest elevation: 242 m (794 ft)
- Population (2023): 399
  - Density: 39.3/km^{2} (102/sq mi)
- Time zone: UTC+01:00 (CET)
  - Summer (DST): UTC+02:00 (CEST)
- INSEE/Postal code: 71240 /71250
- ^{1} French Land Register data, which excludes lakes, ponds, glaciers > 1 km^{2} (0.386 sq mi or 247 acres) and river estuaries.

Jalogny (French pronunciation: [ʒalɔɲi]) is a commune in the Saône-et-Loire department in the region of Bourgogne-Franche-Comté in eastern France.

== Geography ==
The Grosne forms most of the commune's southeastern border.

== See also ==
- Communes of the Saône-et-Loire department
