= Mazille =

- Commune
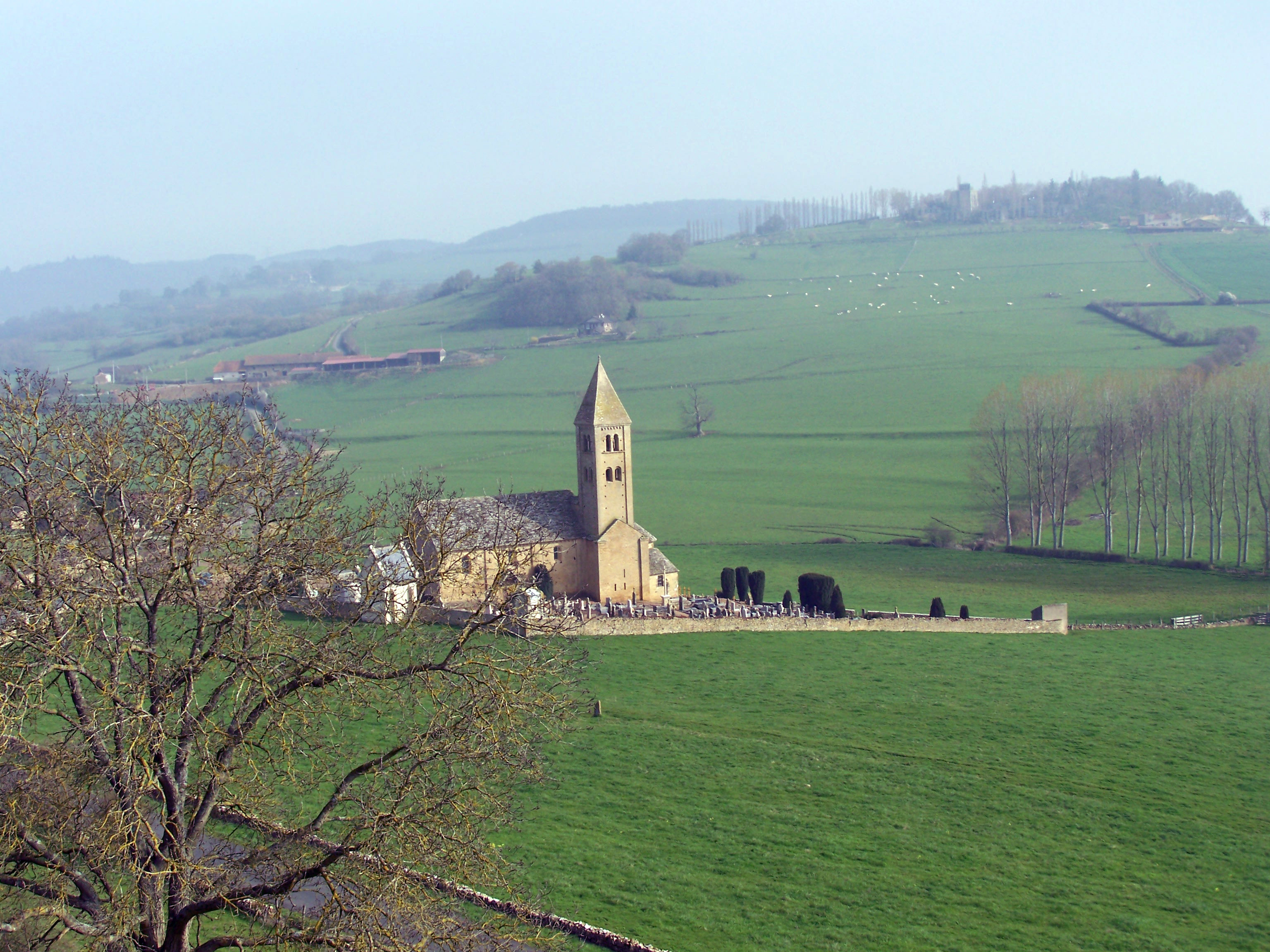
- The church in Mazille
- Location of Mazille
- Location within France Location within Bourgogne-Franche-Comté
- Coordinates: 46°23′35″N 4°36′08″E
- Country: France
- Region: Bourgogne-Franche-Comté
- Department: Saône-et-Loire
- Arrondissement: Mâcon
- Canton: Cluny
- Area^{1}: 9.48 km^{2} (3.66 sq mi)
- Elevation: 313 m (1,027 ft)
- Highest elevation: 476 m (1,562 ft)
- Lowest elevation: 252 m (827 ft)
- Population (2023): 400
  - Density: 42/km^{2} (110/sq mi)
- Time zone: UTC+01:00 (CET)
  - Summer (DST): UTC+02:00 (CEST)
- INSEE/Postal code: 71290 /71250
- ^{1} French Land Register data, which excludes lakes, ponds, glaciers > 1 km^{2} (0.386 sq mi or 247 acres) and river estuaries.

Mazille is a commune in the Saône-et-Loire department in the region of Bourgogne-Franche-Comté in eastern France.

== Geography ==
The Grosne forms the commune's southeastern border.

== See also ==
Carmel of Peace convent designed by Josep Lluís Sert

- Communes of the Saône-et-Loire department
