= Savigny-sur-Grosne =

- Commune
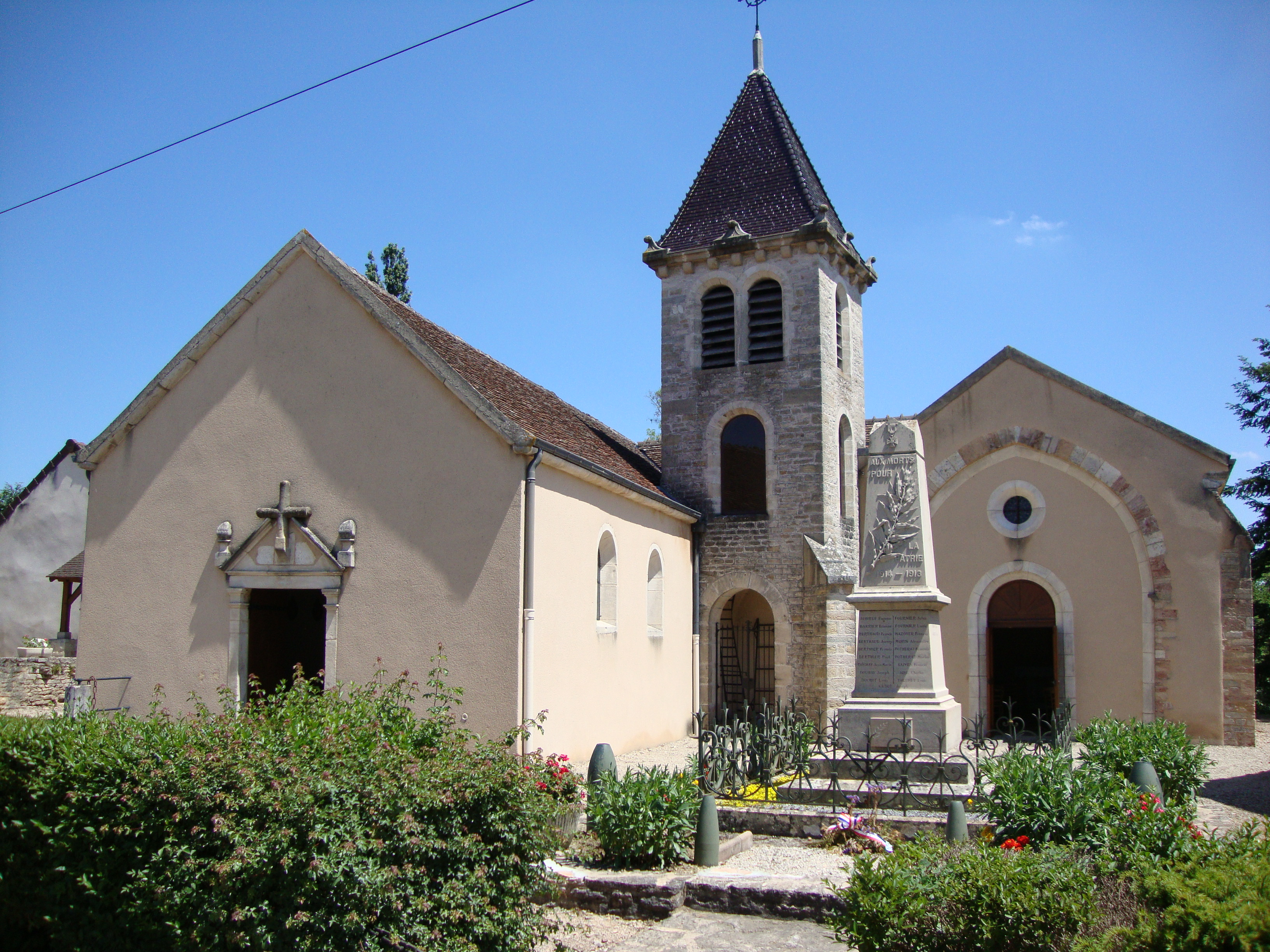
- The church and war memorial in Savigny-sur-Grosne

- Coat of arms
- Location of Savigny-sur-Grosne
- Location within France Location within Bourgogne-Franche-Comté
- Coordinates: 46°35′01″N 4°40′18″E
- Country: France
- Region: Bourgogne-Franche-Comté
- Department: Saône-et-Loire
- Arrondissement: Chalon-sur-Saône
- Canton: Cluny

Government
  - Mayor (2020–2026): Jean-François Pelletier
- Area^{1}: 6.52 km^{2} (2.52 sq mi)
- Elevation: 195 m (640 ft)
- Highest elevation: 335 m (1,099 ft)
- Lowest elevation: 194 m (636 ft)
- Population (2023): 170
  - Density: 26/km^{2} (68/sq mi)
- Time zone: UTC+01:00 (CET)
  - Summer (DST): UTC+02:00 (CEST)
- INSEE/Postal code: 71507 /71460
- ^{1} French Land Register data, which excludes lakes, ponds, glaciers > 1 km^{2} (0.386 sq mi or 247 acres) and river estuaries.

Savigny-sur-Grosne (French pronunciation: [saviɲi syʁ ɡʁon], literally Savigny on Grosne) is a commune in the Saône-et-Loire department in the region of Bourgogne-Franche-Comté in eastern France. The composer and choral conductor Charles Ravier (1934–1984) was born in Savigny-sur-Grosne.

== Geography ==
The Guye flows north through the southeastern part of the commune, then flows into the Grosne, which forms most of the commune's eastern border.

== See also ==
- Communes of the Saône-et-Loire department
