= Charles Ravier =

French composer, music director and conductor

Charles Ravier (5 June 1934 – 5 March 1984) was a 20th-century French composer, music director and choral conductor.

== Biography ==
Born in Savigny-sur-Grosne in Saône-et-Loire, Charles Ravier first studied the violin, then entered the conservatoire de Lyon where he won prizes in harmony, counterpoint and fugue. He was interested in polyphonic music, and particularly in the early repertoire of the Middle Ages in the 17th century. At the end of the 1950s, he formed the Ensemble Polyphonique de la RTF, and performed with this group the music by Guillaume de Machaut, Clément Janequin, Gesualdo, Claudio Monteverdi among others. Interested in the works of Safford Cape, he chose to have the vocal pieces of the Renaissance, and mainly the songs of the 16th century, interpreted by one voice per vocal part. As a composer he is the author of the pieces Les Espaces oubliés, Les chemins de l'imaginaire, L'Apocalypse d'Angers, and Liturgie pour un Dieu mort (cantata). He also premiered contemporary works by Girolamo Arrigo and Sylvano Bussotti. He died in Paris as a result of suicide by jumping.

== Bibliography ==
- Alain Pâris, notice "Charles Ravier" in Dictionnaire des interprètes et de l'interprétation musicale, Éditions Robert Laffont, series "Bouquin" 1989.
