= Bresse-sur-Grosne =

- Commune
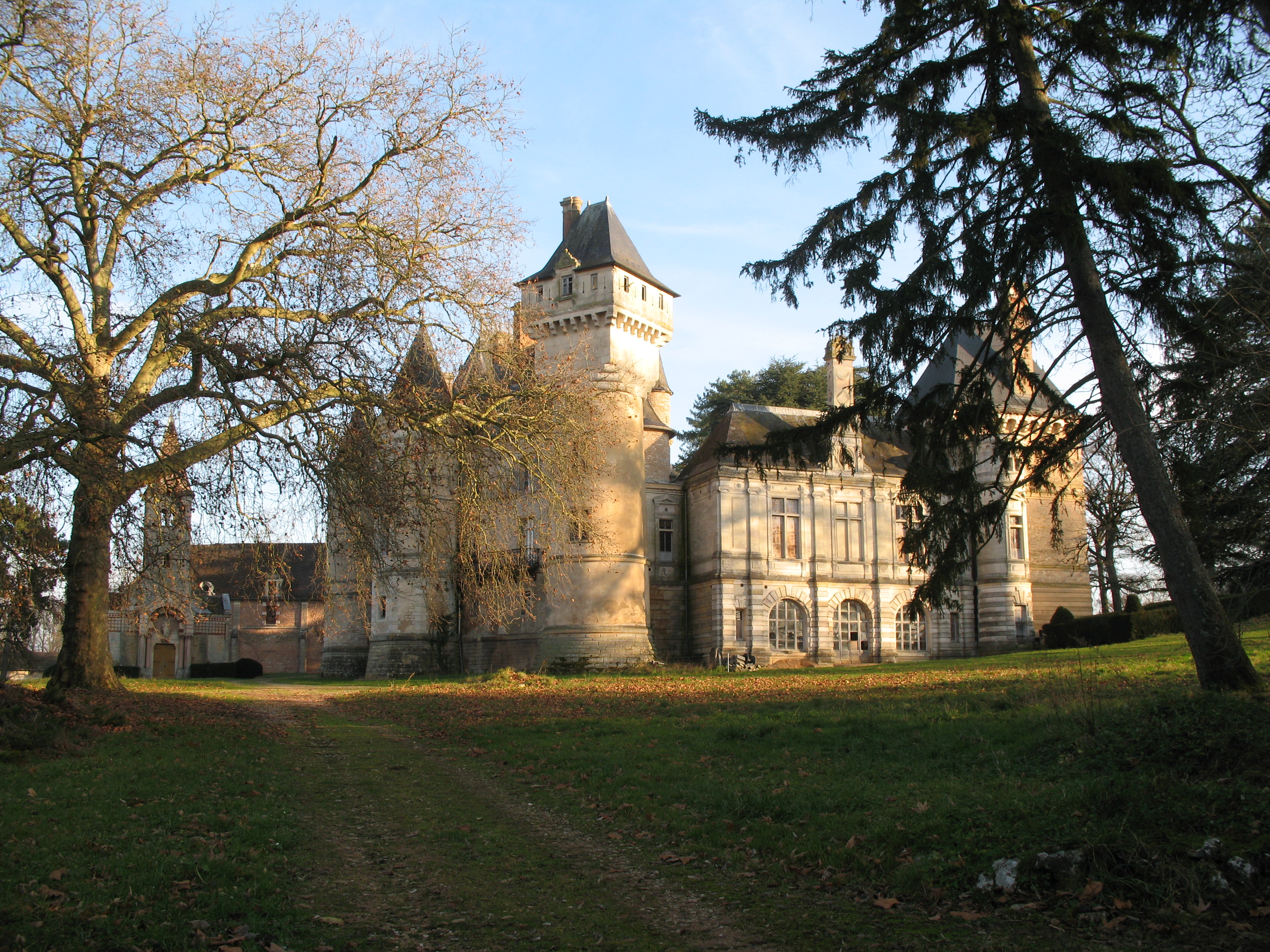
- Chateau
- Location of Bresse-sur-Grosne
- Location within France Location within Bourgogne-Franche-Comté
- Coordinates: 46°35′34″N 4°43′58″E
- Country: France
- Region: Bourgogne-Franche-Comté
- Department: Saône-et-Loire
- Arrondissement: Chalon-sur-Saône
- Canton: Tournus
- Intercommunality: entre Saône et Grosne

Government
  - Mayor (2020–2026): Marc Yves Monnot
- Area^{1}: 10.02 km^{2} (3.87 sq mi)
- Elevation: 210 m (690 ft)
- Highest elevation: 288 m (945 ft)
- Lowest elevation: 189 m (620 ft)
- Population (2023): 184
  - Density: 18.4/km^{2} (47.6/sq mi)
- Time zone: UTC+01:00 (CET)
  - Summer (DST): UTC+02:00 (CEST)
- INSEE/Postal code: 71058 /71460
- ^{1} French Land Register data, which excludes lakes, ponds, glaciers > 1 km^{2} (0.386 sq mi or 247 acres) and river estuaries.

Bresse-sur-Grosne (French pronunciation: [bʁɛs syʁ ɡʁon], literally Bresse on Grosne) is a commune in the Saône-et-Loire department in the region of Bourgogne-Franche-Comté in eastern France.

== Geography ==
The river Grosne forms part of the commune's northwestern border.

== See also ==
- Communes of the Saône-et-Loire department
