= Sainte-Cécile, Saône-et-Loire =

Sainte-Cécile
- Commune
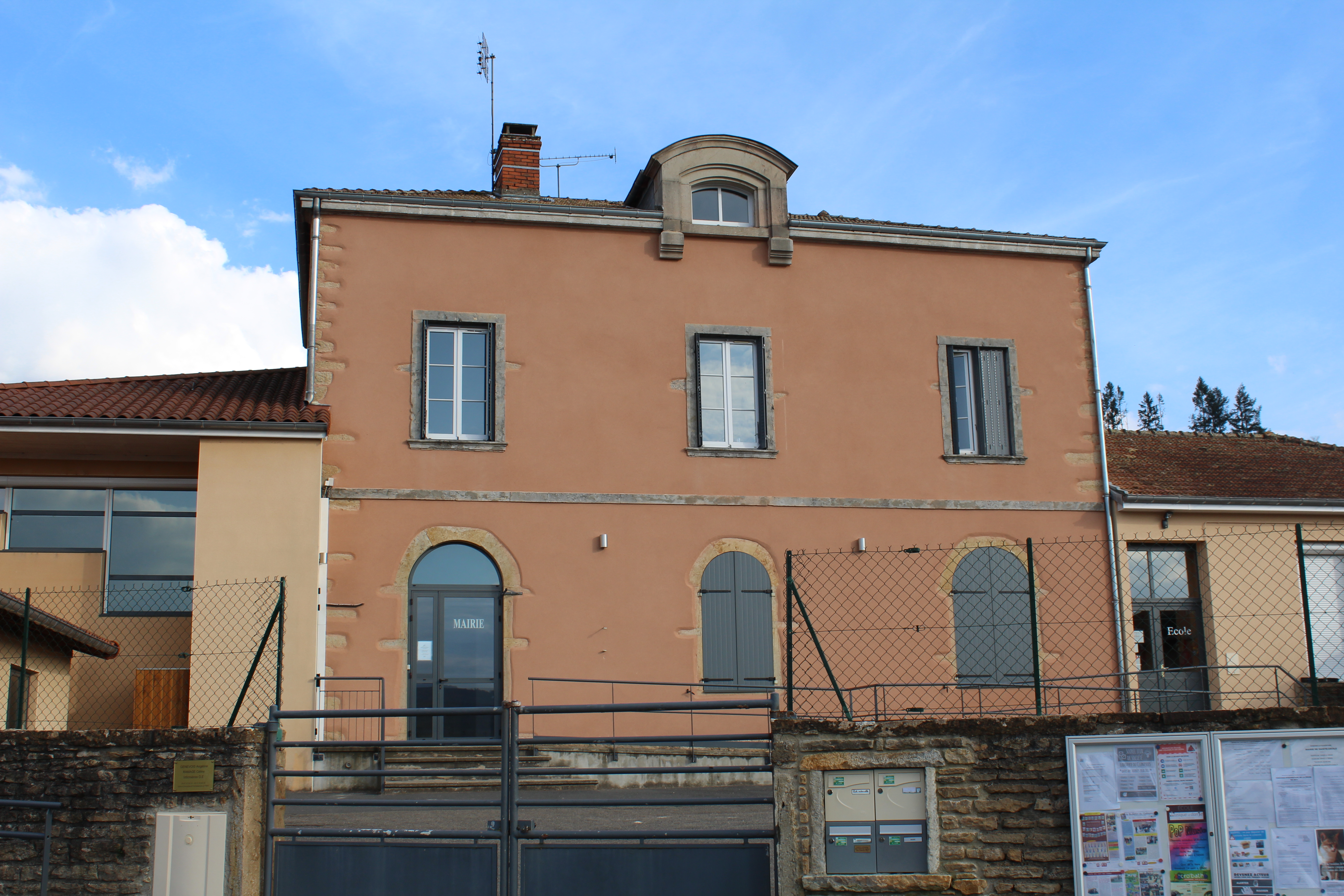
- The town hall in Sainte-Cécile
- Location of Sainte-Cécile
- Location within France Location within Bourgogne-Franche-Comté
- Coordinates: 46°23′22″N 4°37′12″E
- Country: France
- Region: Bourgogne-Franche-Comté
- Department: Saône-et-Loire
- Arrondissement: Mâcon
- Canton: Cluny
- Area^{1}: 7.26 km^{2} (2.80 sq mi)
- Elevation: 250 m (820 ft)
- Highest elevation: 544 m (1,785 ft)
- Lowest elevation: 249 m (817 ft)
- Population (2023): 283
  - Density: 39.0/km^{2} (101/sq mi)
- Time zone: UTC+01:00 (CET)
  - Summer (DST): UTC+02:00 (CEST)
- INSEE/Postal code: 71397 /71250
- ^{1} French Land Register data, which excludes lakes, ponds, glaciers > 1 km^{2} (0.386 sq mi or 247 acres) and river estuaries.

Sainte-Cécile (French pronunciation: [sɛ̃t sesil]) is a commune in the Saône-et-Loire department in the region of Bourgogne-Franche-Comté in eastern France.

== Geography ==
The Grosne forms most of the commune's western and northern borders.

== See also ==
- Communes of the Saône-et-Loire department
