= Marnay, Saône-et-Loire =

Marnay
- Commune
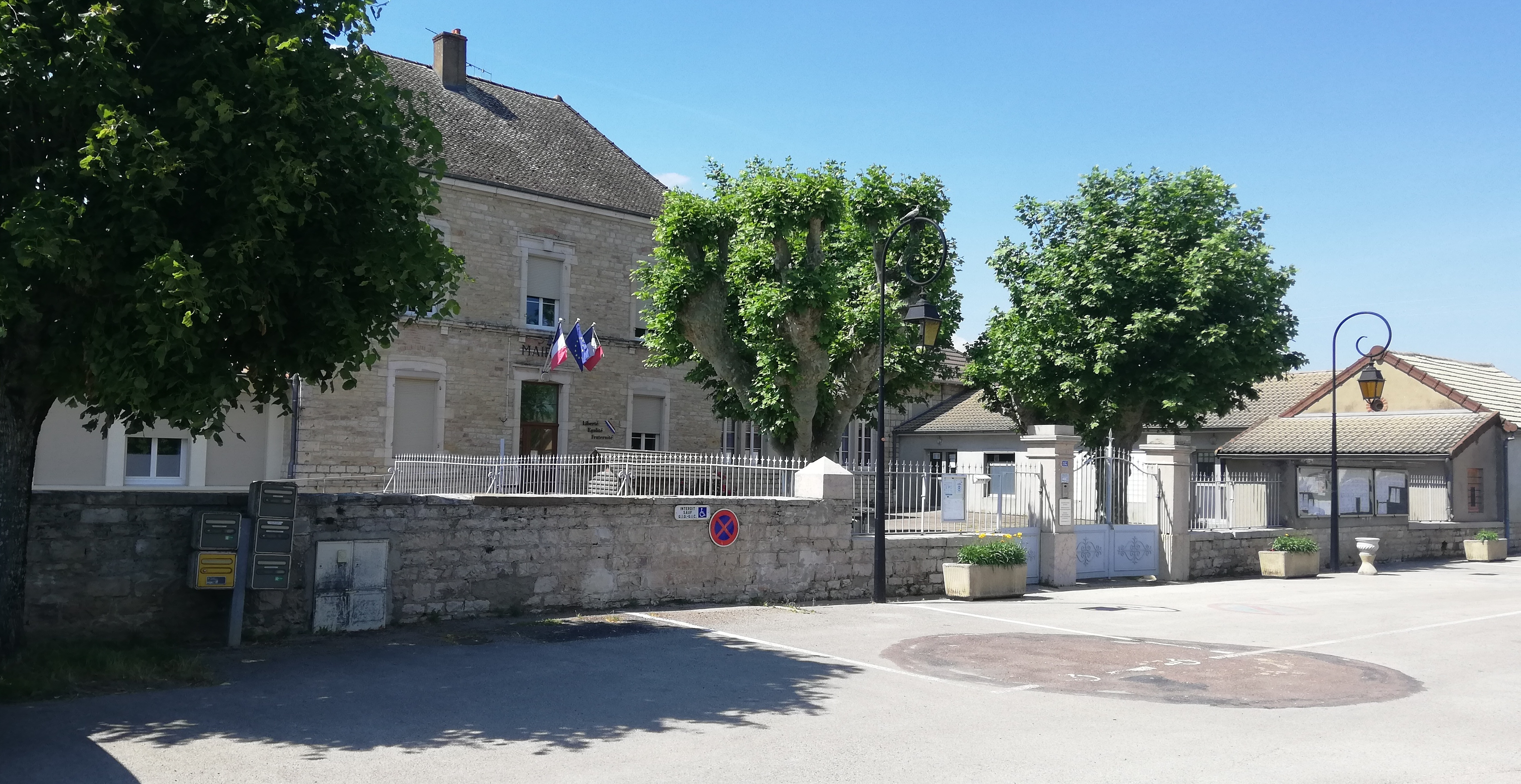
- Town hall
- Location of Marnay
- Location within France Location within Bourgogne-Franche-Comté
- Coordinates: 46°42′09″N 4°55′36″E
- Country: France
- Region: Bourgogne-Franche-Comté
- Department: Saône-et-Loire
- Arrondissement: Chalon-sur-Saône
- Canton: Saint-Rémy
- Intercommunality: CA Le Grand Chalon
- Area^{1}: 5.08 km^{2} (1.96 sq mi)
- Elevation: 178 m (584 ft)
- Highest elevation: 180 m (590 ft)
- Lowest elevation: 171 m (561 ft)
- Population (2023): 533
  - Density: 105/km^{2} (272/sq mi)
- Time zone: UTC+01:00 (CET)
  - Summer (DST): UTC+02:00 (CEST)
- INSEE/Postal code: 71283 /71240
- ^{1} French Land Register data, which excludes lakes, ponds, glaciers > 1 km^{2} (0.386 sq mi or 247 acres) and river estuaries.

Marnay (French pronunciation: [maʁnɛ]) is a commune in the Saône-et-Loire department in the region of Bourgogne-Franche-Comté in eastern France.

== Geography ==
The river Grosne flows into the Saône in the commune.

== See also ==
- Communes of the Saône-et-Loire department
