= Malay, Saône-et-Loire =

Malay
- Commune
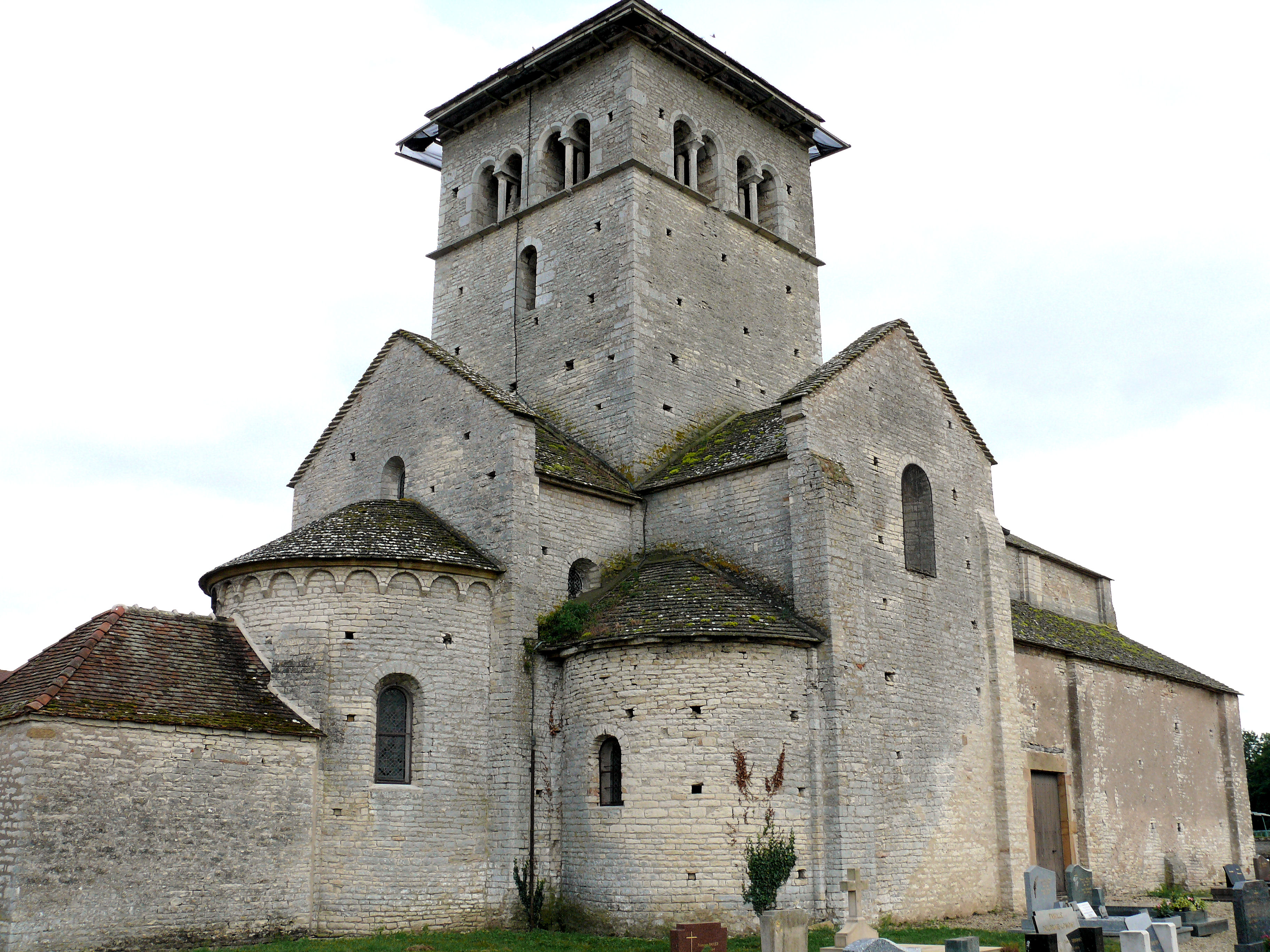
- The church in Malay

- Coat of arms
- Location of Malay
- Location within France Location within Bourgogne-Franche-Comté
- Coordinates: 46°34′02″N 4°40′57″E
- Country: France
- Region: Bourgogne-Franche-Comté
- Department: Saône-et-Loire
- Arrondissement: Chalon-sur-Saône
- Canton: Cluny

Government
  - Mayor (2023–2026): Jacques Camand
- Area^{1}: 12.14 km^{2} (4.69 sq mi)
- Elevation: 216 m (709 ft)
- Highest elevation: 320 m (1,050 ft)
- Lowest elevation: 194 m (636 ft)
- Population (2023): 225
  - Density: 18.5/km^{2} (48.0/sq mi)
- Time zone: UTC+01:00 (CET)
  - Summer (DST): UTC+02:00 (CEST)
- INSEE/Postal code: 71272 /71460
- ^{1} French Land Register data, which excludes lakes, ponds, glaciers > 1 km^{2} (0.386 sq mi or 247 acres) and river estuaries.

Malay (French pronunciation: [malɛ]) is a commune in the Saône-et-Loire department in the region of Bourgogne-Franche-Comté in eastern France.

== Geography ==
The Grosne flows northwest through the southwestern part of the commune, then forms its northwestern border. The Guye, a tributary of the Grosne, forms part of the commune's southwestern border.

== See also ==
- Communes of the Saône-et-Loire department
