= Bray, Saône-et-Loire =

Bray
- Commune
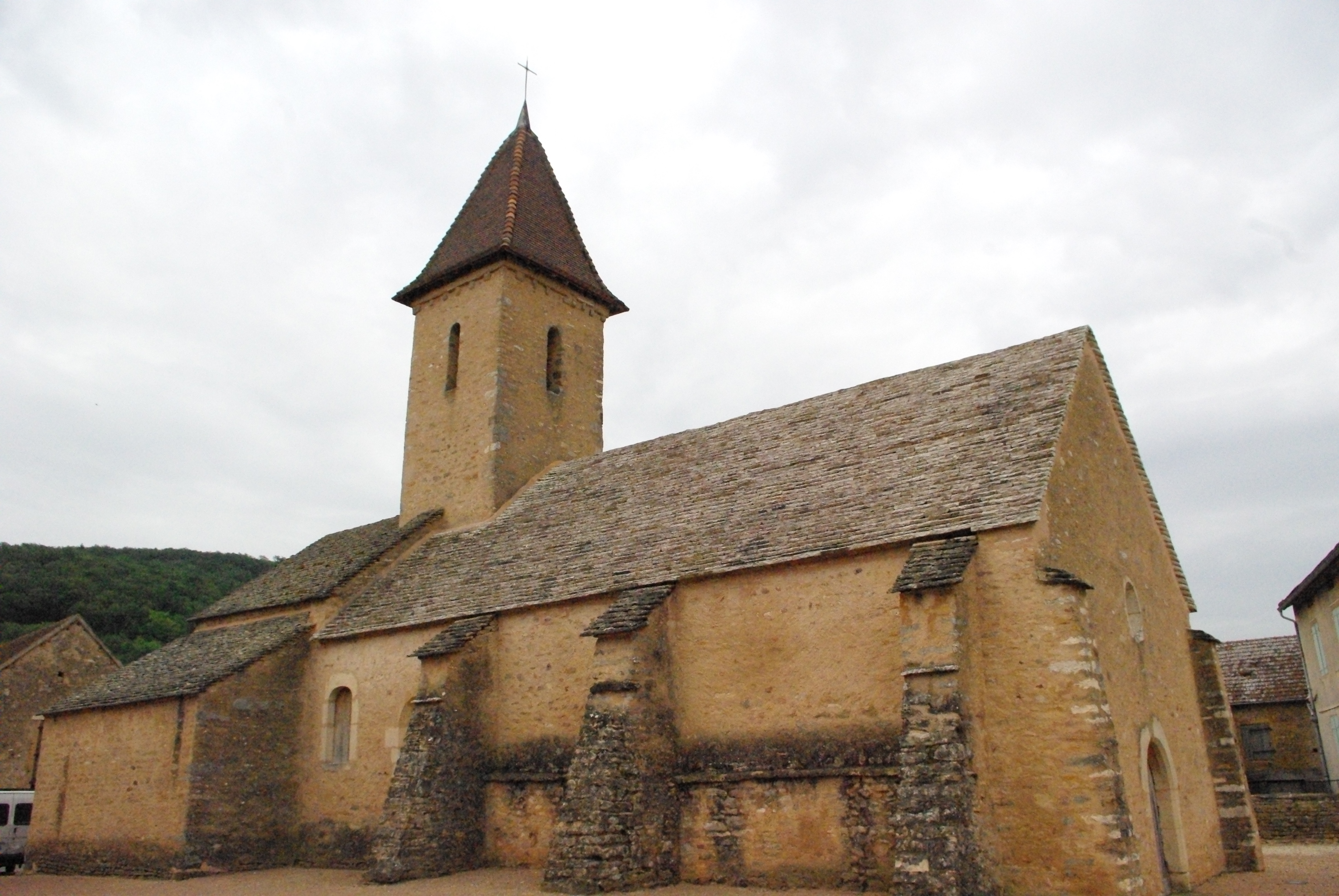
- The church in Bray
- Location of Bray
- Location within France Location within Bourgogne-Franche-Comté
- Coordinates: 46°30′15″N 4°43′19″E
- Country: France
- Region: Bourgogne-Franche-Comté
- Department: Saône-et-Loire
- Arrondissement: Mâcon
- Canton: Cluny
- Intercommunality: Clunisois
- Area^{1}: 9.89 km^{2} (3.82 sq mi)
- Elevation: 270 m (890 ft)
- Highest elevation: 475 m (1,558 ft)
- Lowest elevation: 209 m (686 ft)
- Population (2023): 128
  - Density: 12.9/km^{2} (33.5/sq mi)
- Time zone: UTC+01:00 (CET)
  - Summer (DST): UTC+02:00 (CEST)
- INSEE/Postal code: 71057 /71250
- ^{1} French Land Register data, which excludes lakes, ponds, glaciers > 1 km^{2} (0.386 sq mi or 247 acres) and river estuaries.

Bray (French pronunciation: [bʁɛ]) is a commune in the eastern French department of Saône-et-Loire.

== Geography ==
The river Grosne forms the commune's western boundary.

== See also ==
- Communes of the Saône-et-Loire department
