= Brandon, Saône-et-Loire =

Brandon
- Part of Navour-sur-Grosne
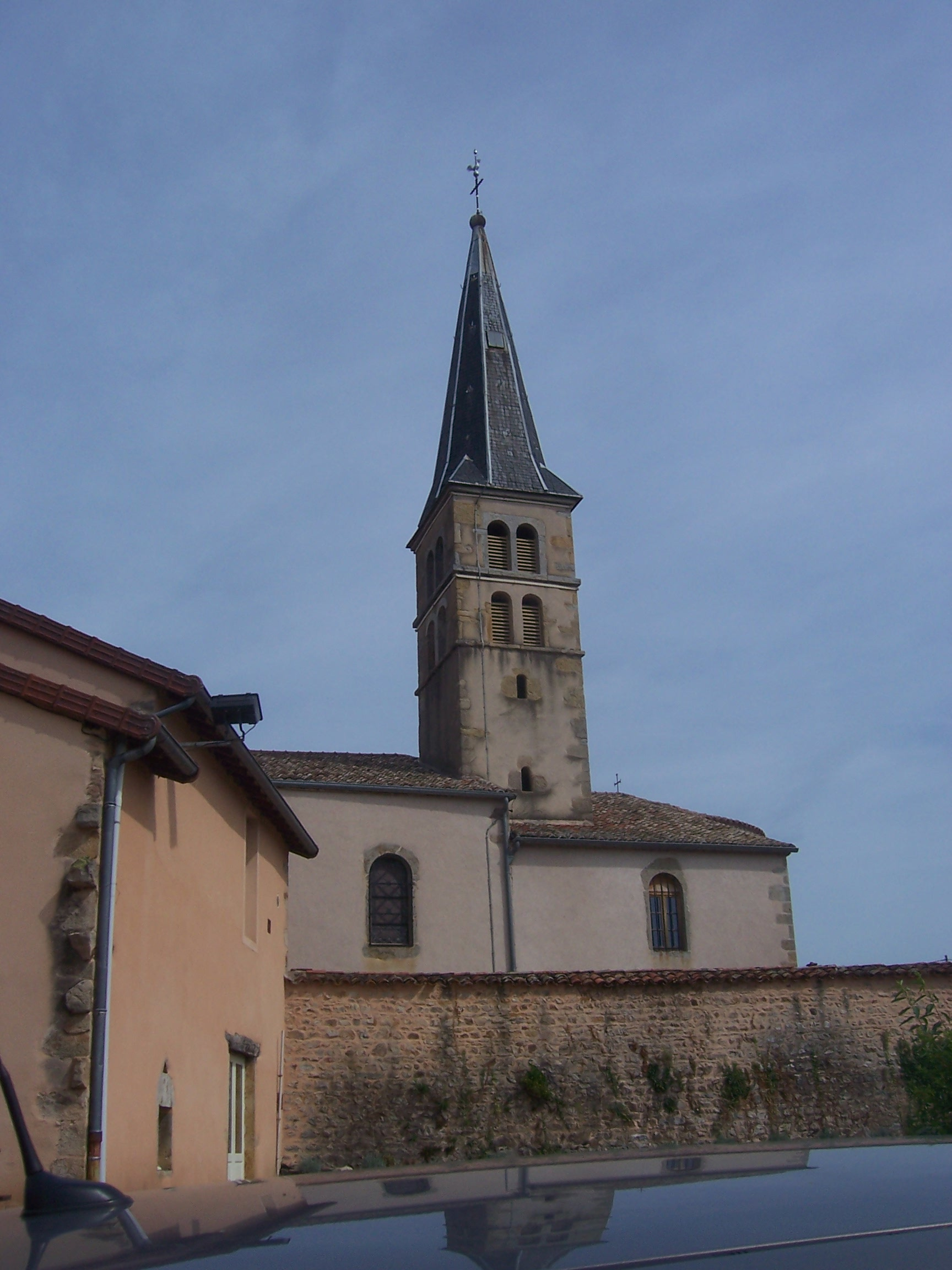
- Location of Brandon
- Location within France Location within Bourgogne-Franche-Comté
- Coordinates: 46°22′09″N 4°34′06″E
- Country: France
- Region: Bourgogne-Franche-Comté
- Department: Saône-et-Loire
- Arrondissement: Mâcon
- Canton: La Chapelle-de-Guinchay
- Commune: Navour-sur-Grosne
- Area^{1}: 10.14 km^{2} (3.92 sq mi)
- Elevation: 286 m (938 ft)
- Highest elevation: 570 m (1,870 ft)
- Lowest elevation: 272 m (892 ft)
- Population (2022): 321
  - Density: 31.7/km^{2} (82.0/sq mi)
- Time zone: UTC+01:00 (CET)
  - Summer (DST): UTC+02:00 (CEST)
- Postal code: 71520
- ^{1} French Land Register data, which excludes lakes, ponds, glaciers > 1 km^{2} (0.386 sq mi or 247 acres) and river estuaries.

Brandon (French pronunciation: [bʁɑ̃dɔ̃]) is a former commune in the Saône-et-Loire department in the region of Bourgogne-Franche-Comté in eastern France. On 1 January 2019, it was merged into the new commune Navour-sur-Grosne.

== Geography ==
The Grosne forms part of the commune's southern border, then flows northeast through the middle of the commune.

== See also ==
- Communes of the Saône-et-Loire department
