= Damerey =

- Commune
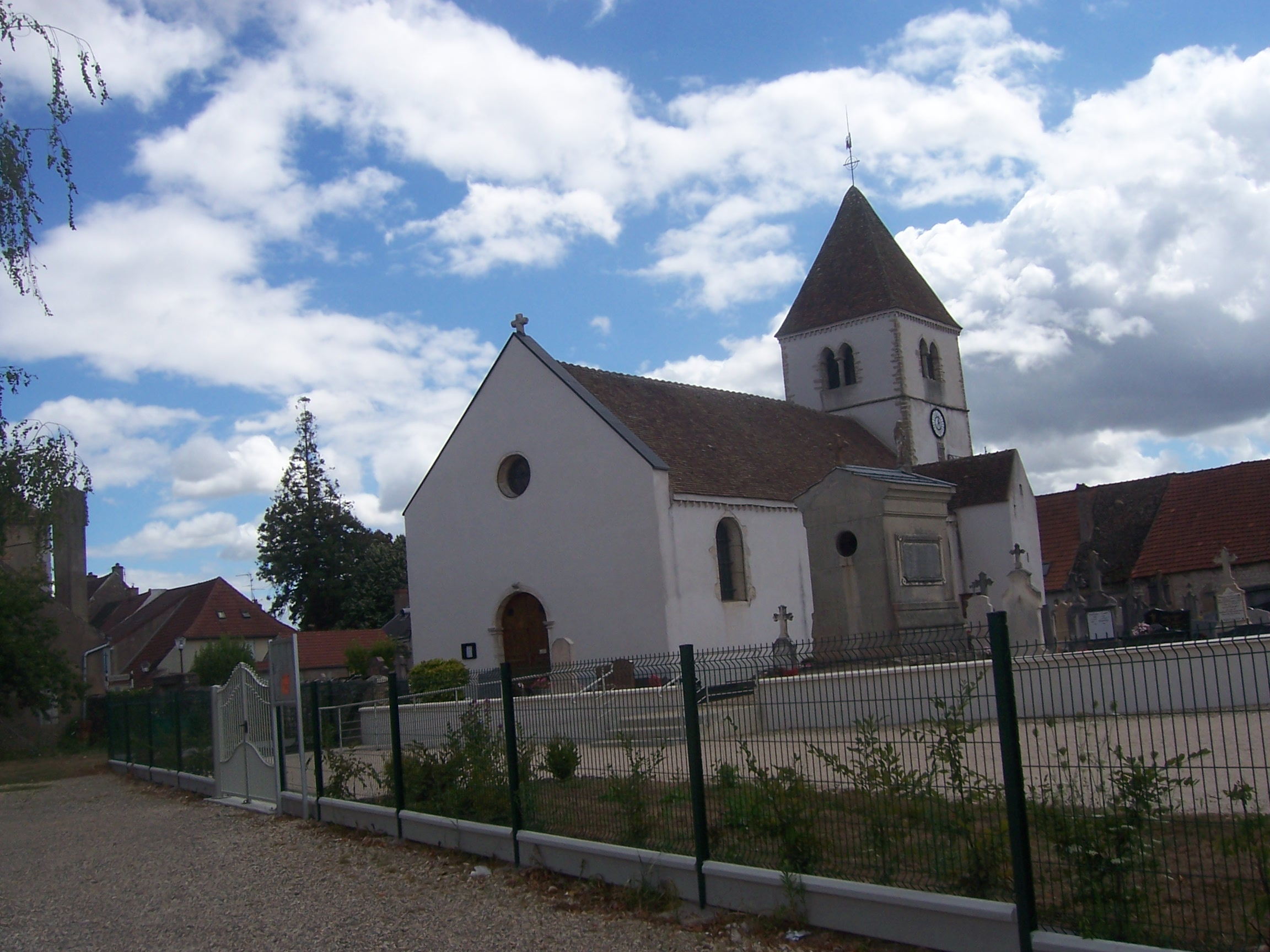
- The church in Damerey
- Location of Damerey
- Location within France Location within Bourgogne-Franche-Comté
- Coordinates: 46°50′07″N 4°59′30″E
- Country: France
- Region: Bourgogne-Franche-Comté
- Department: Saône-et-Loire
- Arrondissement: Chalon-sur-Saône
- Canton: Gergy
- Intercommunality: Saône Doubs Bresse
- Area^{1}: 11.62 km^{2} (4.49 sq mi)
- Elevation: 180 m (590 ft)
- Highest elevation: 196 m (643 ft)
- Lowest elevation: 174 m (571 ft)
- Population (2023): 545
  - Density: 46.9/km^{2} (121/sq mi)
- Time zone: UTC+01:00 (CET)
  - Summer (DST): UTC+02:00 (CEST)
- INSEE/Postal code: 71167 /71620
- ^{1} French Land Register data, which excludes lakes, ponds, glaciers > 1 km^{2} (0.386 sq mi or 247 acres) and river estuaries.

Damerey (French pronunciation: [damʁɛ]) is a commune in the Saône-et-Loire department in the region of Bourgogne-Franche-Comté in eastern France.

== Geography ==
Damerey is part of the Bresse Chalonnaise. The Saône defines the northwest boundary of the commune.

== Population ==
Historical population
Year	Pop.	±% p.a.
1968	389	—
1975	364	−0.94%
1982	409	+1.68%
1990	432	+0.69%
1999	421	−0.29%
2007	541	+3.18%
2012	579	+1.37%
2017	558	−0.74%
2023	545	−0.39%
Source: INSEE

== Notable people ==
- Marie Guillot (9 September 1880 – 5 March 1934) was born in Damerey. She was a teacher in Saône-et-Loire and a pioneer of trade unionism in primary education.
- Roger Mercier: The commune holds the original work of this man, a roadside artist who since 1984 has built a remarkable city of Hispanic inspiration with buildings and sculptures in painted concrete. At the age of 80 he continued maintenance and development of his work.

== See also ==
- Communes of the Saône-et-Loire department
