= Sercy =

- Commune
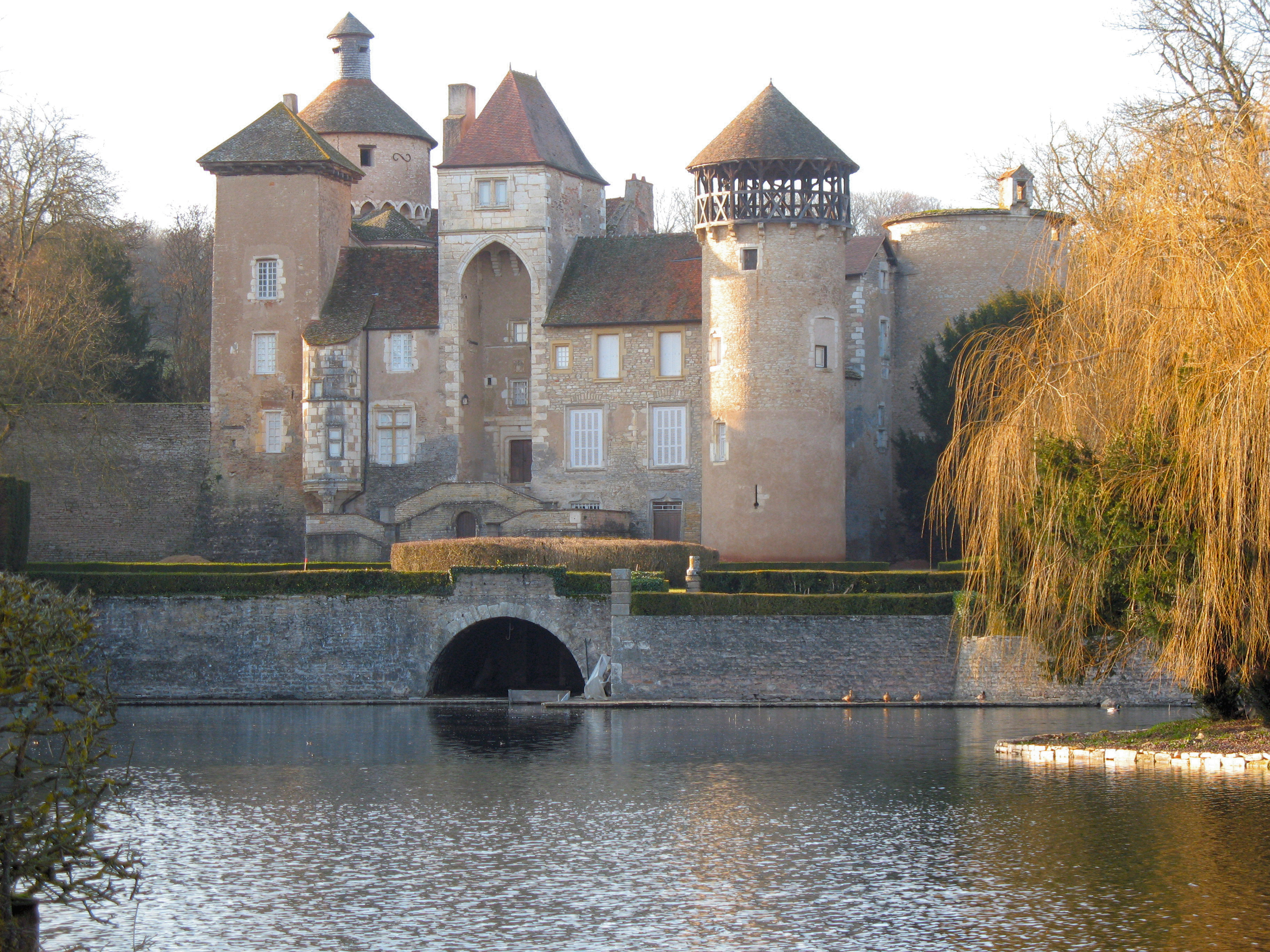
- Chateau
- Location of Sercy
- Location within France Location within Bourgogne-Franche-Comté
- Coordinates: 46°36′18″N 4°41′12″E
- Country: France
- Region: Bourgogne-Franche-Comté
- Department: Saône-et-Loire
- Arrondissement: Chalon-sur-Saône
- Canton: Givry
- Intercommunality: Sud Côte Chalonnaise

Government
  - Mayor (2020–2026): Thierry Parret
- Area^{1}: 5.8 km^{2} (2.2 sq mi)
- Elevation: 232 m (761 ft)
- Highest elevation: 265 m (869 ft)
- Lowest elevation: 189 m (620 ft)
- Population (2023): 103
  - Density: 18/km^{2} (46/sq mi)
- Time zone: UTC+01:00 (CET)
  - Summer (DST): UTC+02:00 (CEST)
- INSEE/Postal code: 71515 /71460
- ^{1} French Land Register data, which excludes lakes, ponds, glaciers > 1 km^{2} (0.386 sq mi or 247 acres) and river estuaries.

Sercy (French pronunciation: [sɛʁsi]) is a commune in the Saône-et-Loire department in the region of Bourgogne-Franche-Comté in eastern France.

== Geography ==
The Grosne flows north through the eastern part of the commune.

== See also ==
- Communes of the Saône-et-Loire department
