= Massilly =

- Commune
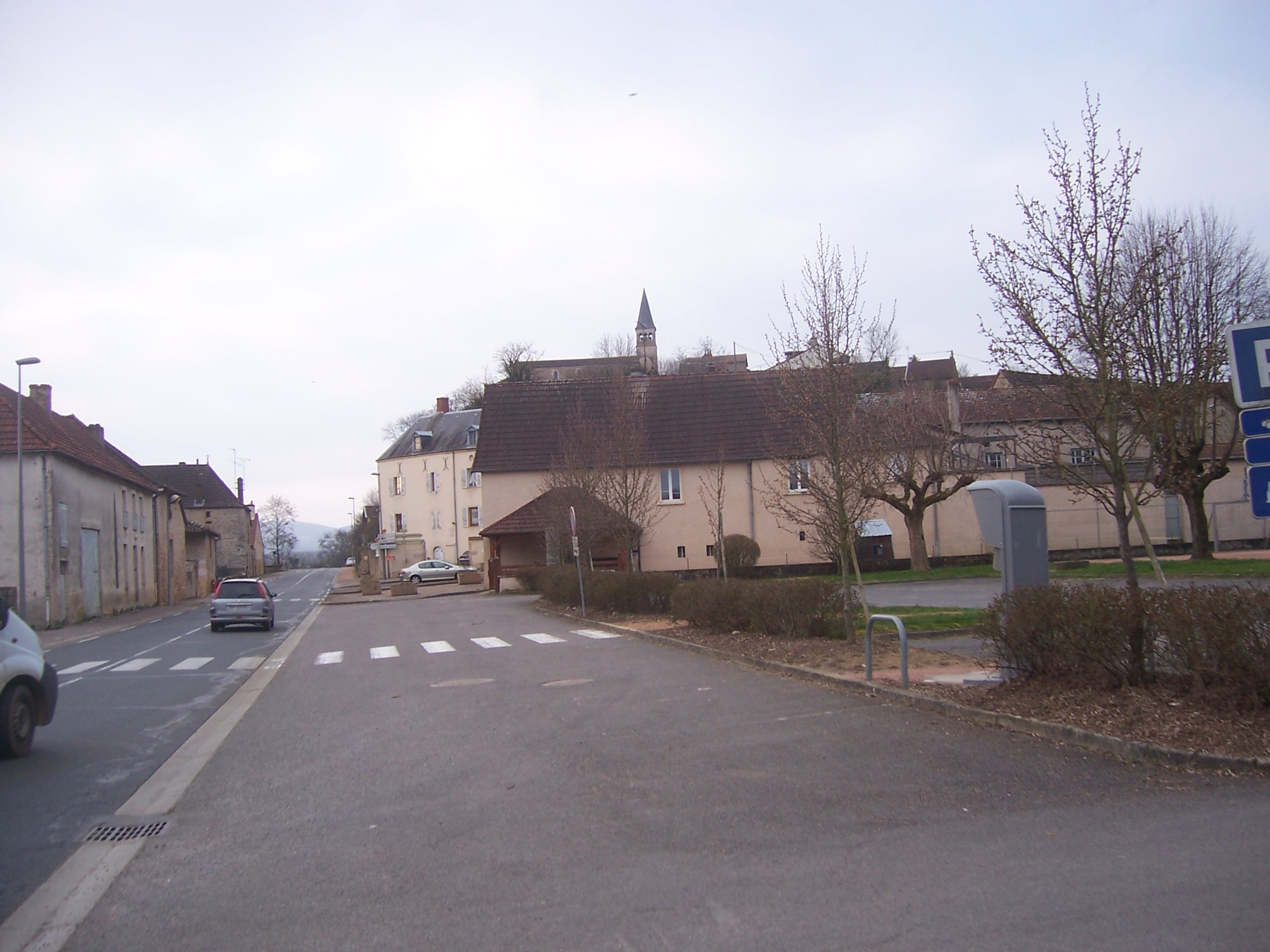
- A view within Massilly
- Location of Massilly
- Location within France Location within Bourgogne-Franche-Comté
- Coordinates: 46°29′27″N 4°40′19″E
- Country: France
- Region: Bourgogne-Franche-Comté
- Department: Saône-et-Loire
- Arrondissement: Mâcon
- Canton: Cluny
- Area^{1}: 5.44 km^{2} (2.10 sq mi)
- Elevation: 222 m (728 ft)
- Highest elevation: 306 m (1,004 ft)
- Lowest elevation: 212 m (696 ft)
- Population (2023): 301
  - Density: 55.3/km^{2} (143/sq mi)
- Time zone: UTC+01:00 (CET)
  - Summer (DST): UTC+02:00 (CEST)
- INSEE/Postal code: 71287 /71250
- ^{1} French Land Register data, which excludes lakes, ponds, glaciers > 1 km^{2} (0.386 sq mi or 247 acres) and river estuaries.

Massilly is a commune in the Saône-et-Loire department in the region of Bourgogne-Franche-Comté in eastern France.

== Geography ==
The Grosne forms part of the commune's southeastern border, then flows north through its eastern part.

== See also ==
- Communes of the Saône-et-Loire department
