= Lournand =

- Commune
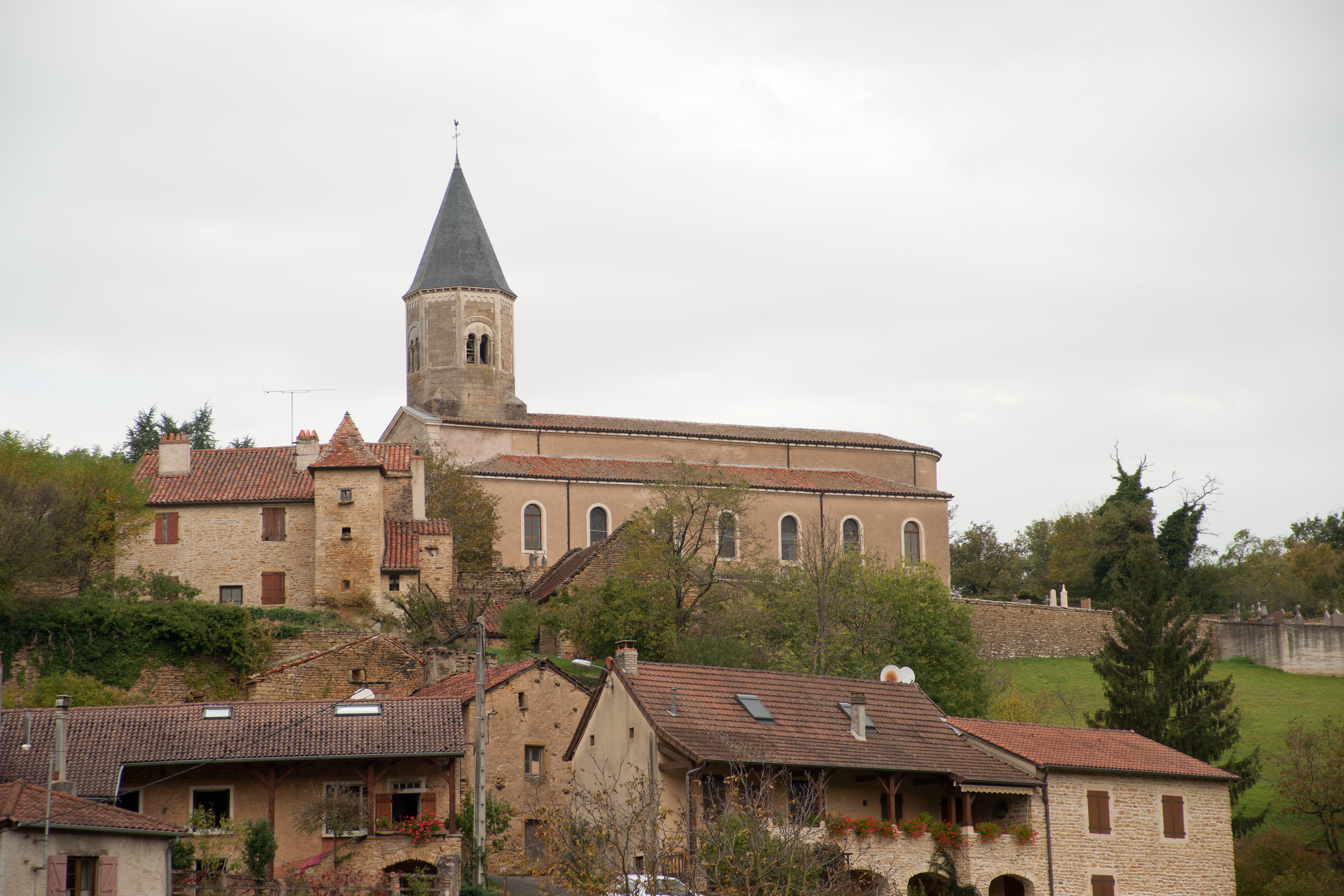
- The church in Lournand
- Location of Lournand
- Location within France Location within Bourgogne-Franche-Comté
- Coordinates: 46°27′24″N 4°39′03″E
- Country: France
- Region: Bourgogne-Franche-Comté
- Department: Saône-et-Loire
- Arrondissement: Mâcon
- Canton: Cluny

Government
  - Mayor (2024–2026): Marjorie Dumontoy
- Area^{1}: 11.22 km^{2} (4.33 sq mi)
- Elevation: 315 m (1,033 ft)
- Highest elevation: 506 m (1,660 ft)
- Lowest elevation: 222 m (728 ft)
- Population (2023): 322
  - Density: 28.7/km^{2} (74.3/sq mi)
- Time zone: UTC+01:00 (CET)
  - Summer (DST): UTC+02:00 (CEST)
- INSEE/Postal code: 71264 /71250
- ^{1} French Land Register data, which excludes lakes, ponds, glaciers > 1 km^{2} (0.386 sq mi or 247 acres) and river estuaries.

Lournand (French pronunciation: [luʁnɑ̃]) is a commune in the Saône-et-Loire department in the region of Bourgogne-Franche-Comté in eastern France.

== Geography ==
The Grosne forms the commune's eastern border.

== See also ==
- Communes of the Saône-et-Loire department
