= Saint-Bonnet-des-Bruyères =

- Commune
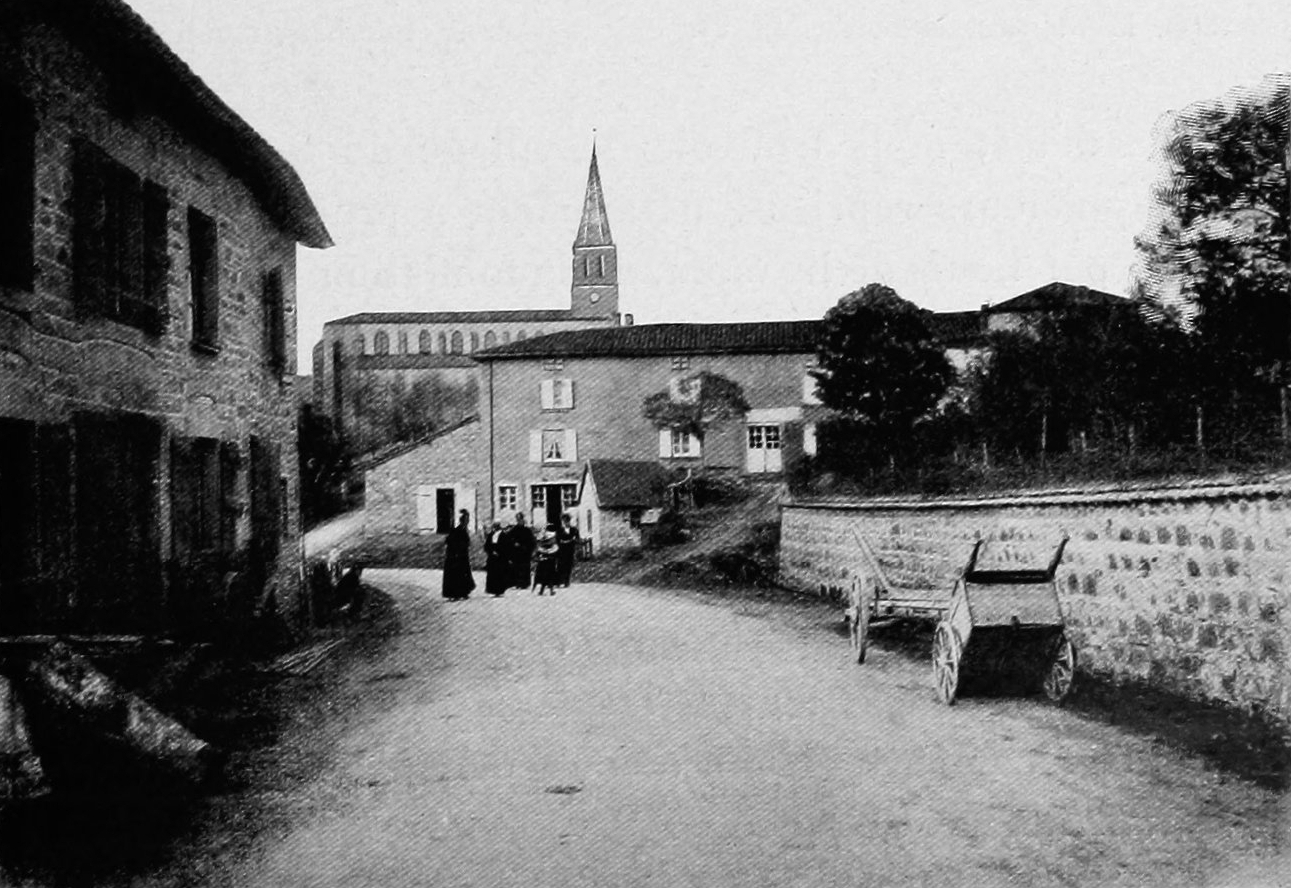
- Saint-Bonnet-des-Bruyères, in the early 20th century
- Location of Saint-Bonnet-des-Bruyères
- Location within France Location within Auvergne-Rhône-Alpes
- Coordinates: 46°16′15″N 4°28′12″E
- Country: France
- Region: Auvergne-Rhône-Alpes
- Department: Rhône
- Arrondissement: Villefranche-sur-Saône
- Canton: Thizy-les-Bourgs
- Intercommunality: Saône-Beaujolais

Government
  - Mayor (2020–2026): Martine Cartillier
- Area^{1}: 21.20 km^{2} (8.19 sq mi)
- Highest elevation: 801 m (2,628 ft)
- Lowest elevation: 413 m (1,355 ft)
- Population (2023): 368
  - Density: 17.4/km^{2} (45.0/sq mi)
- Time zone: UTC+01:00 (CET)
  - Summer (DST): UTC+02:00 (CEST)
- INSEE/Postal code: 69182 /69790
- ^{1} French Land Register data, which excludes lakes, ponds, glaciers > 1 km^{2} (0.386 sq mi or 247 acres) and river estuaries.

Saint-Bonnet-des-Bruyères (French pronunciation: [sɛ̃ bɔnɛ de bʁɥijɛʁ]) is a commune in the Rhône department in eastern France.

== Geography ==
The river Grosne has its source in the commune.

== See also ==
- Communes of the Rhône department
