= Clermain =

- Part of Navour-sur-Grosne
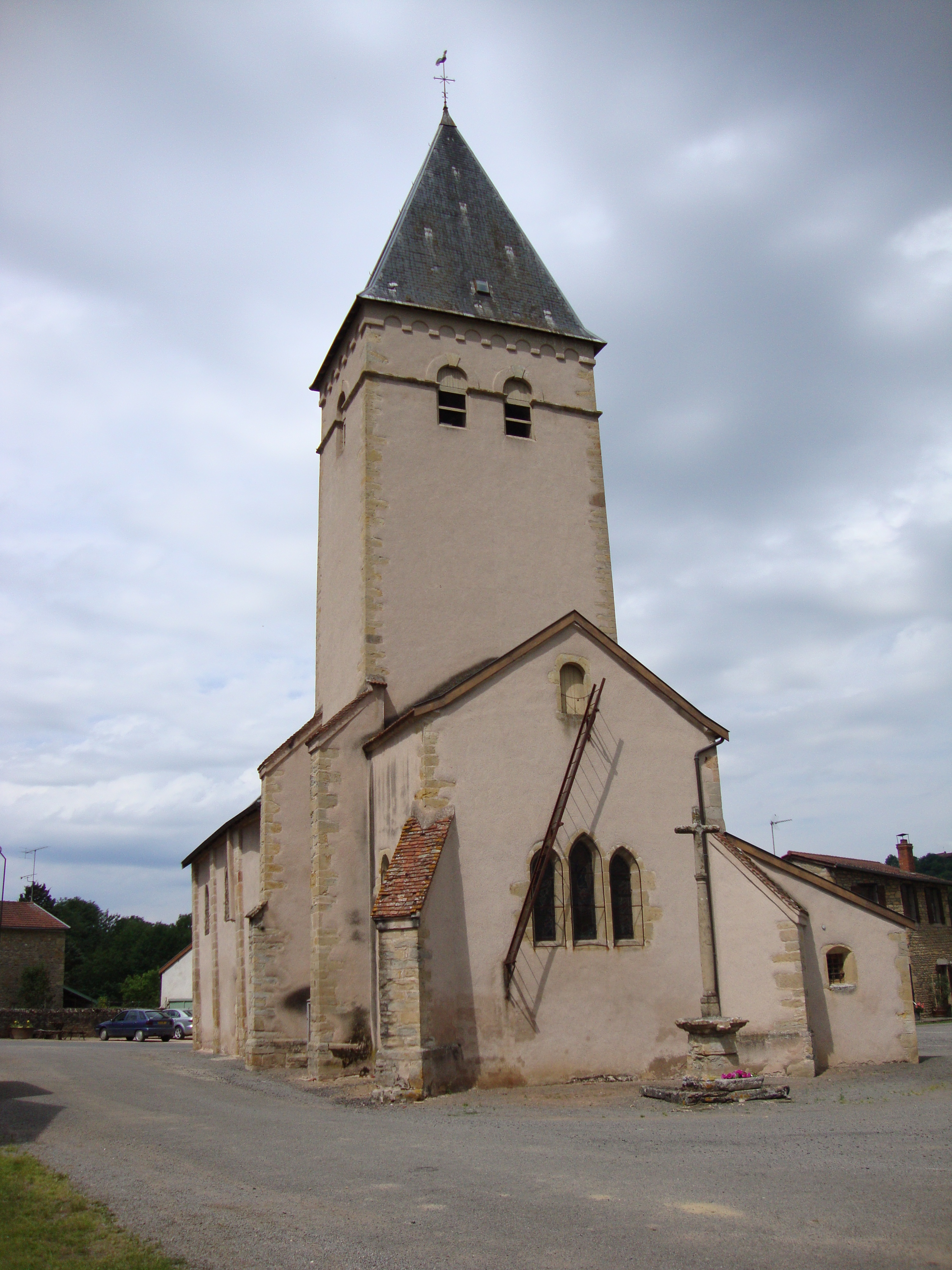
- Location of Clermain
- Location within France Location within Bourgogne-Franche-Comté
- Coordinates: 46°22′07″N 4°34′56″E
- Country: France
- Region: Bourgogne-Franche-Comté
- Department: Saône-et-Loire
- Arrondissement: Mâcon
- Canton: La Chapelle-de-Guinchay
- Commune: Navour-sur-Grosne
- Area^{1}: 5.78 km^{2} (2.23 sq mi)
- Elevation: 271 m (889 ft)
- Highest elevation: 545 m (1,788 ft)
- Lowest elevation: 262 m (860 ft)
- Population (2022): 240
  - Density: 42/km^{2} (110/sq mi)
- Time zone: UTC+01:00 (CET)
  - Summer (DST): UTC+02:00 (CEST)
- Postal code: 71520
- ^{1} French Land Register data, which excludes lakes, ponds, glaciers > 1 km^{2} (0.386 sq mi or 247 acres) and river estuaries.

Clermain (French pronunciation: [klɛʁmɛ̃]) is a former commune in the Saône-et-Loire department in the region of Bourgogne-Franche-Comté in eastern France. On 1 January 2019, it was merged into the new commune Navour-sur-Grosne.

== Geography ==
The Grosne flows northeastward through the middle of the commune.

== See also ==
- Communes of the Saône-et-Loire department
