= Messey-sur-Grosne =

- Commune
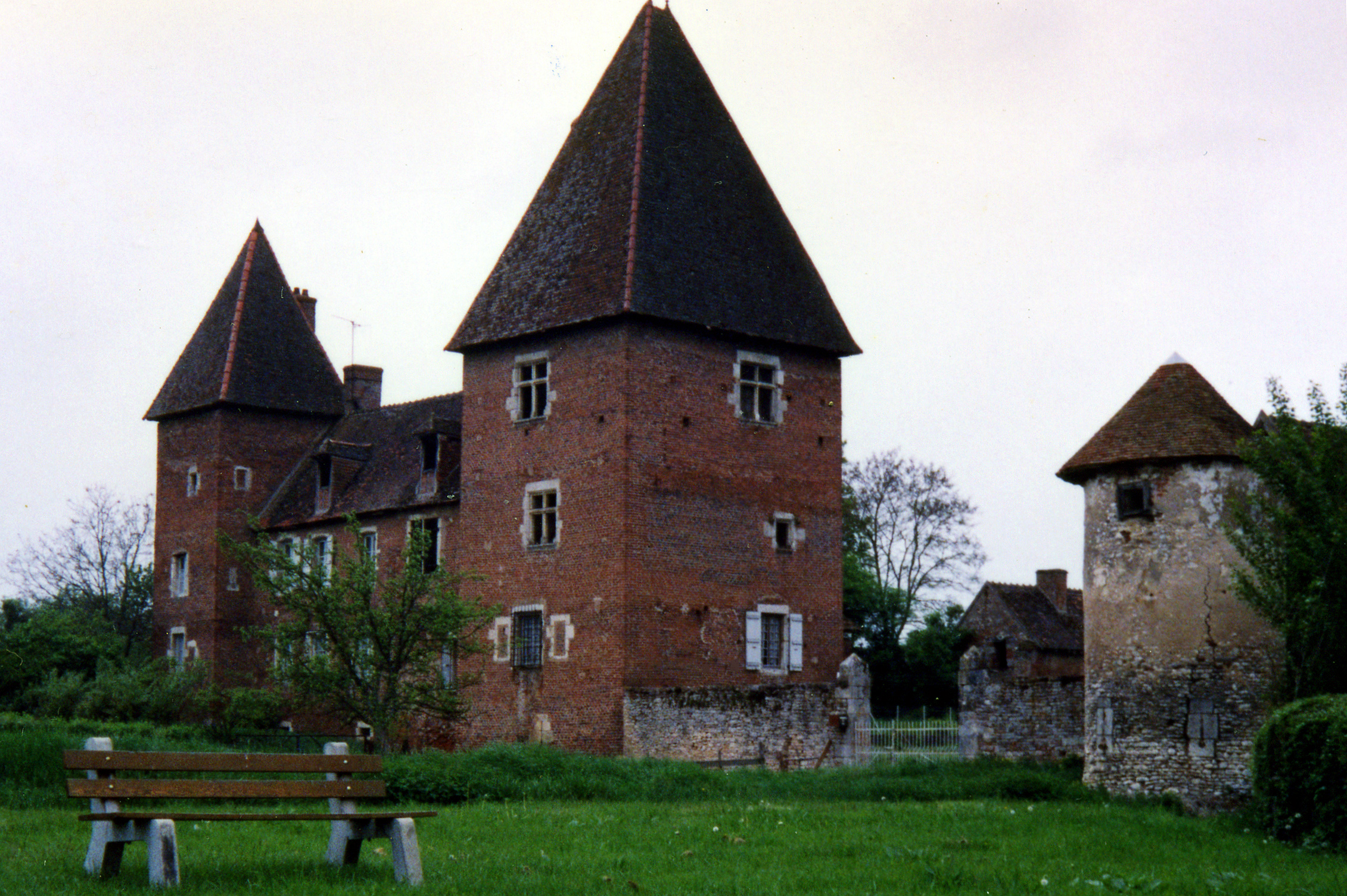
- Chateau
- Location of Messey-sur-Grosne
- Location within France Location within Bourgogne-Franche-Comté
- Coordinates: 46°38′40″N 4°44′40″E
- Country: France
- Region: Bourgogne-Franche-Comté
- Department: Saône-et-Loire
- Arrondissement: Chalon-sur-Saône
- Canton: Givry
- Area^{1}: 15.21 km^{2} (5.87 sq mi)
- Elevation: 189 m (620 ft)
- Highest elevation: 224 m (735 ft)
- Lowest elevation: 181 m (594 ft)
- Population (2023): 742
  - Density: 48.8/km^{2} (126/sq mi)
- Time zone: UTC+01:00 (CET)
  - Summer (DST): UTC+02:00 (CEST)
- INSEE/Postal code: 71296 /71390
- ^{1} French Land Register data, which excludes lakes, ponds, glaciers > 1 km^{2} (0.386 sq mi or 247 acres) and river estuaries.

Messey-sur-Grosne (French pronunciation: [mesɛ syʁ ɡʁon], literally Messey on Grosne) is a commune in the Saône-et-Loire department in the region of Bourgogne-Franche-Comté in eastern France.

== Geography ==
The Goutteuse flows southeast through the middle of the commune, crosses the village, then flows into the Grosne, which forms the commune's southeastern border.

== See also ==
- Communes of the Saône-et-Loire department
