= Montagny-sur-Grosne =

- Part of Navour-sur-Grosne
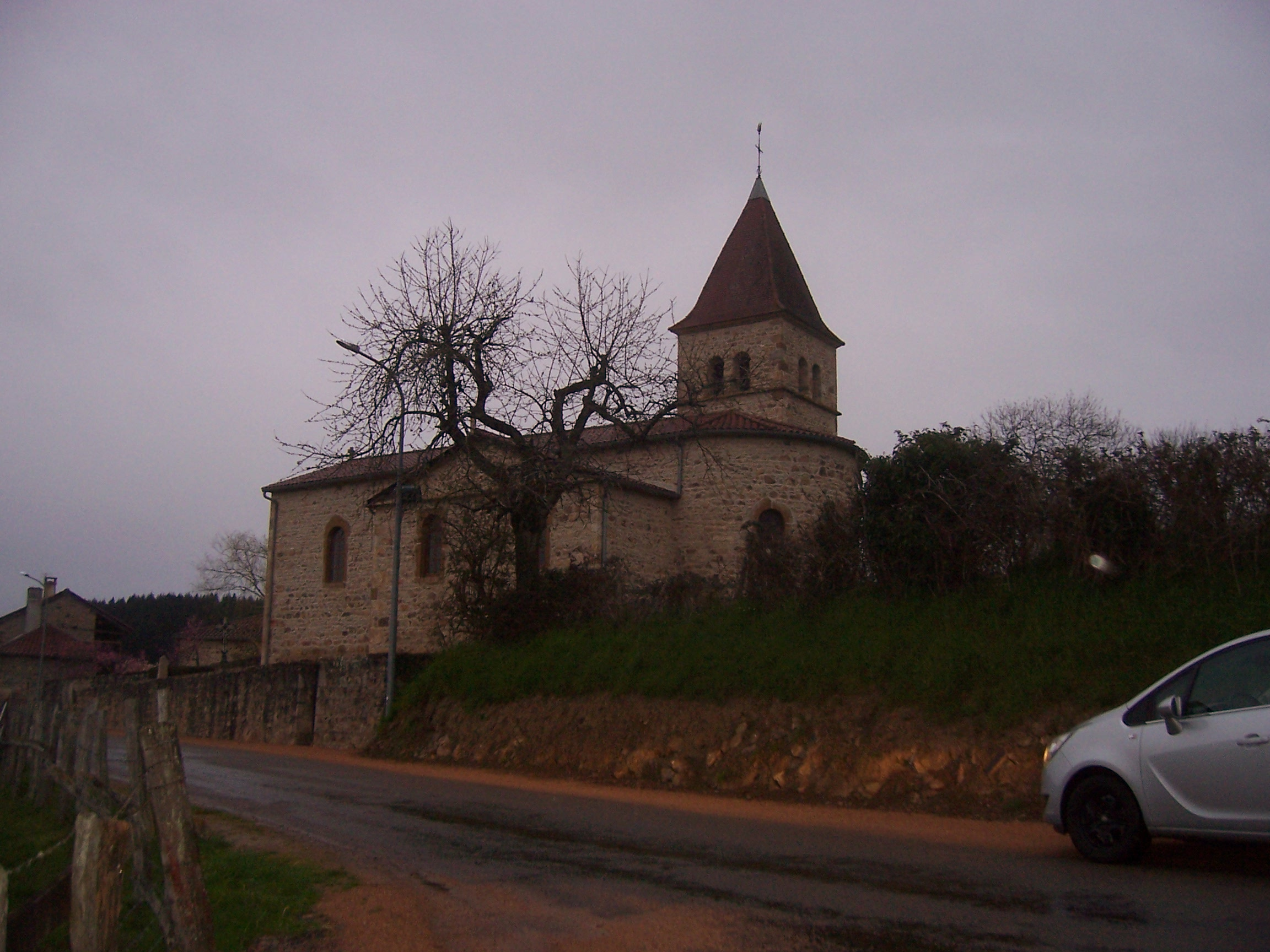
- Location of Montagny-sur-Grosne
- Location within France Location within Bourgogne-Franche-Comté
- Coordinates: 46°21′24″N 4°33′03″E
- Country: France
- Region: Bourgogne-Franche-Comté
- Department: Saône-et-Loire
- Arrondissement: Mâcon
- Canton: La Chapelle-de-Guinchay
- Commune: Navour-sur-Grosne
- Area^{1}: 6.84 km^{2} (2.64 sq mi)
- Elevation: 420 m (1,380 ft)
- Highest elevation: 535 m (1,755 ft)
- Lowest elevation: 283 m (928 ft)
- Population (2022): 97
  - Density: 14/km^{2} (37/sq mi)
- Time zone: UTC+01:00 (CET)
  - Summer (DST): UTC+02:00 (CEST)
- Postal code: 71520
- ^{1} French Land Register data, which excludes lakes, ponds, glaciers > 1 km^{2} (0.386 sq mi or 247 acres) and river estuaries.

Montagny-sur-Grosne (French pronunciation: [mɔ̃taɲi syʁ ɡʁon], literally Montagny on Grosne) is a former commune in the Saône-et-Loire department in the region of Bourgogne-Franche-Comté in eastern France. On 1 January 2019, it was merged into the new commune Navour-sur-Grosne.

== Geography ==
The river Grosne forms part of the commune's eastern border. Surrounded by acres of beechwood and Douglas fir plantation, this little village with its own microclimate sits on the hill and looks southward toward the Chateau d'Ouilly. The town is renowned locally for its annual fête du pain (bread festival), during which the villagers and nearby residents meet at a baker's with a large wood oven. Everybody brings food, pastry, pizzas and bread to cook in the oven, which has been stoked with wood from the forest. People will then either sample some of the Beaujolais wine grown only a few kilometres away across the Fut D'Avenas or enjoy some of the meandering walking trails criss-crossing the countryside.

== See also ==
- Communes of the Saône-et-Loire department
