= Saint-Cyr, Saône-et-Loire =

Saint-Cyr
- Commune
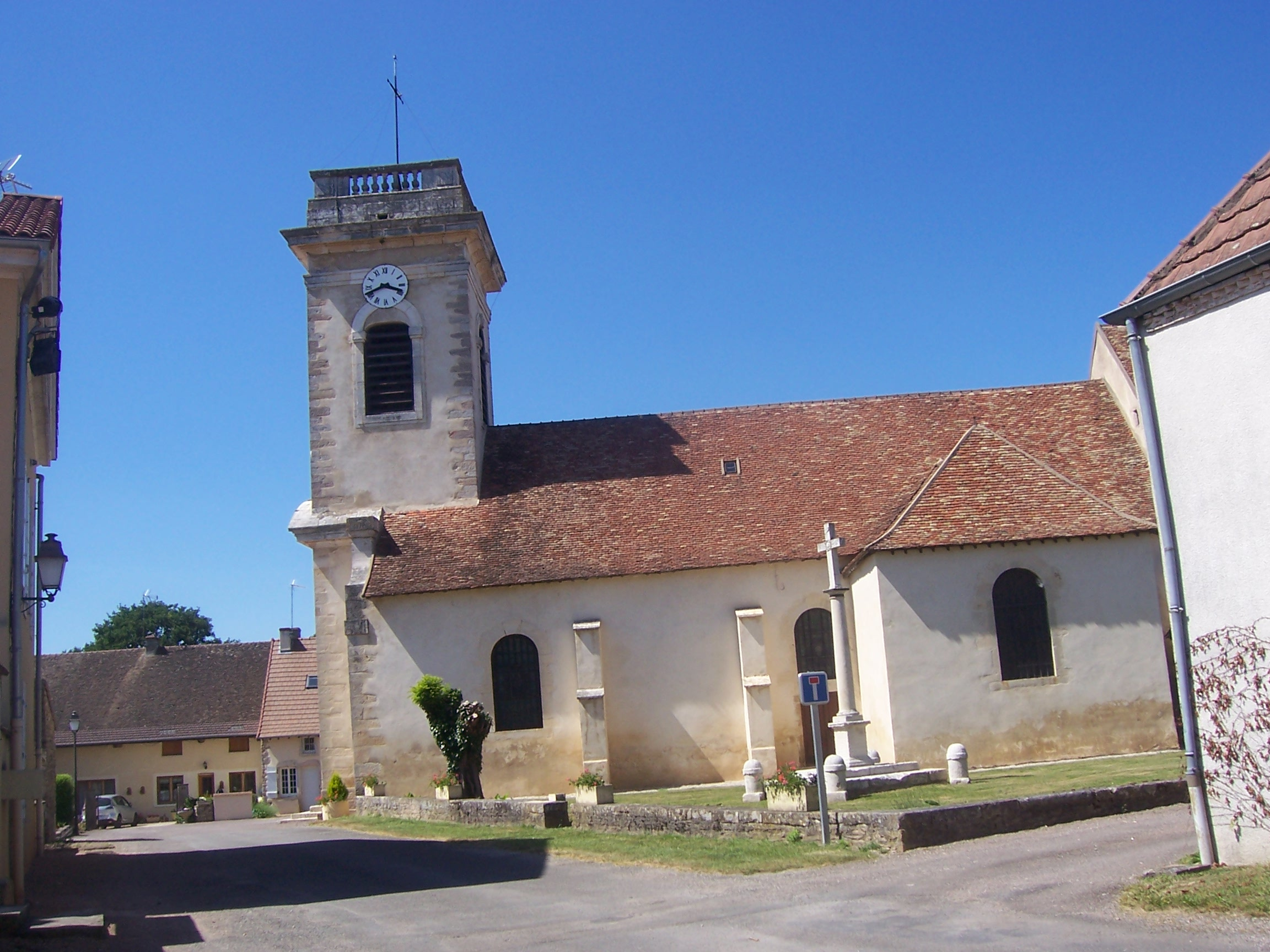
- The church in Saint-Cyr
- Location of Saint-Cyr
- Location within France Location within Bourgogne-Franche-Comté
- Coordinates: 46°40′54″N 4°53′26″E
- Country: France
- Region: Bourgogne-Franche-Comté
- Department: Saône-et-Loire
- Arrondissement: Chalon-sur-Saône
- Canton: Tournus
- Intercommunality: entre Saône et Grosne

Government
  - Mayor (2020–2026): Christian Protet
- Area^{1}: 13.12 km^{2} (5.07 sq mi)
- Elevation: 138 m (453 ft)
- Highest elevation: 193 m (633 ft)
- Lowest elevation: 173 m (568 ft)
- Population (2023): 770
  - Density: 59/km^{2} (150/sq mi)
- Time zone: UTC+01:00 (CET)
  - Summer (DST): UTC+02:00 (CEST)
- INSEE/Postal code: 71402 /71240
- ^{1} French Land Register data, which excludes lakes, ponds, glaciers > 1 km^{2} (0.386 sq mi or 247 acres) and river estuaries.

Saint-Cyr (French pronunciation: [sɛ̃ siʁ]) is a commune in the Saône-et-Loire department in the region of Bourgogne-Franche-Comté in eastern France.

== Geography ==
The Grosne forms most of the commune's northwestern border.

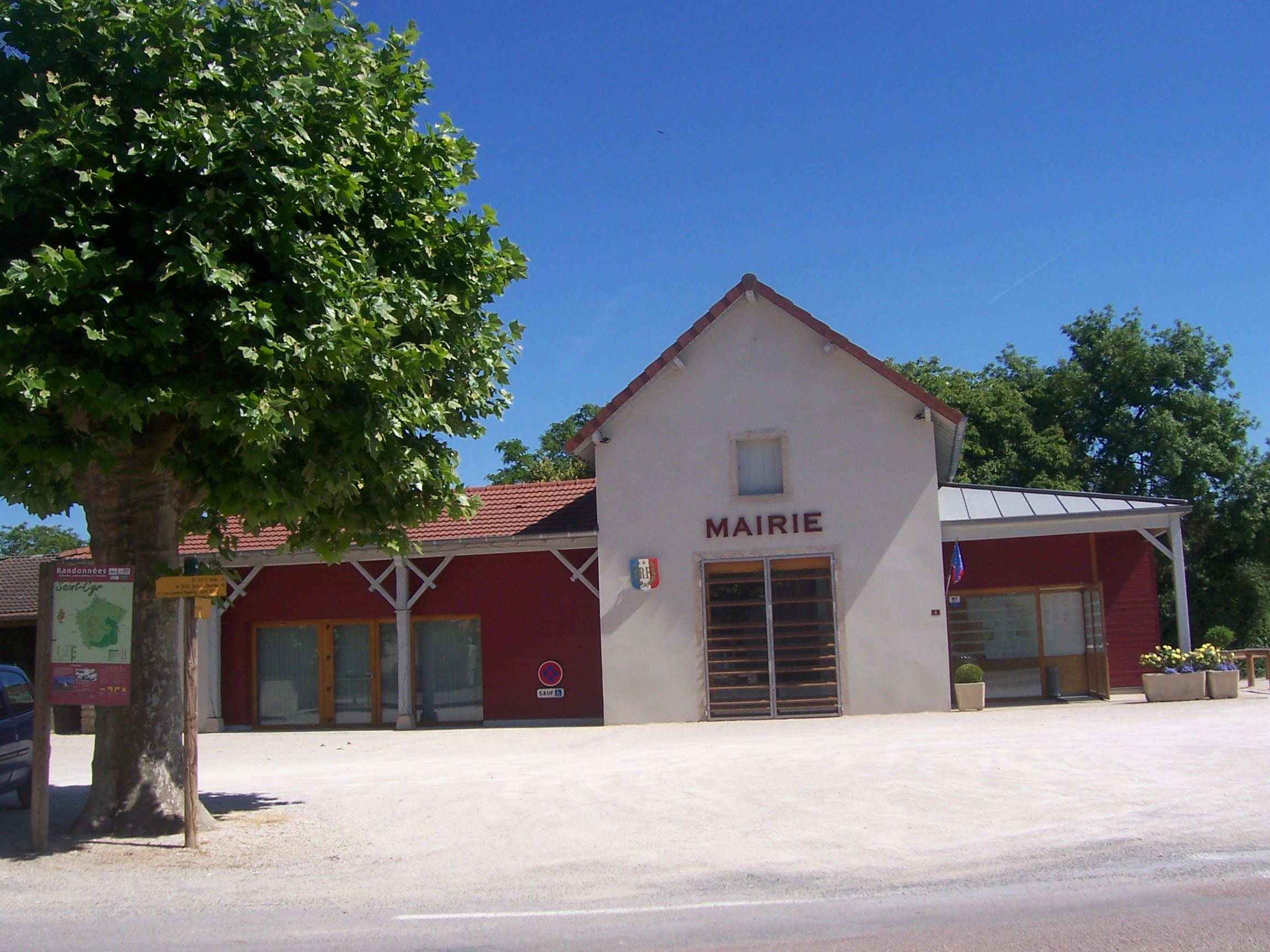
Town hall

== See also ==
- Communes of the Saône-et-Loire department
