= Saint-Martin-d'Auxy =

- Commune
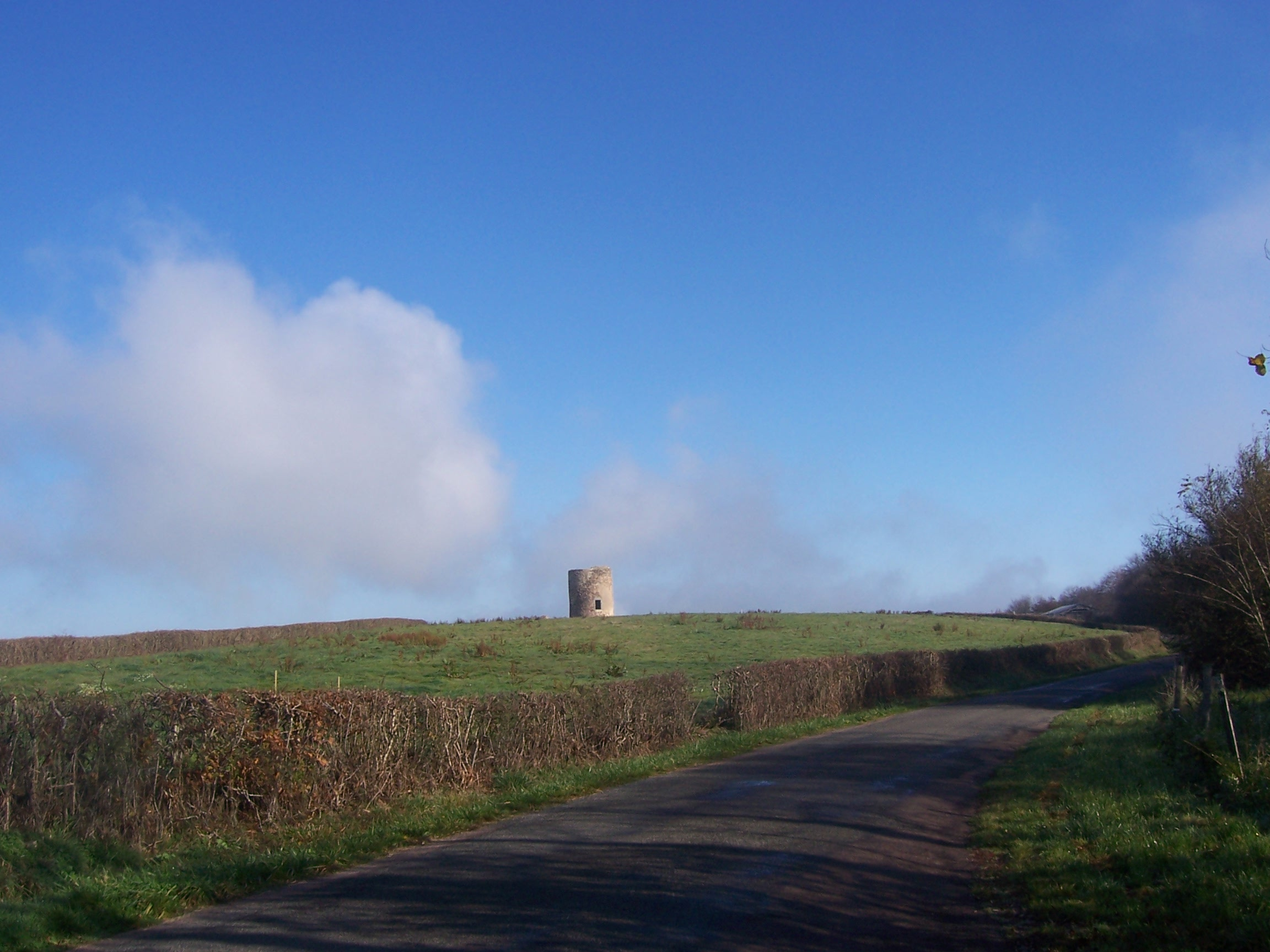
- Tower
- Location of Saint-Martin-d'Auxy
- Location within France Location within Bourgogne-Franche-Comté
- Coordinates: 46°43′34″N 4°33′07″E
- Country: France
- Region: Bourgogne-Franche-Comté
- Department: Saône-et-Loire
- Arrondissement: Chalon-sur-Saône
- Canton: Givry
- Area^{1}: 7.32 km^{2} (2.83 sq mi)
- Elevation: 480 m (1,570 ft)
- Highest elevation: 463 m (1,519 ft)
- Lowest elevation: 285 m (935 ft)
- Population (2023): 149
  - Density: 20.4/km^{2} (52.7/sq mi)
- Time zone: UTC+01:00 (CET)
  - Summer (DST): UTC+02:00 (CEST)
- INSEE/Postal code: 71449 /71390
- ^{1} French Land Register data, which excludes lakes, ponds, glaciers > 1 km^{2} (0.386 sq mi or 247 acres) and river estuaries.

Saint-Martin-d'Auxy is a commune in the Saône-et-Loire department in the region of Bourgogne-Franche-Comté in eastern France.

== See also ==
- Communes of the Saône-et-Loire department
