= Saint-Gengoux-le-National =

- Commune
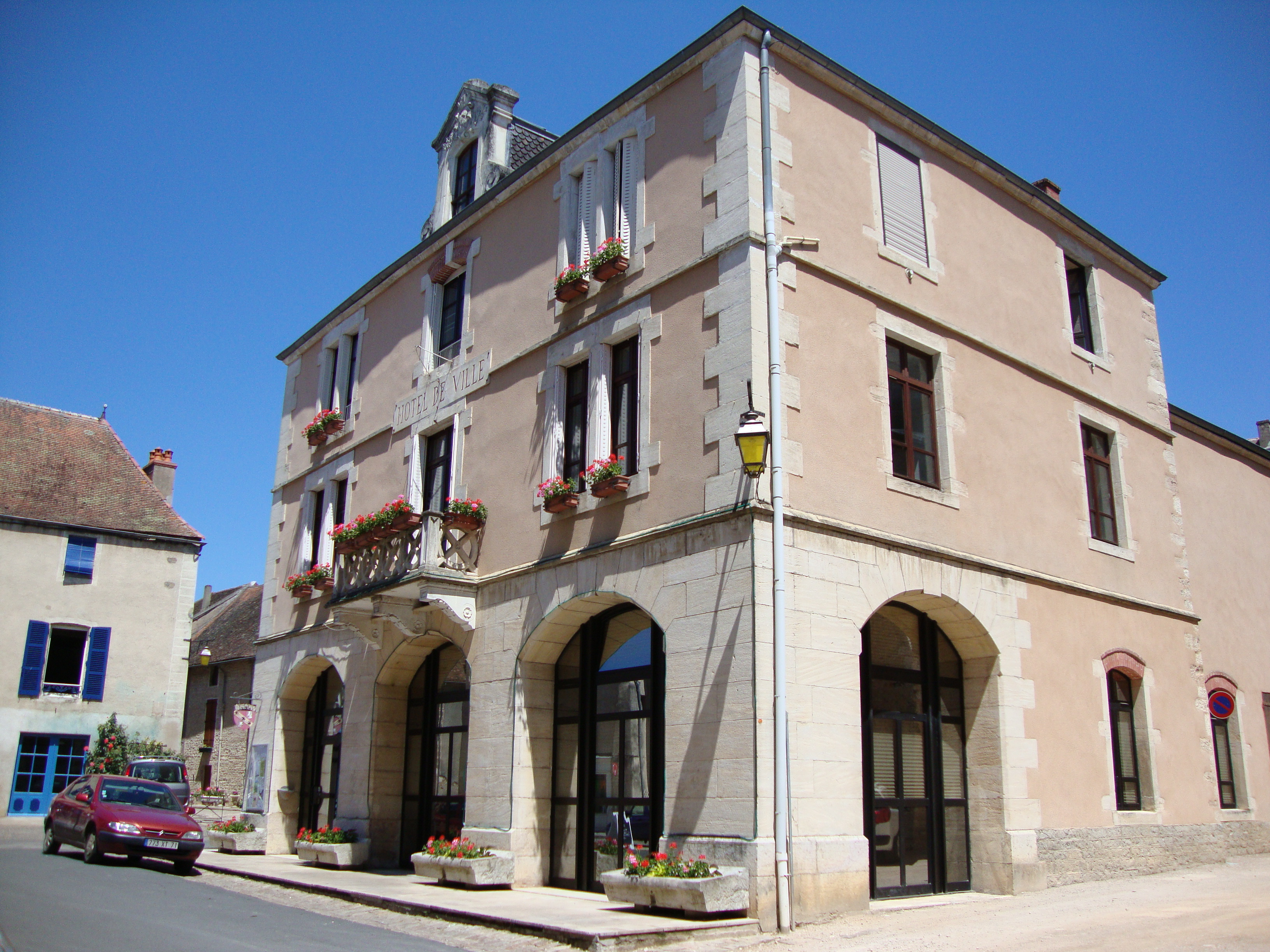
- The town hall in Saint-Gengoux-le-National

- Coat of arms
- Location of Saint-Gengoux-le-National
- Location within France Location within Bourgogne-Franche-Comté
- Coordinates: 46°36′53″N 4°39′49″E
- Country: France
- Region: Bourgogne-Franche-Comté
- Department: Saône-et-Loire
- Arrondissement: Chalon-sur-Saône
- Canton: Cluny

Government
  - Mayor (2020–2026): Didier Bordet
- Area^{1}: 9.36 km^{2} (3.61 sq mi)
- Elevation: 232 m (761 ft)
- Highest elevation: 390 m (1,280 ft)
- Lowest elevation: 193 m (633 ft)
- Population (2023): 1,046
  - Density: 112/km^{2} (289/sq mi)
- Time zone: UTC+01:00 (CET)
  - Summer (DST): UTC+02:00 (CEST)
- INSEE/Postal code: 71417 /71460
- ^{1} French Land Register data, which excludes lakes, ponds, glaciers > 1 km^{2} (0.386 sq mi or 247 acres) and river estuaries.

Saint-Gengoux-le-National (French pronunciation: [sɛ̃ ʒɑ̃ɡu l(ə) nɑsjɔnal]) is a commune in the Saône-et-Loire department in the region of Bourgogne-Franche-Comté in eastern France.

It was formerly known as Saint-Gengoux-le-Royal.

== History ==
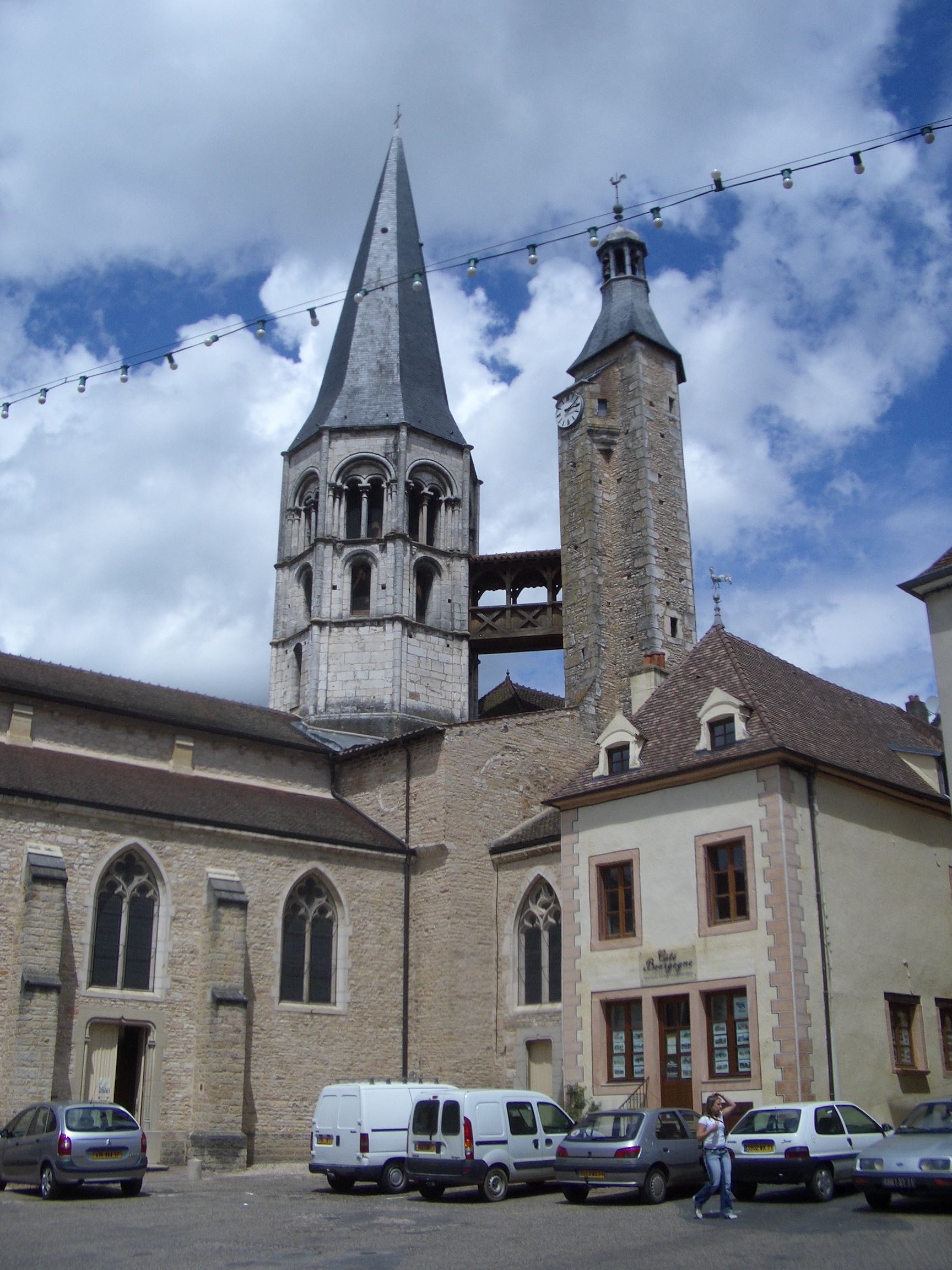
Church in Saint-Gengoux-le-National

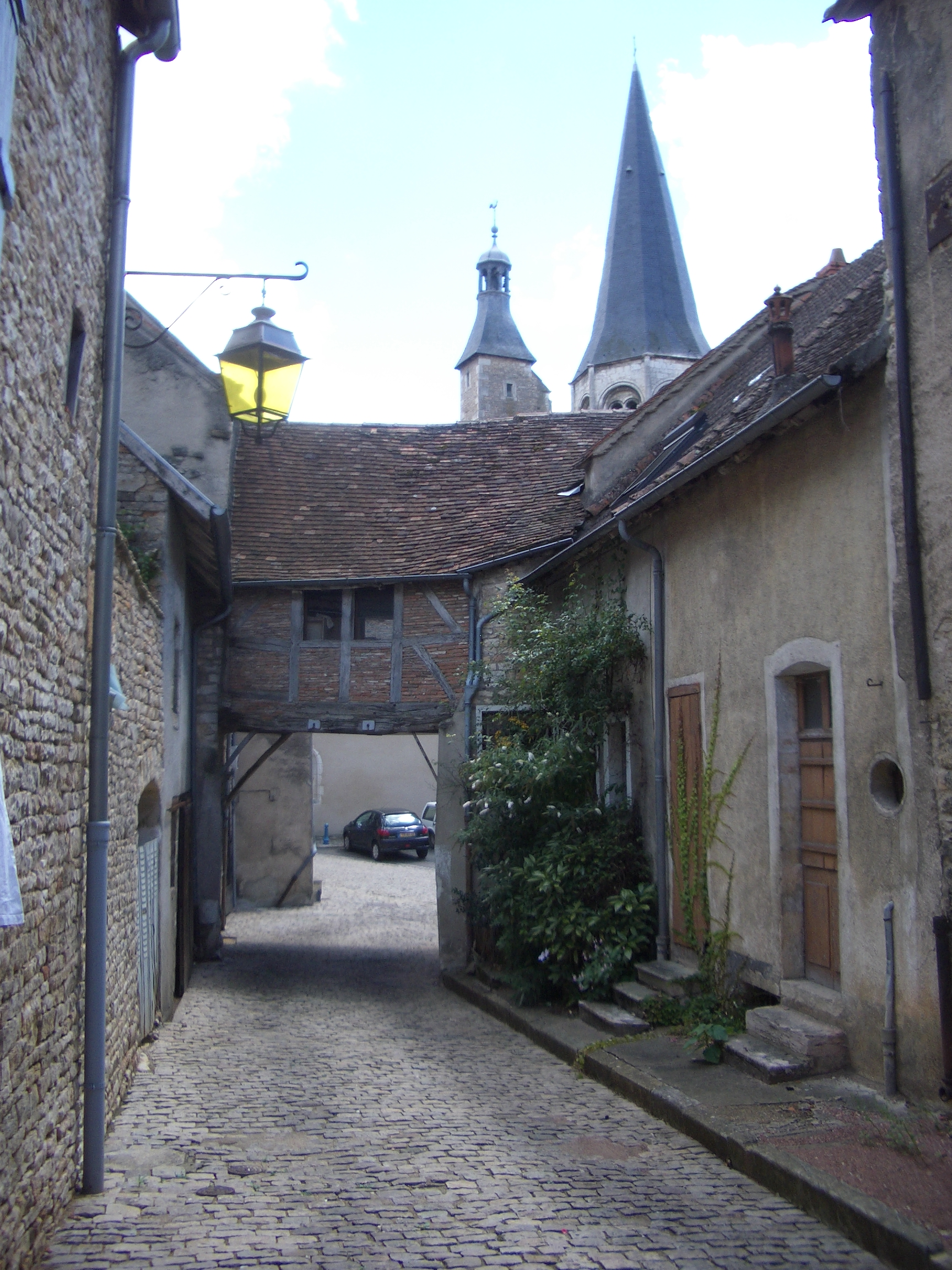
Historic house in Saint-Gengoux-le-National

In the 10th century, the church of Saint-Gengoux was given to the abbey of Cluny. In the 12th century, the abbot of Cluny requested king Louis VII install a lord of the manor with Saint-Gengoux in order to ensure the safety of the city.

At the revolution, Saint-Gengoux-le-Royal took the name of Saint-Gengoux-le-National. It reverted to Saint-Gengoux-le-Royal is 1834, Saint-Gengoux-le-National in 1848, Saint-Gengoux-le-Royal in 1852 before finally settling on Saint-Gengoux-le-National in 1881.

== Geography ==
The river Grosne forms part of the commune's south-eastern border.

== Notable buildings ==
The church was built in 1120 by the Benedictines of Cluny. It measures 41 m in length and 16 m wide. It was plundered several times and has been heavily restored. The most recent enhancement has been the replacement of the metal bridge between the towers with a wooden one, more in keeping with the Burgundian style. In 1802, three vaults contiguous to the church were destroyed to build a corn exchange on their site.

There are many historic properties from the sixteenth and seventeenth centuries.

== Transport ==
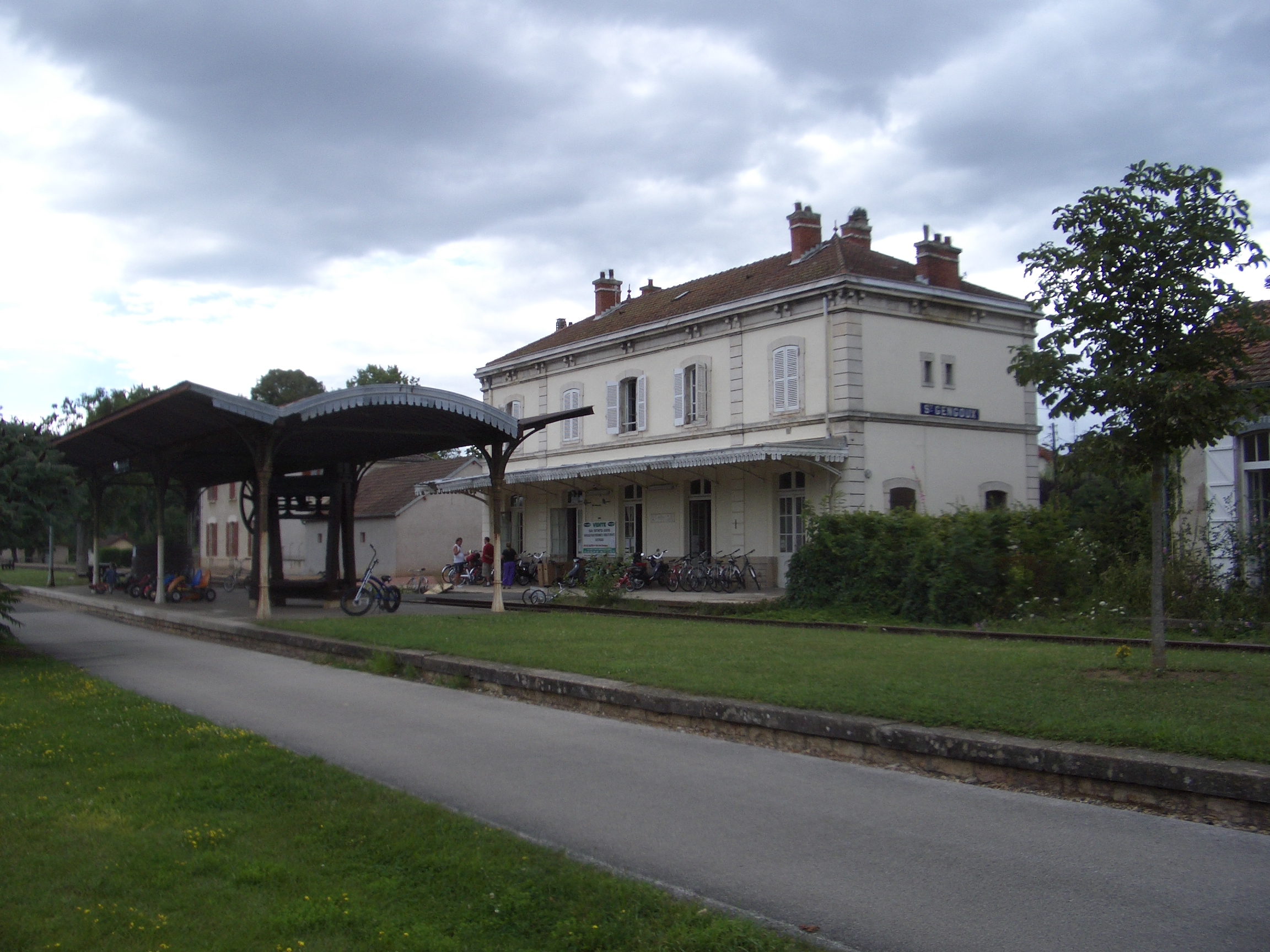
The railway station buildings in Saint-Gengoux-le-National

The railway station at Saint-Gengoux-le-National was opened in 1880 on the Chalon-sur-Saône to Mâcon railway line.

After the closure of the railway, in 1996 the 44 km of trackbed from Givry to Cluny has been paved and converted into a cycle route known as the Voie Verte. There are several locations along the route where cycles may be hired, including the station at Saint-Gengoux-le-National.

== See also ==
- Communes of the Saône-et-Loire department
