= Grosne (river) =

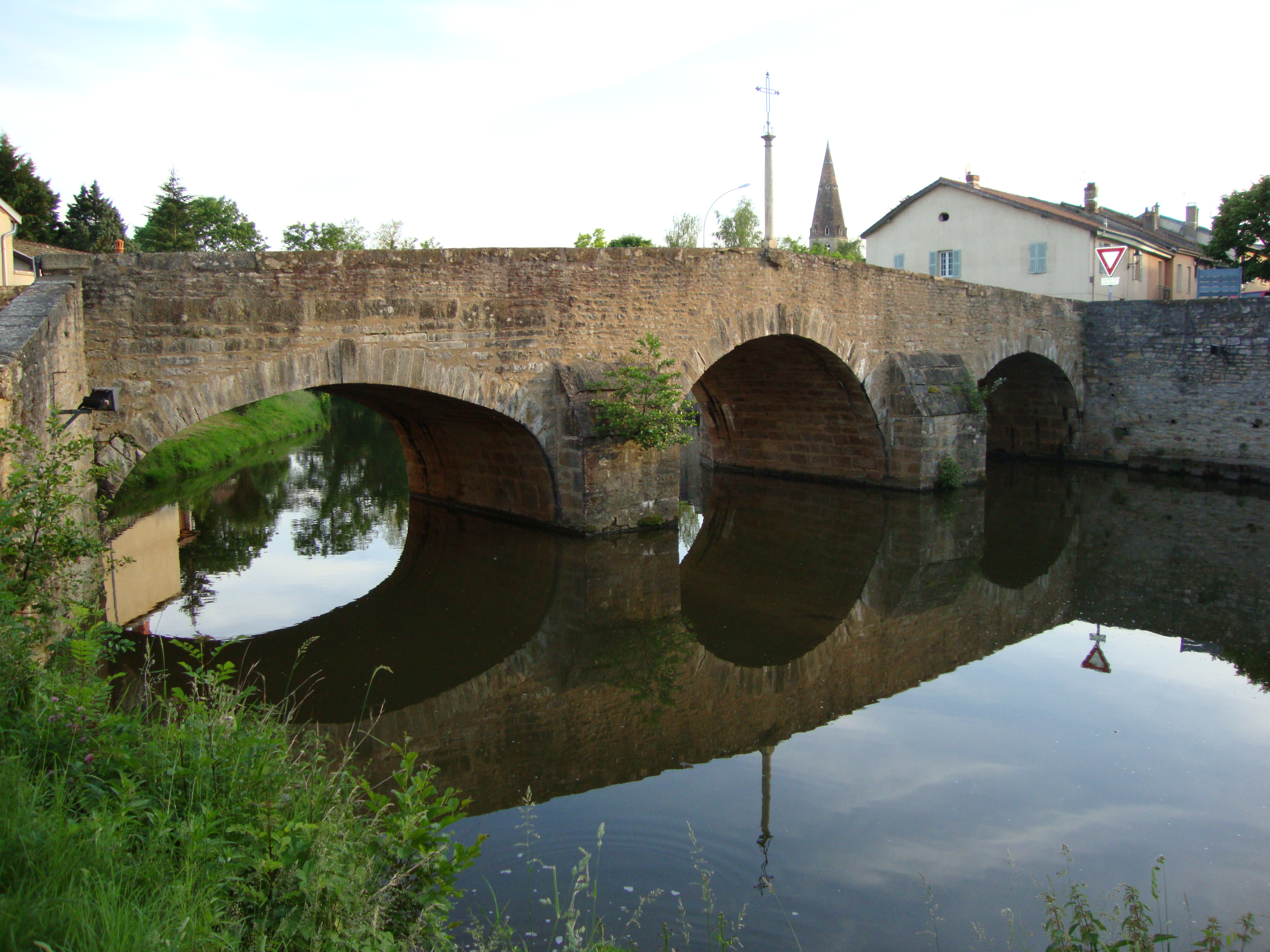
- The Grosne at Cluny

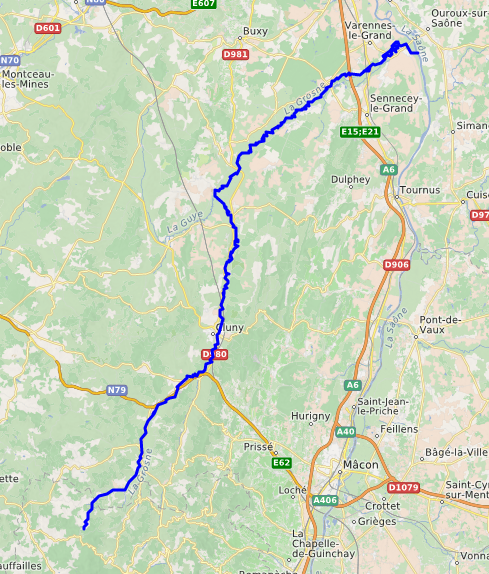

Location
- Country: France

Physical characteristics
- Source
  - location: Saint-Bonnet-des-Bruyères
  - coordinates: 46°14′52″N 04°28′37″E
  - elevation: 610 m (2,000 ft)
- Mouth
  - location: Saône
  - coordinates: 46°41′58″N 04°56′13″E
  - elevation: 170 m (560 ft)
- Length: 96.7 km (60.1 mi)
- Basin size: 1,000 km^{2} (390 sq mi)
- Discharge
  - average: 10 m^{3}/s (350 cu ft/s)

Basin features
- Progression: Saône→ Rhône→ Mediterranean Sea

The Grosne (French: la Grosne, French pronunciation: [ɡʁon]) is a 96.7-kilometre (60.1 mi) long river in the Rhône and Saône-et-Loire departments in central eastern France. Its source is near Saint-Bonnet-des-Bruyères. It flows generally north. It is a right tributary of the Saône into which it flows in Marnay. Its largest tributaries are the Guye and the Grison.

== Departments and communes along its course ==
This list is ordered from source to mouth:

- Rhône: Saint-Bonnet-des-Bruyères
- Saône-et-Loire: Saint-Pierre-le-Vieux, Saint-Léger-sous-la-Bussière, Trambly, Montagny-sur-Grosne, Brandon, Clermain, Mazille, Sainte-Cécile, Jalogny, Cluny, Cortambert, Lournand, Massilly, Bray, Taizé, Ameugny, Cormatin, Malay, Savigny-sur-Grosne, Saint-Gengoux-le-National, Sercy, Bresse-sur-Grosne, Santilly, La Chapelle-de-Bragny, Messey-sur-Grosne, Lalheue, Laives, Saint-Ambreuil, Beaumont-sur-Grosne, Saint-Cyr, Varennes-le-Grand, Marnay
