= Adolphe Déchenaud =

French painter

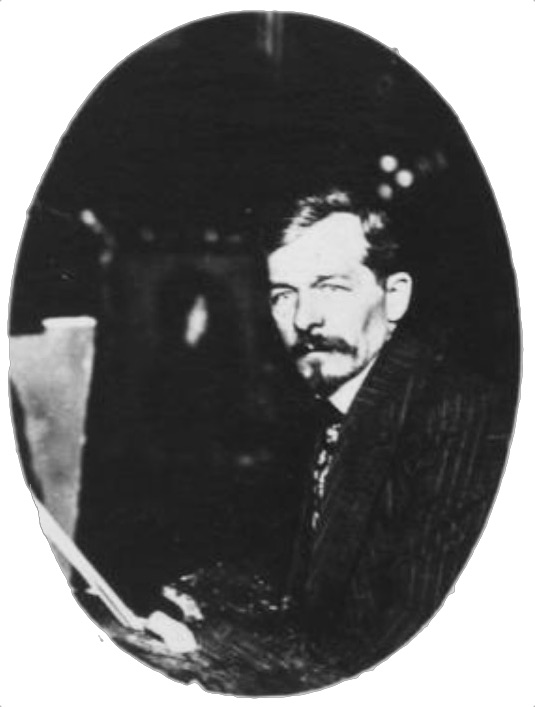
Adolphe Déchenaud, from the "Collection Félix Potin" (date unknown)

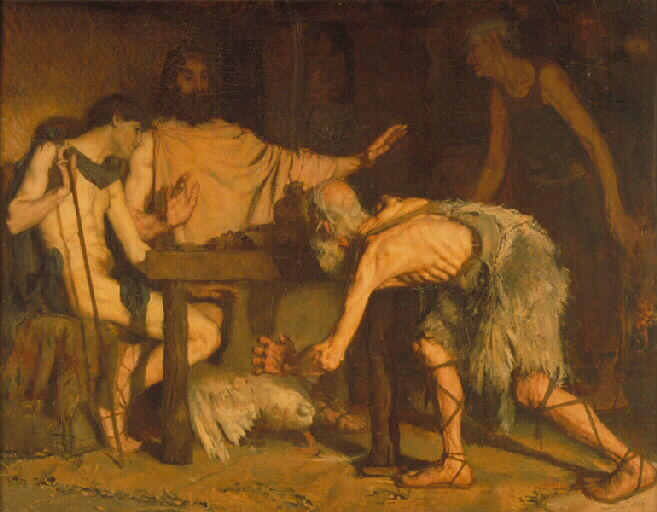
Philemon and Baucis

Adolphe Déchenaud (28 June 1868, Saint-Ambreuil – 27 December 1926, Neuilly-sur-Seine) was a French painter who specialized in Biblical/historical scenes and portraits.

== Biography ==
He was the son of a Parisian restaurateur, born while his mother was visiting her parents. She remained there for two years before bringing him back to Paris. At the age of fifteen, having noticed his artistic talent, his father enrolled him at the Académie Julian, where he studied with Jules Joseph Lefebvre, Gustave Boulanger and Jean-Joseph Benjamin-Constant.

In 1885, he competed for entry to the École des Beaux-arts, but was obliged to perform military service in 1886. After a year with the 13th Infantry Regiment in Nevers, he returned to the Académie.

He achieved second-place in the Prix de Rome competition in 1891 for his depiction of Philemon and Baucis. Three years later, he shared the Grand Prize with Auguste Leroux for his version of Judith beheading Holofernes. That same year, he went to the Villa Médicis and remained there until 1898.

During this time, he painted the portraits of several of his fellow residents who would later become well-known, including André Devambez, François-Léon Sicard and Emmanuel Pontremoli. His first exhibition at the Salon was in 1899. He only received an honorable mention, but this was followed by medals in 1900 and 1901. At the Salon of 1913, he received the Medal of Honor. He also became a teacher at the Académie.

In 1914, at the beginning of World War I, he produced one of his most familiar paintings; Le comité des forges (the Foundry Committee), a tableau of the twenty-five most powerful French industrialists. After the war, he was elected a to succeed Raphaël Collin in Seat#11 at the Académie des Beaux-Arts. Upon his death, he was succeeded by Lucien Simon. He is interred in a mausoleum in Nanton, which he had made his second home.
