= Geostock =

French engineering company

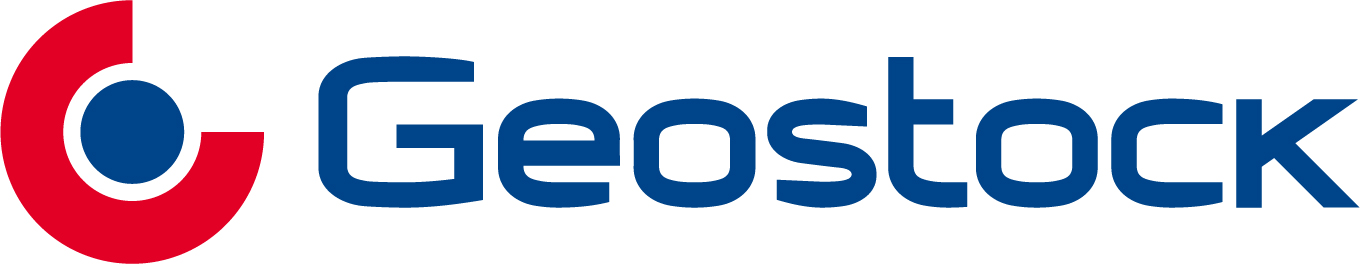
- Industry: Consulting, engineering, construction, operation
- Founded: September 23, 1965
- Founder: BP, Shell, Total, Elf
- Headquarters: Rueil-Malmaison, France
- Products: Hydrogen, compressed air, hydrocarbons
- Revenue: EUR 88,3 million (2022)
- Number of employees: 457
- Subsidiaries: Geostock SAS, UGS, Geostock Sandia, Geostock de Mexico
- Website: www.geostockgroup.com

Geostock is a French engineering company founded in 1965, and part of the Vinci Construction group. It specializes in underground energy storage (liquid, liquefied and gaseous hydrocarbons, hydrogen, compressed air, etc.). The company also has subsidiaries outside France.

== History ==
=== Foundation ===
Following the effects of the 1956 Suez Canal crisis and the oil shocks, the main French refiners, supported by the government, reacted to the geopolitical difficulties. French companies BP France and Shell joined forces and founded the "Société Française de Stockage Géologique Geostock" on September 23, 1965. They were soon joined by ELF Union and Total.

Geostock began its activity by developing its first salt cavern site, Géosel, in Manosque. This underground storage complex currently contains 30 salt caverns. Since 1969, Geostock has been responsible for the entire operation of this storage facility and the two pipelines on behalf of Géosel.

In 1971, at Lavéra, Geostock continued its experience at Géogaz, a site specialized in mined caverns and LPG storage.

=== Expansion ===
Geostock expanded in the 1970s by participating in the design, construction and operation of various underground storage sites, as well as through acquisitions of companies in the same field of activity.

In 1972, Géomines was born, a diesel storage facility in a former iron ore mine at May-sur-Orne (near Caen, Normandy), which was however decommissioned in 1993. The idea was to convert an old abandoned mine into a geological storage facility, using existing artificial voids, galleries or mining chambers.

Loenhout marks the start of Geostock's international activities. It is the first geophysical campaign for natural gas storage in a porous medium. Geostock designs an aquifer in which natural gas is stored, in 1975.

In 1977, the Geovexin site was opened in Gargenville, near Paris. It is a mined-cavity propane storage site. A series of galleries dug for heavy fuel oil storage was converted into a propane reservoir. The site was closed in 2012 after 30 years of operation. In the same year, Geostock built a mined-cavity propane storage facility at Donges.

In 1984, Géogaz expanded to include the storage of commercial and chemical butane in mined caverns.

In 1986, a salt cavern butane storage facility was opened in Mohammedia, Morocco, on behalf of SOMAS. A butane cavity was added in 2013.

In 1989, Geostock and Gaz de France joined forces to design a salt cavern storage facility for natural gas in Manosque, France. The Géométhane site was commissioned in 1993.

In 1996, Butagaz was born in Sennecy-le-Grand, France. This is a propane storage facility in a mined cavern. A joint venture, Gester, was set up in 1997 with Simecsol for an ancillary activity, the remediation of polluted soil.

In 1999, the acquisition of the German company Untergrundspeicher und Geotechnologie Systeme (UGS) doubled sales. Underground gas storage is now the predominant activity, to the detriment of underground oil storage, the original business.

In 2011, Vinci bought out the 40% stake held by the Total oil group, raising its stake in the company to 90%.

In 2014, Geostock designed a site for the storage of liquid hydrocarbons in mined caverns in Jurong, Singapore. This site is still in operation by the company.

In 2021, VINCI increased its stake in Geostock to 100%, making it a subsidiary of VINCI Construction Grands Projets.

In 2021, Geostock led the European Hystories project. This is a scientific research project into the possibilities of storing hydrogen in porous media, i.e. in depleted gas or oil fields, as well as in existing aquifers. This project has brought together a group of public (European universities, research institutes) and private (engineering firms, industrialists and operators of energy storage sites) players, to develop technical solutions and produce socio-economic analyses of the possibilities of this type of geological storage. The project, funded by the European Union, ran from January 1, 2021, to June 30, 2023.

== Chairpersons ==
- 1965–1975: Etienne Schlumberger
- 1975–1985: André Clerc-Renaud
- 1985–1992: Claude Tourolle
- 1992–2007: René Le Marchand
- 2007–2017: Jean-Michel Noé
- 2017–2025: Pascal Baylocq
