= Nanto =

Nanto may refer to:

== Places ==
- Nanto, Veneto, a former municipality in Italy
- Nantō, Mie, a town in Japan
- Nanto, Toyama (南砺), a city in Japan
- Nanto (南都), an historical synonym for Nara, Nara, Japan

== Other uses ==
- Nanto Bank, a Japanese regional bank headquartered in Nara Prefecture
- Nanto Rokushū, six early Japanese Buddhist schools
- Nanto Seiken (南斗聖拳 - "Sacred Fist of the South Dipper"), a fictional martial arts style
- Nanto Shichi Daiji (南都七大寺), The Seven Great Temples of Nanto
- Dipper (Chinese constellation) 南斗 (Nanto), one of the twenty-eight mansions of the Chinese constellations

== See also ==
- Nanto-Bordelaise Company, a French company formed in 1839
- Nantou City, a city in Taiwan
- Nantou County, a county in Taiwan
- Nanton (disambiguation)
- Nantong
