= Gigny =

Gigny may refer to the following communes in France:

- Gigny, Jura, in the Jura department
- Gigny, Yonne, in the Yonne department
- Gigny-Bussy, in the Marne department
- Gigny-sur-Saône, in the Saône-et-Loire department
