= Martailly-lès-Brancion =

- Commune
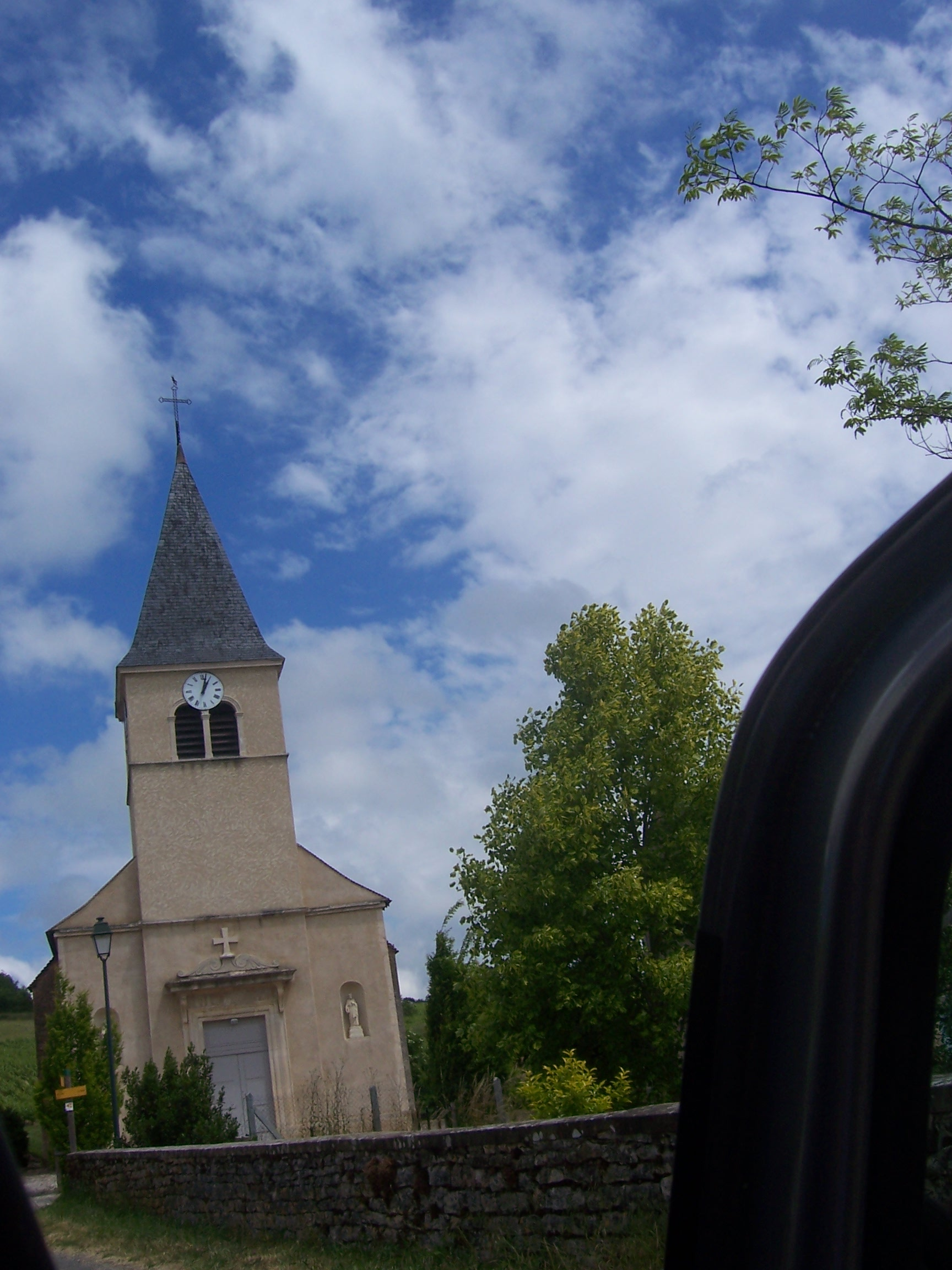
- The church in Martailly-lès-Brancion

- Coat of arms
- Location of Martailly-lès-Brancion
- Location within France Location within Bourgogne-Franche-Comté
- Coordinates: 46°31′59″N 4°48′11″E
- Country: France
- Region: Bourgogne-Franche-Comté
- Department: Saône-et-Loire
- Arrondissement: Mâcon
- Canton: Tournus
- Area^{1}: 8.85 km^{2} (3.42 sq mi)
- Elevation: 250 m (820 ft)
- Highest elevation: 476 m (1,562 ft)
- Lowest elevation: 214 m (702 ft)
- Population (2023): 123
  - Density: 13.9/km^{2} (36.0/sq mi)
- Time zone: UTC+01:00 (CET)
  - Summer (DST): UTC+02:00 (CEST)
- INSEE/Postal code: 71284 /71700
- ^{1} French Land Register data, which excludes lakes, ponds, glaciers > 1 km^{2} (0.386 sq mi or 247 acres) and river estuaries.

Martailly-lès-Brancion (French pronunciation: [maʁtaji lɛ bʁɑ̃sjɔ̃]) is a commune in the Saône-et-Loire department in the region of Bourgogne-Franche-Comté in eastern France.

== Gallery ==
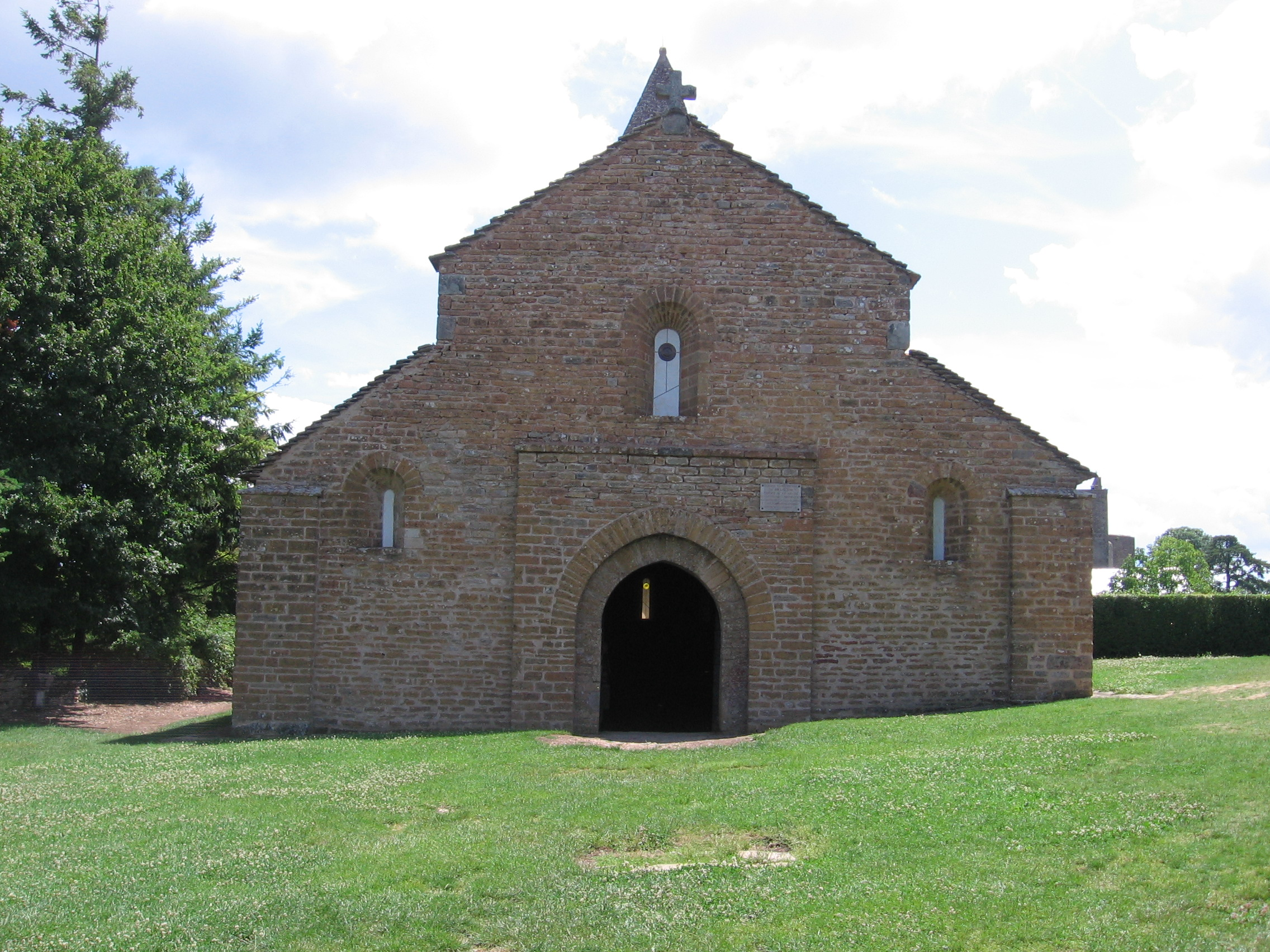
Saint-Peter of Brancion church, built during the 12th century.

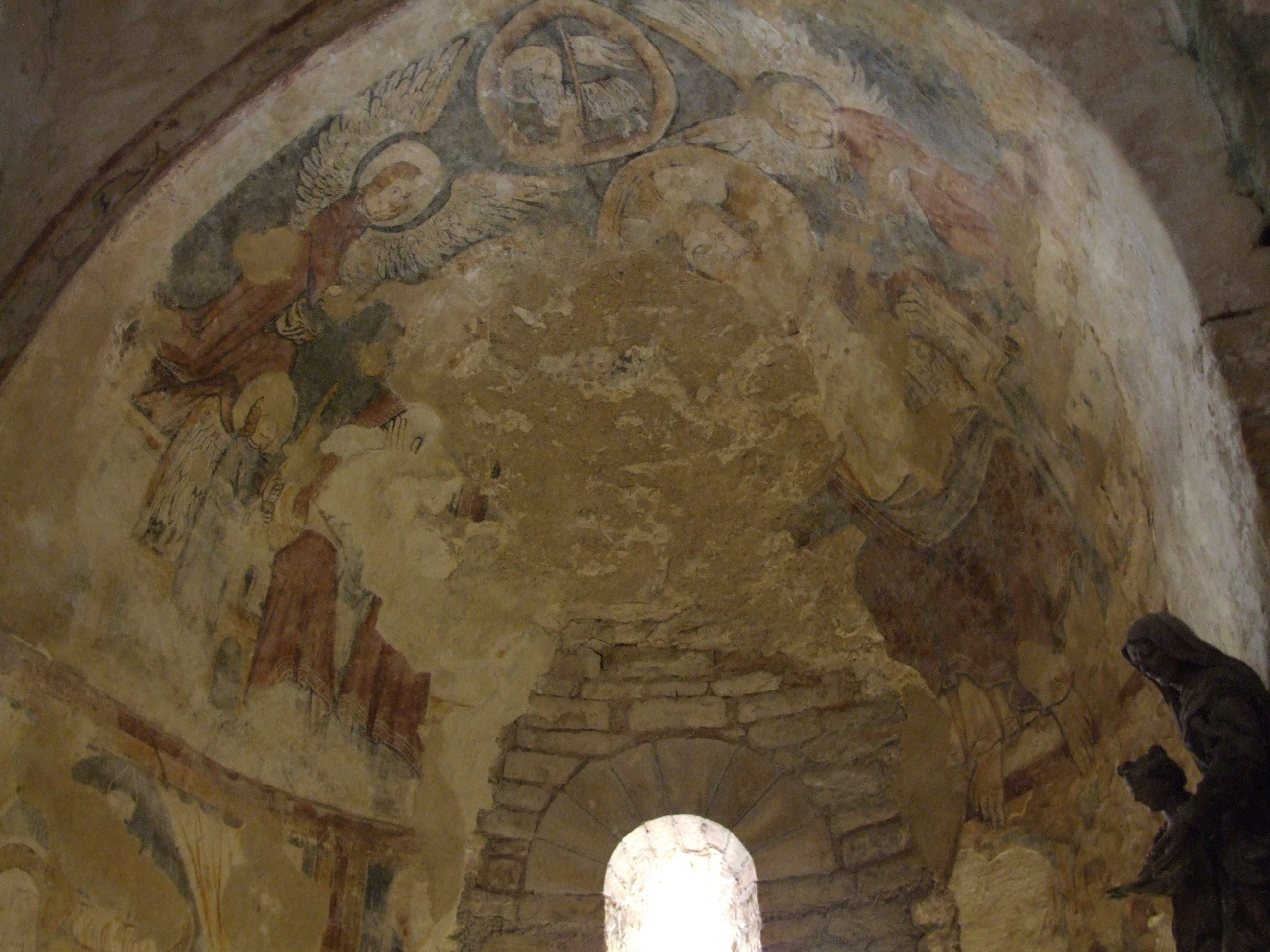
Église Saint-Pierre de Brancion.
Murals from the Middle Ages in the Saint-Peter of Brancion church.

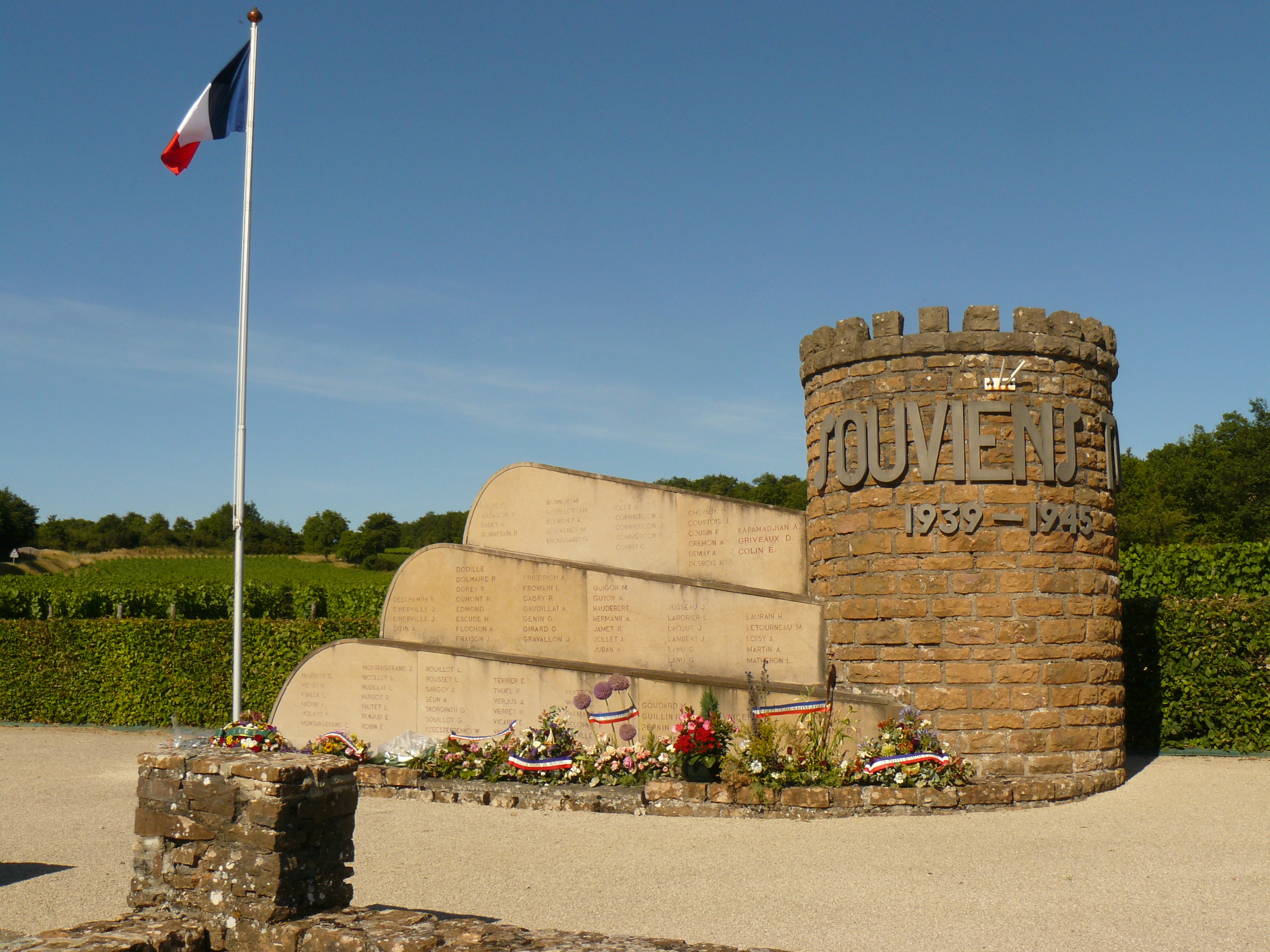
Memorial to the French Resistance and maquis during the Second World War.

== See also ==
- Communes of the Saône-et-Loire department
