= Le Villars =

- Commune
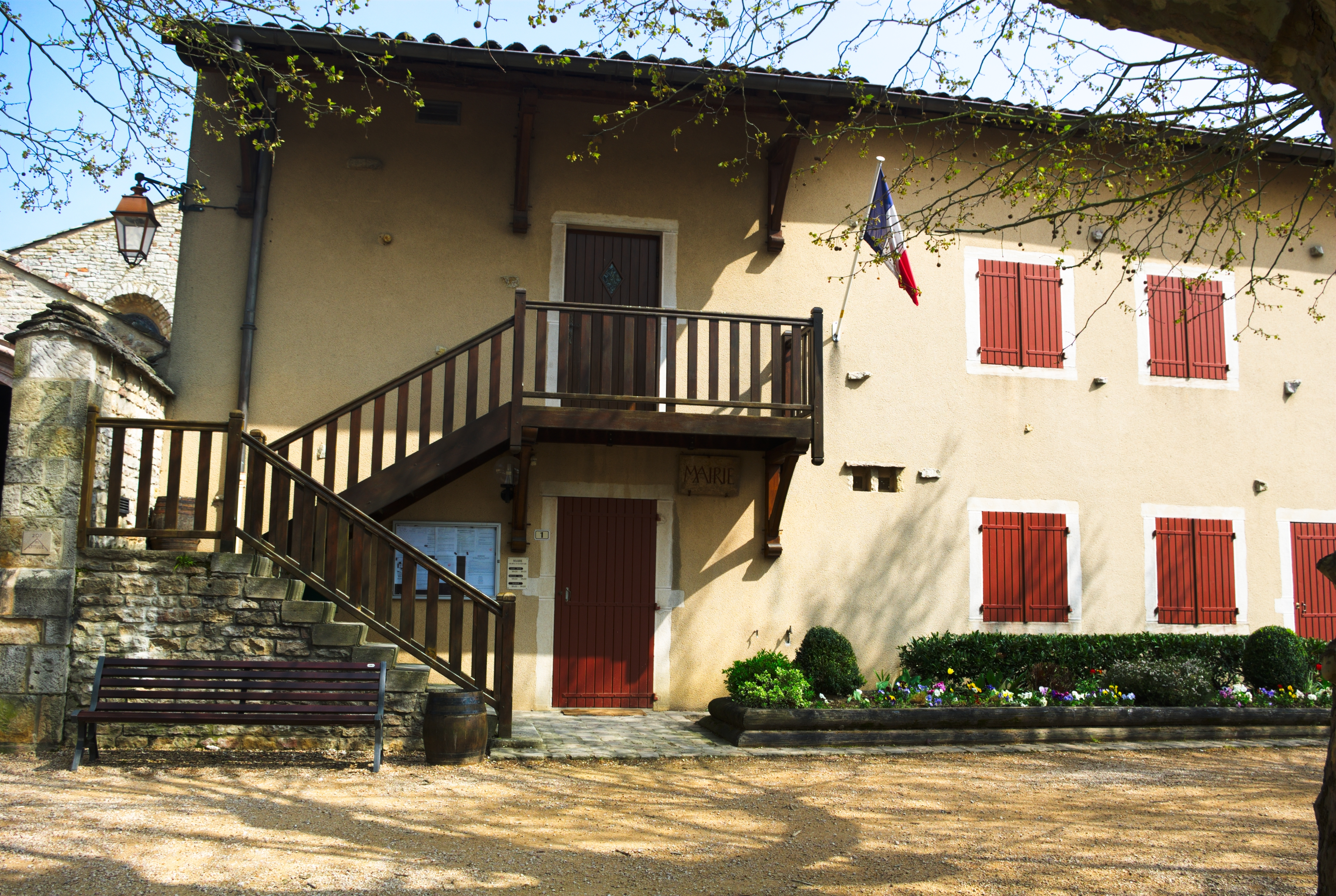
- Town hall
- Location of Le Villars
- Location within France Location within Bourgogne-Franche-Comté
- Coordinates: 46°31′55″N 4°55′54″E
- Country: France
- Region: Bourgogne-Franche-Comté
- Department: Saône-et-Loire
- Arrondissement: Mâcon
- Canton: Tournus
- Area^{1}: 5.58 km^{2} (2.15 sq mi)
- Elevation: 296 m (971 ft)
- Highest elevation: 270 m (890 ft)
- Lowest elevation: 167 m (548 ft)
- Population (2023): 274
  - Density: 49.1/km^{2} (127/sq mi)
- Time zone: UTC+01:00 (CET)
  - Summer (DST): UTC+02:00 (CEST)
- INSEE/Postal code: 71576 /71700
- ^{1} French Land Register data, which excludes lakes, ponds, glaciers > 1 km^{2} (0.386 sq mi or 247 acres) and river estuaries.

Le Villars is a commune in the Saône-et-Loire department in the region of Bourgogne-Franche-Comté in eastern France.

== Notable people ==
- French-born composer Edgard Varèse lived there in his youth.

== See also ==
- Communes of the Saône-et-Loire department
