= La Chapelle-de-Bragny =

- Commune
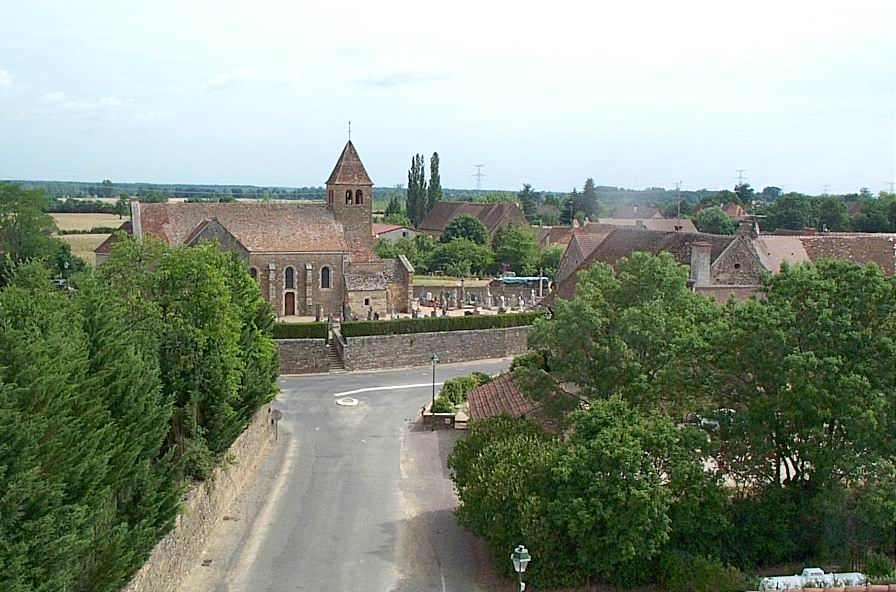
- The church and surroundings in La Chapelle-de-Bragny
- Location of La Chapelle-de-Bragny
- Location within France Location within Bourgogne-Franche-Comté
- Coordinates: 46°38′03″N 4°46′01″E
- Country: France
- Region: Bourgogne-Franche-Comté
- Department: Saône-et-Loire
- Arrondissement: Chalon-sur-Saône
- Canton: Tournus
- Intercommunality: Entre Saône et Grosne
- Area^{1}: 15.87 km^{2} (6.13 sq mi)
- Elevation: 183 m (600 ft)
- Highest elevation: 233 m (764 ft)
- Lowest elevation: 183 m (600 ft)
- Population (2023): 241
  - Density: 15.2/km^{2} (39.3/sq mi)
- Time zone: UTC+01:00 (CET)
  - Summer (DST): UTC+02:00 (CEST)
- INSEE/Postal code: 71089 /71240
- ^{1} French Land Register data, which excludes lakes, ponds, glaciers > 1 km^{2} (0.386 sq mi or 247 acres) and river estuaries.

La Chapelle-de-Bragny (French pronunciation: [la ʃapɛl də bʁaɲi]) is a commune in the Saône-et-Loire department in the region of Bourgogne-Franche-Comté in eastern France.

== Geography ==
The river Grosne forms the commune's north-western border.

== See also ==
- Communes of the Saône-et-Loire department
