= Boyer, Saône-et-Loire =

Boyer
- Commune
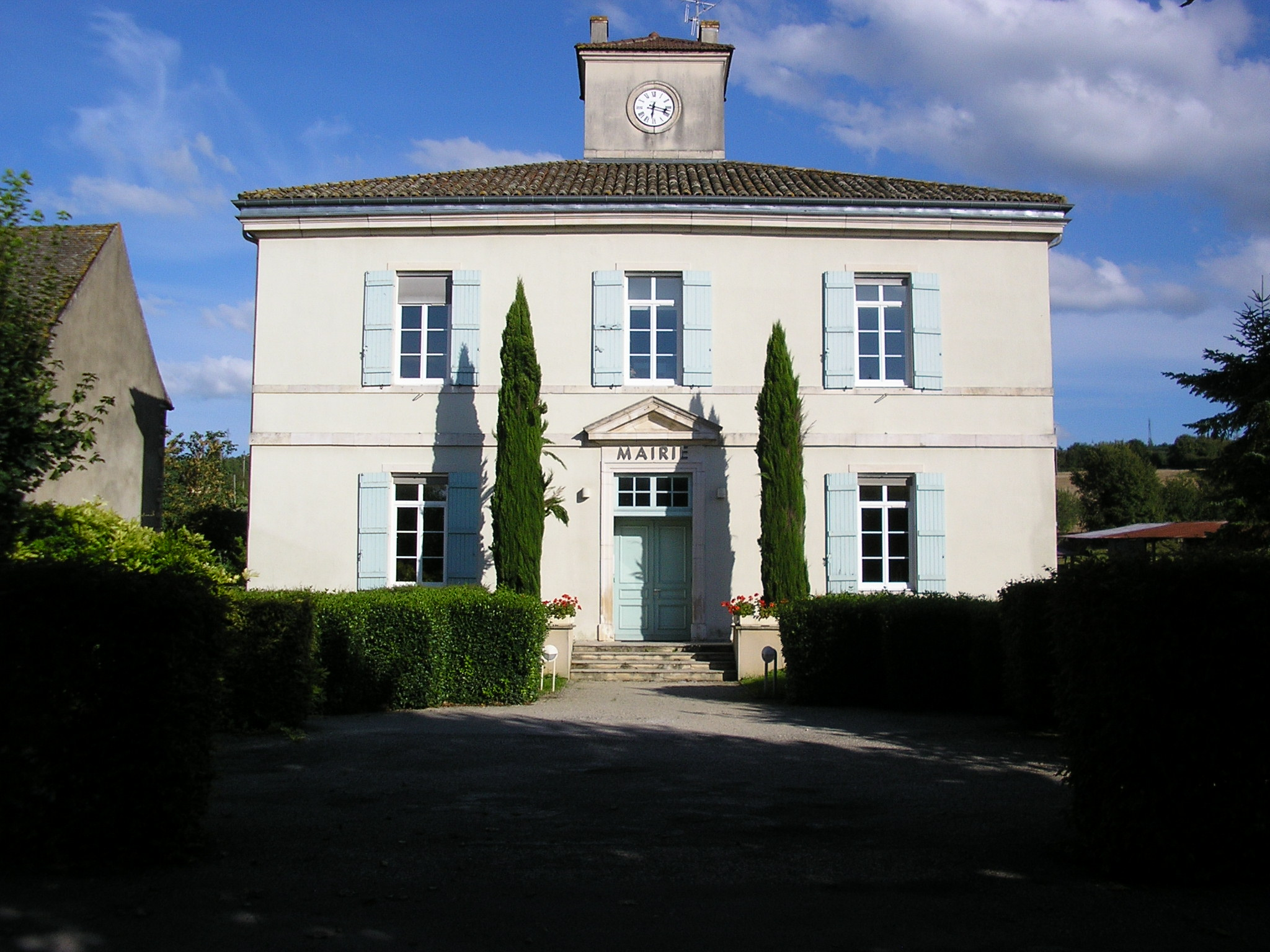
- Town hall
- Location of Boyer
- Location within France Location within Bourgogne-Franche-Comté
- Coordinates: 46°35′34″N 4°53′09″E
- Country: France
- Region: Bourgogne-Franche-Comté
- Department: Saône-et-Loire
- Arrondissement: Chalon-sur-Saône
- Canton: Tournus
- Intercommunality: Entre Saône et Grosne

Government
  - Mayor (2020–2026): Jean-Paul Bontemps
- Area^{1}: 16.93 km^{2} (6.54 sq mi)
- Elevation: 260 m (850 ft)
- Highest elevation: 305 m (1,001 ft)
- Lowest elevation: 169 m (554 ft)
- Population (2023): 725
  - Density: 42.8/km^{2} (111/sq mi)
- Time zone: UTC+01:00 (CET)
  - Summer (DST): UTC+02:00 (CEST)
- INSEE/Postal code: 71052 /71700
- ^{1} French Land Register data, which excludes lakes, ponds, glaciers > 1 km^{2} (0.386 sq mi or 247 acres) and river estuaries.

Boyer (French pronunciation: [bwaje]) is a commune in the Saône-et-Loire department in the region of Bourgogne-Franche-Comté in eastern France.

== See also ==
- Communes of the Saône-et-Loire department
