= Montceaux-Ragny =

- Commune
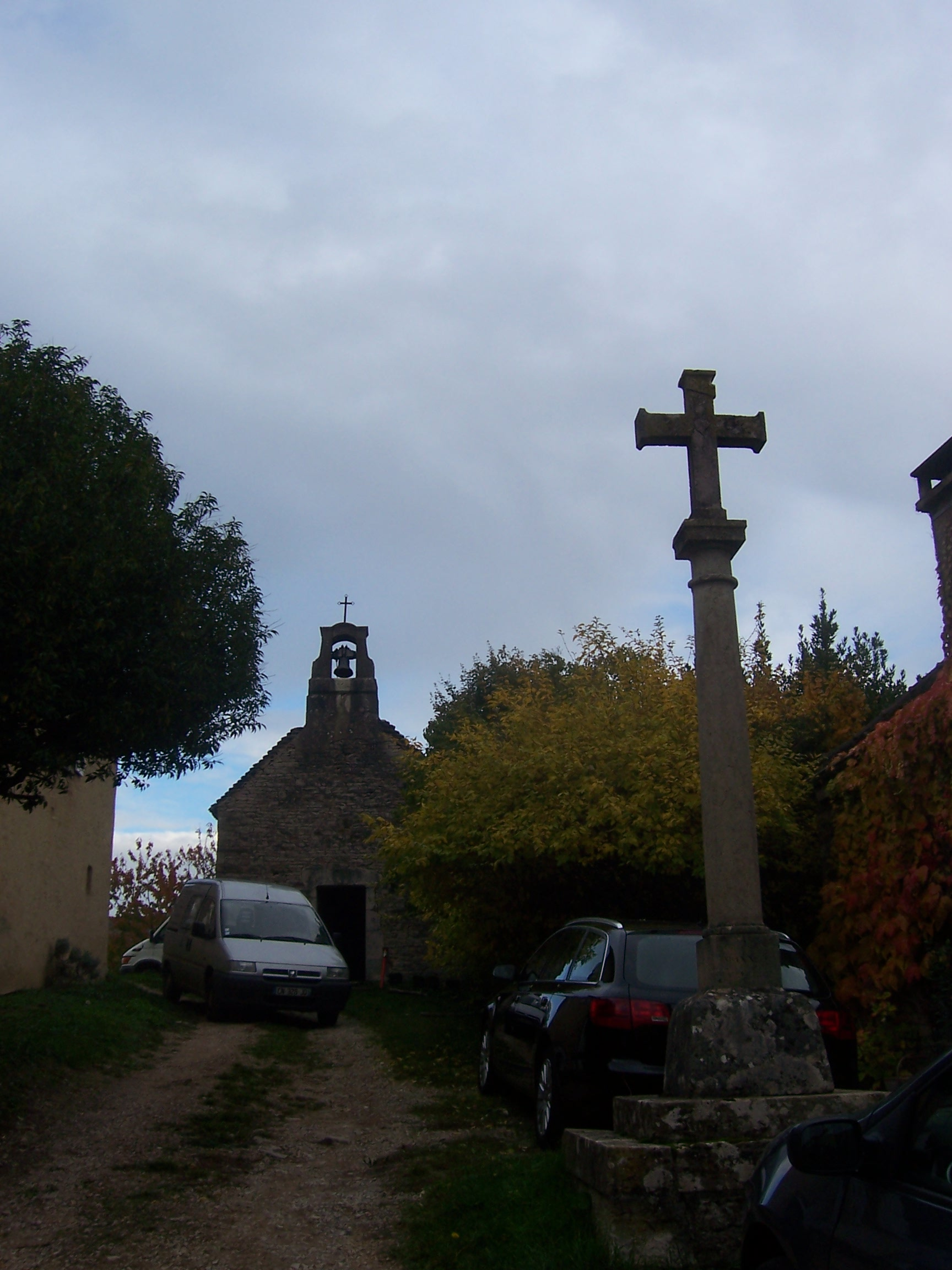
- The church and surroundings in Montceaux-Ragny
- Location of Montceaux-Ragny
- Location within France Location within Bourgogne-Franche-Comté
- Coordinates: 46°37′18″N 4°50′38″E
- Country: France
- Region: Bourgogne-Franche-Comté
- Department: Saône-et-Loire
- Arrondissement: Chalon-sur-Saône
- Canton: Tournus
- Intercommunality: Entre Saône et Grosne

Government
  - Mayor (2020–2026): Christian Dugue
- Area^{1}: 2.53 km^{2} (0.98 sq mi)
- Elevation: 275 m (902 ft)
- Highest elevation: 425 m (1,394 ft)
- Lowest elevation: 245 m (804 ft)
- Population (2023): 35
  - Density: 14/km^{2} (36/sq mi)
- Time zone: UTC+01:00 (CET)
  - Summer (DST): UTC+02:00 (CEST)
- INSEE/Postal code: 71308 /71240
- ^{1} French Land Register data, which excludes lakes, ponds, glaciers > 1 km^{2} (0.386 sq mi or 247 acres) and river estuaries.

Montceaux-Ragny (French pronunciation: [mɔ̃so ʁaɲi]) is a commune in the Saône-et-Loire department in the region of Bourgogne-Franche-Comté in eastern France.

== See also ==
- Communes of the Saône-et-Loire department
