= Nanton =

Nanton can refer to:

== Places ==
- Nanton, Alberta, a town in the province of Alberta, Canada
- Nanton, Saône-et-Loire, a commune in the region of Bourgogne, France
- Nanton, Ghana a town in Ghana

== People ==
- Philip Nanton (born 1947), Vincentian writer, poet and spoken-word performer
- Sampson Nanton (born 1977), Trinidad and Tobago journalist
- Tricky Sam Nanton (1904–1946), American trombonist
- Ann Saunderson (née Ann Nanton, 1967), British musician
