= Champagny-sous-Uxelles =

- Commune
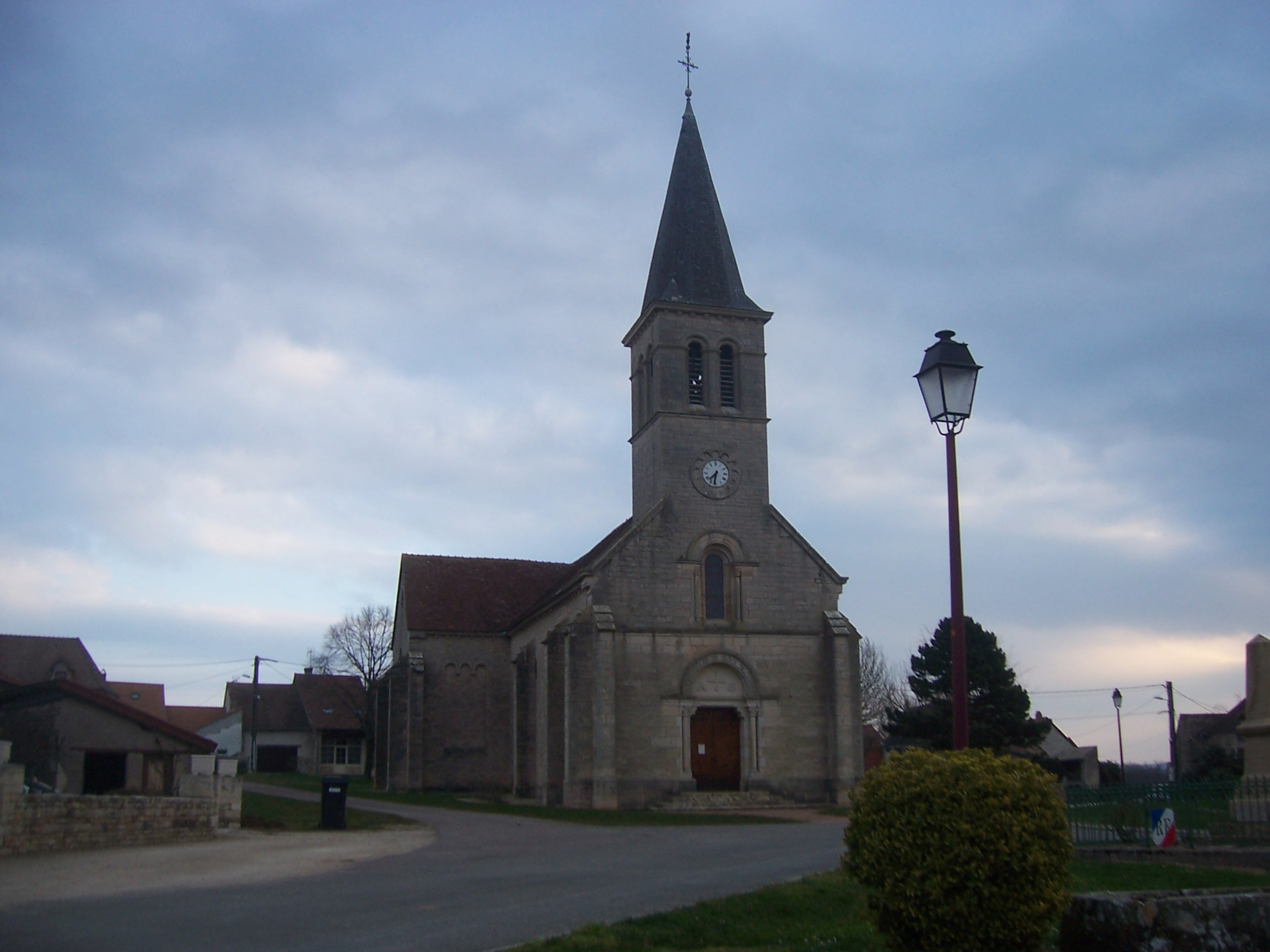
- The church in Champagny-sous-Uxelles

- Coat of arms
- Location of Champagny-sous-Uxelles
- Location within France Location within Bourgogne-Franche-Comté
- Coordinates: 46°34′52″N 4°44′37″E
- Country: France
- Region: Bourgogne-Franche-Comté
- Department: Saône-et-Loire
- Arrondissement: Chalon-sur-Saône
- Canton: Tournus
- Intercommunality: Entre Saône et Grosne
- Area^{1}: 5.05 km^{2} (1.95 sq mi)
- Elevation: 360 m (1,180 ft)
- Highest elevation: 287 m (942 ft)
- Lowest elevation: 199 m (653 ft)
- Population (2023): 82
  - Density: 16/km^{2} (42/sq mi)
- Time zone: UTC+01:00 (CET)
  - Summer (DST): UTC+02:00 (CEST)
- INSEE/Postal code: 71080 /71460
- ^{1} French Land Register data, which excludes lakes, ponds, glaciers > 1 km^{2} (0.386 sq mi or 247 acres) and river estuaries.

Champagny-sous-Uxelles is a commune in the Saône-et-Loire department in the region of Bourgogne-Franche-Comté in eastern France.

== See also ==
- Communes of the Saône-et-Loire department
