= Lacrost =

- Commune
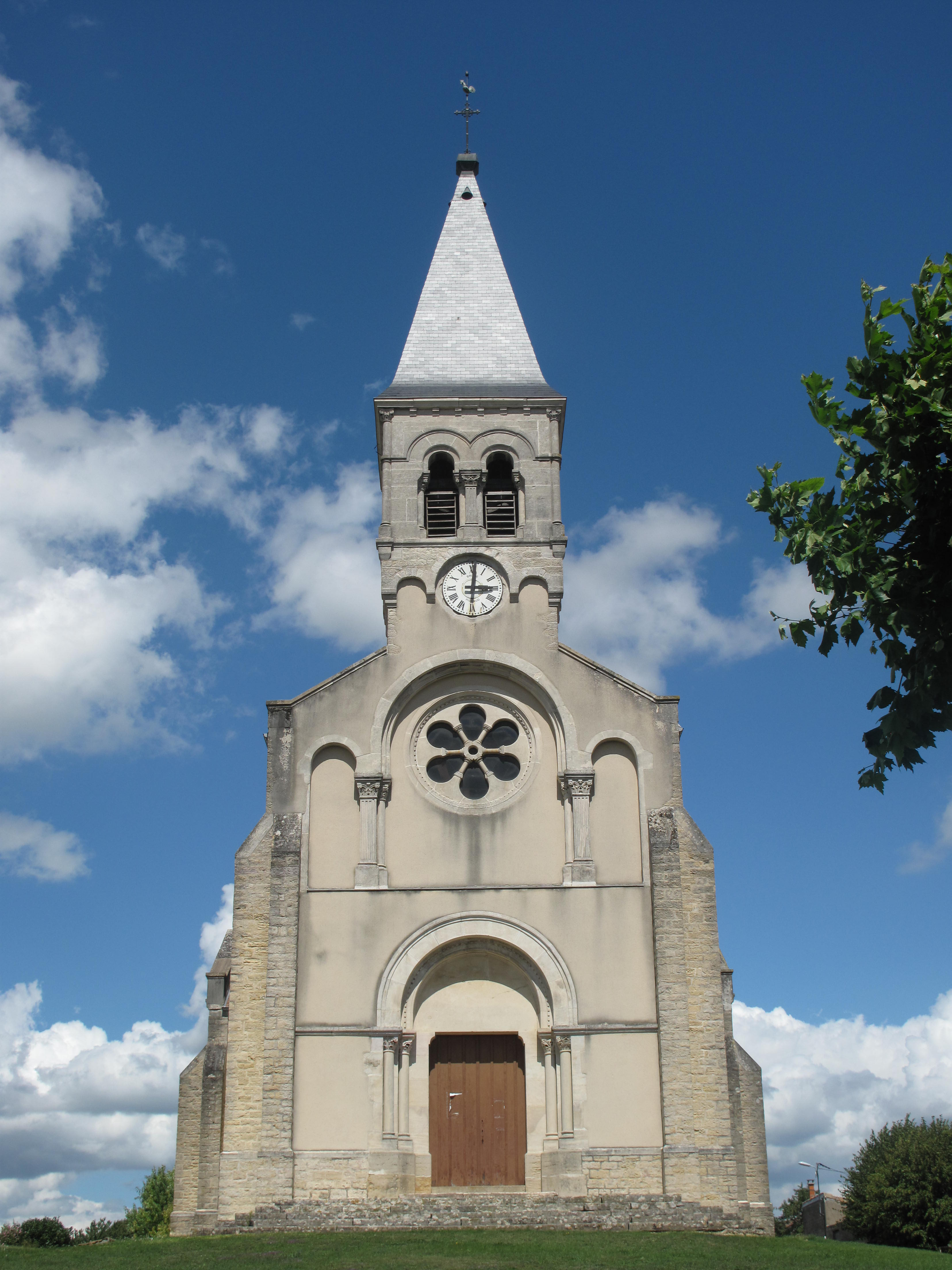
- The church in Lacrost
- Location of Lacrost
- Location within France Location within Bourgogne-Franche-Comté
- Coordinates: 46°33′24″N 4°55′47″E
- Country: France
- Region: Bourgogne-Franche-Comté
- Department: Saône-et-Loire
- Arrondissement: Mâcon
- Canton: Tournus
- Area^{1}: 10.53 km^{2} (4.07 sq mi)
- Elevation: 185 m (607 ft)
- Highest elevation: 212 m (696 ft)
- Lowest elevation: 168 m (551 ft)
- Population (2023): 690
  - Density: 66/km^{2} (170/sq mi)
- Time zone: UTC+01:00 (CET)
  - Summer (DST): UTC+02:00 (CEST)
- INSEE/Postal code: 71248 /71700
- ^{1} French Land Register data, which excludes lakes, ponds, glaciers > 1 km^{2} (0.386 sq mi or 247 acres) and river estuaries.

Lacrost (French pronunciation: [lakʁo]) is a commune in the Saône-et-Loire department in the region of Bourgogne-Franche-Comté in eastern France.

== See also ==
- Communes of the Saône-et-Loire department
