= Communes of the Saône-et-Loire department =

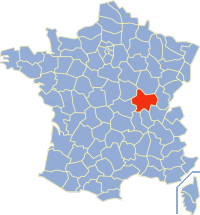

The following is a list of the 563 communes of the Saône-et-Loire department of France.

The communes cooperate in the following intercommunalities (as of 2025):

- Communauté urbaine Creusot Montceau
- Communauté d'agglomération Beaune Côte et Sud (partly)
- Communauté d'agglomération Le Grand Chalon
- Communauté d'agglomération Mâconnais Beaujolais Agglomération (partly)
- Communauté de communes Bresse Louhannaise Intercom'
- Communauté de communes Bresse Nord Intercom'
- Communauté de communes Bresse Revermont 71
- Communauté de communes Brionnais Sud Bourgogne
- Communauté de communes du Clunisois
- Communauté de communes Entre Arroux, Loire et Somme
- Communauté de communes Entre Saône et Grosne
- Communauté de communes du Grand Autunois Morvan
- Communauté de communes Le Grand Charolais (partly)
- Communauté de communes Mâconnais-Tournugeois
- Communauté de communes de Marcigny
- Communauté de communes Saint-Cyr Mère Boitier entre Charolais et Mâconnais
- Communauté de communes Saône Doubs Bresse
- Communauté de communes de Semur-en-Brionnais
- Communauté de communes Sud Côte Chalonnaise
- Communauté de communes Terres de Bresse

INSEE code	Postal code	Commune
71001	71290	L'Abergement-de-Cuisery
71002	71370	L'Abergement-Sainte-Colombe
71003	71350	Allerey-sur-Saône
71004	71380	Allériot
71005	71510	Aluze
71006	71800	Amanzé
71007	71460	Ameugny
71008	71170	Anglure-sous-Dun
71009	71550	Anost
71010	71400	Antully
71011	71110	Anzy-le-Duc
71012	71110	Artaix
71013	71270	Authumes
71014	71400	Autun
71015	71400	Auxy
71016	71260	Azé
71017	71220	Ballore
71018	71500	Bantanges
71019	71640	Barizey
71020	71540	Barnay
71021	71120	Baron
71022	71800	Baudemont
71023	71370	Baudrières
71024	71110	Baugy
71025	71220	Beaubery
71026	71240	Beaumont-sur-Grosne
71027	71580	Beaurepaire-en-Bresse
71028	71270	Beauvernois
71029	71270	Bellevesvre
71030	71250	Bergesserin
71032	71960	Berzé-la-Ville
71031	71960	Berzé-le-Châtel
71033	71620	Bey
71034	71390	Bissey-sous-Cruchaud
71035	71260	Bissy-la-Mâconnaise
71036	71460	Bissy-sous-Uxelles
71037	71460	Bissy-sur-Fley
71038	71710	Les Bizots
71039	71250	Blanot
71040	71450	Blanzy
71041	71800	Bois-Sainte-Marie
71042	71460	Bonnay-Saint-Ythaire
71043	71350	Les Bordes
71044	71330	Bosjean
71045	71330	Bouhans
71046	71320	La Boulaye
71047	71140	Bourbon-Lancy
71048	71110	Bourg-le-Comte
71050	71520	Bourgvilain
71051	71150	Bouzeron
71052	71700	Boyer
71054	71350	Bragny-sur-Saône
71056	71500	Branges
71057	71250	Bray
71058	71460	Bresse-sur-Grosne
71059	71670	Le Breuil
71060	71110	Briant
71061	71290	Brienne
71062	71190	Brion
71063	71190	Broye
71064	71500	Bruailles
71065	71250	Buffières
71066	71260	Burgy
71067	71460	Burnand
71068	71460	Burzy
71069	71960	Bussières
71070	71390	Buxy
71509	71400	La Celle-en-Morvan
71071	71110	Céron
71072	71390	Cersot
71073	71150	Chagny
71074	71570	Chaintré
71075	71140	Chalmoux
71076	71100	Chalon-sur-Saône
71077	71110	Chambilly
71078	71510	Chamilly
71079	71480	Champagnat
71080	71460	Champagny-sous-Uxelles
71081	71530	Champforgeuil
71082	71120	Champlecy
71084	71570	Chânes
71085	21340	Change
71086	71120	Changy
71087	71460	Chapaize
71088	71130	La Chapelle-au-Mans
71089	71240	La Chapelle-de-Bragny
71090	71570	La Chapelle-de-Guinchay
71091	71520	La Chapelle-du-Mont-de-France
71092	71500	La Chapelle-Naude
71093	71310	La Chapelle-Saint-Sauveur
71094	71700	La Chapelle-sous-Brancion
71095	71800	La Chapelle-sous-Dun
71096	71190	La Chapelle-sous-Uchon
71097	71470	La Chapelle-Thècle
71098	71320	Charbonnat
71099	71260	Charbonnières
71100	71700	Chardonnay
71101	71270	Charette-Varennes
71102	71100	La Charmée
71103	71710	Charmoy
71104	71350	Charnay-lès-Chalon
71105	71850	Charnay-lès-Mâcon
71106	71120	Charolles
71107	71510	Charrecey
71108	71570	Chasselas
71109	71150	Chassey-le-Camp
71110	71170	Chassigny-sous-Dun
71111	71130	Chassy
71112	71250	Château
71113	71740	Châteauneuf
71115	71510	Châtel-Moron
71116	71800	Châtenay
71117	71380	Châtenoy-en-Bresse
71118	71880	Châtenoy-le-Royal
71119	71150	Chaudenay
71120	71170	Chauffailles
71121	71310	La Chaux
71122	71150	Cheilly-lès-Maranges
71123	71340	Chenay-le-Châtel
71124	71390	Chenôves
71125	71250	Chérizet
71126	71960	Chevagny-les-Chevrières
71127	71220	Chevagny-sur-Guye
71128	71220	Chiddes
71129	71540	Chissey-en-Morvan
71130	71460	Chissey-lès-Mâcon
71132	71420	Ciry-le-Noble
71133	71800	La Clayette
71135	71260	Clessé
71136	71130	Clessy
71137	71250	Cluny
71578	71270	Clux-Villeneuve
71139	71460	Collonge-en-Charollais
71140	71360	Collonge-la-Madeleine
71141	71800	Colombier-en-Brionnais
71142	71990	La Comelle
71143	71480	Condal
71144	71540	Cordesse
71145	71460	Cormatin
71146	71250	Cortambert
71147	71460	Cortevaix
71148	71170	Coublanc
71149	71490	Couches
71150	71680	Crêches-sur-Saône
71151	71490	Créot
71152	71760	Cressy-sur-Somme
71153	71200	Le Creusot
71154	71530	Crissey
71155	71140	Cronat
71156	71260	Cruzille
71157	71480	Cuiseaux
71158	71290	Cuisery
71159	71460	Culles-les-Roches
71160	71800	Curbigny
71161	71130	Curdin
71162	71400	Curgy
71163	71520	Curtil-sous-Buffières
71164	71460	Curtil-sous-Burnand
71165	71550	Cussy-en-Morvan
71166	71320	Cuzy
71167	71620	Damerey
71168	71310	Dampierre-en-Bresse
71169	71960	Davayé
71170	71150	Demigny
71171	71510	Dennevy
71172	71190	Dettey
71173	71330	Devrouze
71174	71150	Dezize-lès-Maranges
71175	71330	Diconne
71176	71160	Digoin
71177	71480	Dommartin-lès-Cuiseaux
71178	71520	Dompierre-les-Ormes
71179	71420	Dompierre-sous-Sanvignes
71181	71250	Donzy-le-Pertuis
71182	71640	Dracy-le-Fort
71183	71490	Dracy-lès-Couches
71184	71400	Dracy-Saint-Loup
71185	71800	Dyo
71186	71350	Écuelles
71187	71210	Écuisses
71188	71360	Épertully
71189	71380	Épervans
71190	71360	Épinac
71191	71510	Essertenne
71192	71190	Étang-sur-Arroux
71193	71240	Étrigny
71194	71150	Farges-lès-Chalon
71195	71700	Farges-lès-Mâcon
71196	71580	Le Fay
71198	71580	Flacey-en-Bresse
71199	71250	Flagy
71591	71260	Fleurville
71200	71340	Fleury-la-Montagne
71201	71390	Fley
71202	71150	Fontaines
71203	71120	Fontenay
71204	71530	Fragnes-la-Loyère
71205	71330	Frangy-en-Bresse
71206	71440	La Frette
71207	71270	Fretterans
71208	71270	Frontenard
71209	71580	Frontenaud
71210	71960	Fuissé
71212	71420	Génelard
71213	71290	La Genête
71214	71460	Genouilly
71215	71590	Gergy
71216	71460	Germagny
71217	71520	Germolles-sur-Grosne
71218	71800	Gibles
71219	71240	Gigny-sur-Saône
71220	71160	Gilly-sur-Loire
71221	71640	Givry
71222	71300	Gourdon
71223	71990	La Grande-Verrière
71224	71430	Grandvaux
71225	71390	Granges
71226	71700	Grevilly
71227	71760	Grury
71228	71620	Guerfand
71229	71160	Les Guerreaux
71230	71130	Gueugnon
71231	71220	La Guiche
71232	71600	Hautefond
71233	71600	L'Hôpital-le-Mercier
71234	71290	Huilly-sur-Seille
71235	71870	Hurigny
71236	71960	Igé
71237	71540	Igornay
71238	71340	Iguerande
71239	71760	Issy-l'Évêque
71240	71250	Jalogny
71241	71640	Jambles
71242	71460	Joncy
71243	71480	Joudes
71244	71290	Jouvençon
71245	71240	Jugy
71246	71440	Juif
71247	71390	Jully-lès-Buxy
71248	71700	Lacrost
71249	71240	Laives
71250	71870	Laizé
71251	71190	Laizy
71252	71240	Lalheue
71253	71380	Lans
71254	71270	Lays-sur-le-Doubs
71255	71140	Lesme
71256	71440	Lessard-en-Bresse
71257	71530	Lessard-le-National
71258	71570	Leynes
71259	71110	Ligny-en-Brionnais
71261	71290	Loisy
71262	71270	Longepierre
71263	71500	Louhans-Châteaurenaud
71264	71250	Lournand
71266	71540	Lucenay-l'Évêque
71267	71260	Lugny
71268	71120	Lugny-lès-Charolles
71269	71100	Lux
71270	71000	Mâcon
71271	71340	Mailly
71272	71460	Malay
71273	71140	Maltat
71274	71240	Mancey
71275	71110	Marcigny
71276	71120	Marcilly-la-Gueurce
71277	71390	Marcilly-lès-Buxy
71278	71300	Marigny
71280	71760	Marly-sous-Issy
71281	71420	Marly-sur-Arroux
71282	71710	Marmagne
71283	71240	Marnay
71284	71700	Martailly-lès-Brancion
71285	71220	Martigny-le-Comte
71286	71300	Mary
71287	71250	Massilly
71289	71520	Matour
71290	71250	Mazille
71291	71340	Melay
71292	71640	Mellecey

INSEE code	Postal code	Commune
71293	71470	Ménetreuil
71294	71640	Mercurey
71295	71310	Mervans
71296	71390	Messey-sur-Grosne
71297	71190	Mesvres
71299	71960	Milly-Lamartine
71300	71480	Le Miroir
71301	71140	Mont
71302	71390	Montagny-lès-Buxy
71303	71500	Montagny-près-Louhans
71305	71260	Montbellet
71306	71300	Montceau-les-Mines
71307	71110	Montceaux-l'Étoile
71308	71240	Montceaux-Ragny
71309	71710	Montcenis
71310	71210	Montchanin
71311	71500	Montcony
71312	71620	Montcoy
71313	71400	Monthelon
71314	71310	Montjay
71315	71270	Mont-lès-Seurre
71316	71520	Montmelard
71317	71320	Montmort
71318	71470	Montpont-en-Bresse
71319	71440	Montret
71320	71300	Mont-Saint-Vincent
71321	71510	Morey
71322	71360	Morlet
71323	71220	Mornay
71324	71390	Moroges
71325	71160	La Motte-Saint-Jean
71326	71270	Mouthier-en-Bresse
71327	71170	Mussy-sous-Dun
71328	71240	Nanton
71329	71270	Navilly
71134	71520	Navour-sur-Grosne
71330	71130	Neuvy-Grandchamp
71331	71600	Nochize
71332	71290	Ormes
71333	71380	Oslon
71334	71420	Oudry
71335	71800	Ouroux-sous-le-Bois-Sainte-Marie
71336	71370	Ouroux-sur-Saône
71337	71800	Oyé
71338	71700	Ozenay
71339	71120	Ozolles
71340	71430	Palinges
71341	71350	Palleau
71342	71600	Paray-le-Monial
71343	71150	Paris-l'Hôpital
71344	71220	Passy
71345	71260	Péronne
71346	71420	Perrecy-les-Forges
71347	71510	Perreuil
71348	71160	Perrigny-sur-Loire
71349	71400	La Petite-Verrière
71350	71960	Pierreclos
71351	71270	Pierre-de-Bresse
71352	71330	Le Planois
71353	71700	Plottes
71354	71600	Poisson
71355	71270	Pontoux
71356	71230	Pouilloux
71357	71270	Pourlans
71358	71220	Pressy-sous-Dondin
71359	71290	Préty
71360	71960	Prissé
71361	71800	Prizy
71362	71570	Pruzilly
71363	71460	Le Puley
71364	71310	La Racineuse
71365	71290	Rancy
71366	71290	Ratenelle
71367	71500	Ratte
71368	71540	Reclesne
71369	71150	Remigny
71370	71160	Rigny-sur-Arroux
71371	71960	La Roche-Vineuse
71372	71570	Romanèche-Thorins
71373	71470	Romenay
71374	71390	Rosey
71279	71220	Le Rousset-Marizy
71376	71550	Roussillon-en-Morvan
71377	71700	Royer
71378	71150	Rully
71379	71580	Sagy
71380	71580	Saillenard
71381	71250	Sailly
71382	71160	Saint-Agnan
71383	71260	Saint-Albain
71384	71240	Saint-Ambreuil
71385	71570	Saint-Amour-Bellevue
71386	71440	Saint-André-en-Bresse
71387	71220	Saint-André-le-Désert
71388	71430	Saint-Aubin-en-Charollais
71389	71140	Saint-Aubin-sur-Loire
71390	71300	Saint-Berain-sous-Sanvignes
71391	71510	Saint-Bérain-sur-Dheune
71392	71390	Saint-Boil
71393	71340	Saint-Bonnet-de-Cray
71394	71220	Saint-Bonnet-de-Joux
71395	71430	Saint-Bonnet-de-Vieille-Vigne
71396	71310	Saint-Bonnet-en-Bresse
71398	71370	Saint-Christophe-en-Bresse
71399	71800	Saint-Christophe-en-Brionnais
71400	71460	Saint-Clément-sur-Guye
71402	71240	Saint-Cyr
71403	71640	Saint-Denis-de-Vaux
71404	71390	Saint-Désert
71405	71620	Saint-Didier-en-Bresse
71406	71110	Saint-Didier-en-Brionnais
71407	71190	Saint-Didier-sur-Arroux
71397	71250	Sainte-Cécile
71401	71470	Sainte-Croix-en-Bresse
71408	71740	Saint-Edmond
71415	71110	Sainte-Foy
71426	71390	Sainte-Hélène
71409	71490	Saint-Émiland
71474	71320	Sainte-Radegonde
71410	71370	Saint-Étienne-en-Bresse
71411	71190	Saint-Eugène
71412	71210	Saint-Eusèbe
71413	71670	Saint-Firmin
71414	71400	Saint-Forgeot
71416	71260	Saint-Gengoux-de-Scissé
71417	71460	Saint-Gengoux-le-National
71419	71330	Saint-Germain-du-Bois
71420	71370	Saint-Germain-du-Plain
71421	71800	Saint-Germain-en-Brionnais
71422	71390	Saint-Germain-lès-Buxy
71423	71350	Saint-Gervais-en-Vallière
71424	71490	Saint-Gervais-sur-Couches
71425	71510	Saint-Gilles
71427	71460	Saint-Huruge
71428	71170	Saint-Igny-de-Roche
71431	71490	Saint-Jean-de-Trézy
71430	71640	Saint-Jean-de-Vaux
71433	71800	Saint-Julien-de-Civry
71434	71110	Saint-Julien-de-Jonzy
71435	71210	Saint-Julien-sur-Dheune
71436	71210	Saint-Laurent-d'Andenay
71437	71800	Saint-Laurent-en-Brionnais
71438	71360	Saint-Léger-du-Bois
71439	71600	Saint-Léger-lès-Paray
71440	71990	Saint-Léger-sous-Beuvray
71441	71520	Saint-Léger-sous-la-Bussière
71442	71510	Saint-Léger-sur-Dheune
71444	71240	Saint-Loup-de-Varennes
71443	71350	Saint-Loup-Géanges
71445	71380	Saint-Marcel
71446	71460	Saint-Marcelin-de-Cray
71447	71640	Saint-Mard-de-Vaux
71448	71118	Saint-Martin-Belle-Roche
71449	71390	Saint-Martin-d'Auxy
71450	71490	Saint-Martin-de-Commune
71451	71740	Saint-Martin-de-Lixy
71452	71220	Saint-Martin-de-Salencey
71453	71110	Saint-Martin-du-Lac
71454	71580	Saint-Martin-du-Mont
71455	71460	Saint-Martin-du-Tartre
71456	71620	Saint-Martin-en-Bresse
71457	71350	Saint-Martin-en-Gâtinois
71458	71460	Saint-Martin-la-Patrouille
71459	71640	Saint-Martin-sous-Montaigu
71460	71260	Saint-Maurice-de-Satonnay
71461	71460	Saint-Maurice-des-Champs
71462	71620	Saint-Maurice-en-Rivière
71463	71740	Saint-Maurice-lès-Châteauneuf
71464	71490	Saint-Maurice-lès-Couches
71465	71460	Saint-Micaud
71466	71190	Saint-Nizier-sur-Arroux
71468	71670	Saint-Pierre-de-Varennes
71469	71520	Saint-Pierre-le-Vieux
71470	71520	Saint-Point
71471	71390	Saint-Privé
71472	71990	Saint-Prix
71473	71800	Saint-Racho
71475	71100	Saint-Rémy
71477	71230	Saint-Romain-sous-Gourdon
71478	71420	Saint-Romain-sous-Versigny
71479	71200	Saint-Sernin-du-Bois
71480	71510	Saint-Sernin-du-Plain
71481	71570	Saint-Symphorien-d'Ancelles
71482	71710	Saint-Symphorien-de-Marmagne
71483	71800	Saint-Symphorien-des-Bois
71484	71500	Saint-Usuge
71485	71390	Saint-Vallerin
71486	71230	Saint-Vallier
71487	71570	Saint-Vérand
71490	71430	Saint-Vincent-Bragny
71488	71250	Saint-Vincent-des-Prés
71489	71440	Saint-Vincent-en-Bresse
71491	71600	Saint-Yan
71493	71360	Saisy
71494	71260	La Salle
71495	71250	Salornay-sur-Guye
71496	71150	Sampigny-lès-Maranges
71497	71000	Sancé
71498	71460	Santilly
71499	71410	Sanvignes-les-Mines
71500	71110	Sarry
71501	71390	Sassangy
71502	71530	Sassenay
71503	71390	Saules
71504	71350	Saunières
71505	71460	Savianges
71506	71580	Savigny-en-Revermont
71507	71460	Savigny-sur-Grosne
71508	71440	Savigny-sur-Seille
71510	71110	Semur-en-Brionnais
71512	71240	Sennecey-le-Grand
71513	71260	Senozan
71514	71330	Sens-sur-Seille
71515	71460	Sercy
71516	71310	Serley
71517	71350	Sermesse
71518	71960	Serrières
71519	71310	Serrigny-en-Bresse
71520	71100	Sevrey
71521	71250	Sigy-le-Châtel
71522	71290	Simandre
71523	71330	Simard
71524	71220	Sivignon
71525	71960	Sologny
71526	71960	Solutré-Pouilly
71527	71540	Sommant
71528	71500	Sornay
71529	71220	Suin
71530	71360	Sully
71531	71190	La Tagnière
71532	71250	Taizé
71533	71740	Tancon
71534	71330	Le Tartre
71535	71400	Tavernay
71537	71190	Thil-sur-Arroux
71538	71440	Thurey
71539	71490	Tintry
71540	71210	Torcy
71541	71270	Torpes
71542	71320	Toulon-sur-Arroux
71543	71700	Tournus
71544	71350	Toutenant
71545	71520	Tramayes
71546	71520	Trambly
71547	71520	Trivy
71548	71440	Tronchy
71549	71290	La Truchère
71550	71700	Uchizy
71551	71190	Uchon
71552	71130	Uxeau
71553	71800	Vareilles
71554	71110	Varenne-l'Arconce
71557	71600	Varenne-Saint-Germain
71555	71240	Varennes-le-Grand
71556	71000	Varennes-lès-Mâcon
71558	71480	Varennes-Saint-Sauveur
71559	71800	Varennes-sous-Dun
71561	71800	Vauban
71562	71120	Vaudebarrier
71563	71460	Vaux-en-Pré
71564	71120	Vendenesse-lès-Charolles
71565	71130	Vendenesse-sur-Arroux
71566	71350	Verdun-Ciel
71567	71960	Vergisson
71568	71440	Vérissey
71570	71590	Verjux
71571	71220	Verosvres
71572	71240	Vers
71573	71110	Versaugues
71574	71960	Verzé
71576	71700	Le Villars
71577	71620	Villegaudin
71579	71390	Villeneuve-en-Montagne
71580	71500	Vincelles
71581	71110	Vindecy
71582	71250	La Vineuse sur Fregande
71583	71680	Vinzelles
71584	71260	Viré
71585	71530	Virey-le-Grand
71586	71120	Viry
71588	71600	Vitry-en-Charollais
71589	71140	Vitry-sur-Loire
71590	71600	Volesvres
