= Jugy =

- Commune
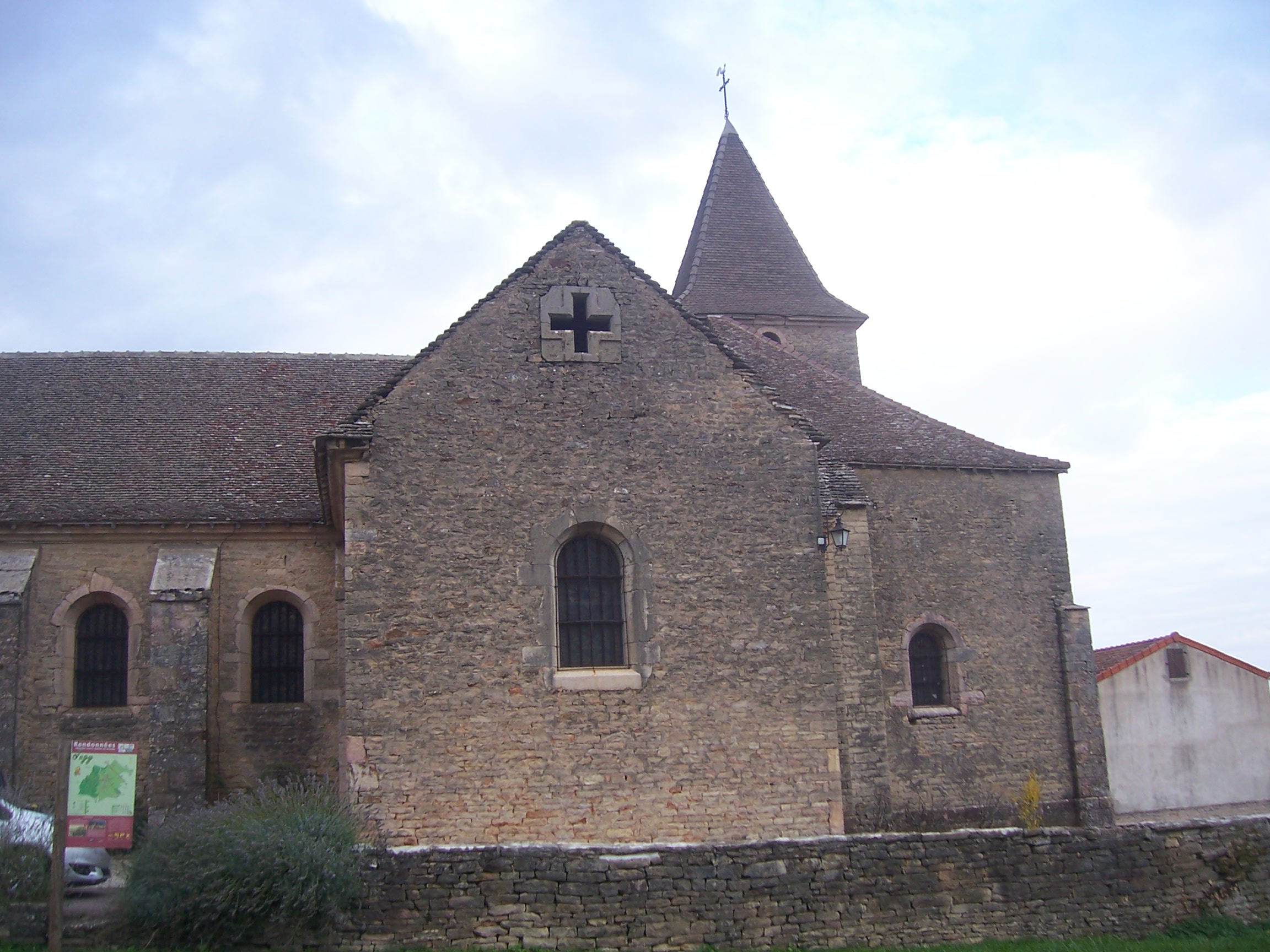
- The church in Jugy
- Location of Jugy
- Location within France Location within Bourgogne-Franche-Comté
- Coordinates: 46°36′28″N 4°51′57″E
- Country: France
- Region: Bourgogne-Franche-Comté
- Department: Saône-et-Loire
- Arrondissement: Chalon-sur-Saône
- Canton: Tournus
- Area^{1}: 7.69 km^{2} (2.97 sq mi)
- Elevation: 300 m (980 ft)
- Highest elevation: 468 m (1,535 ft)
- Lowest elevation: 190 m (620 ft)
- Population (2023): 332
  - Density: 43.2/km^{2} (112/sq mi)
- Time zone: UTC+01:00 (CET)
  - Summer (DST): UTC+02:00 (CEST)
- INSEE/Postal code: 71245 /71240
- ^{1} French Land Register data, which excludes lakes, ponds, glaciers > 1 km^{2} (0.386 sq mi or 247 acres) and river estuaries.

Jugy (French pronunciation: [ʒyʒi]) is a commune in the Saône-et-Loire department in the region of Bourgogne-Franche-Comté in eastern France.

== See also ==
- Communes of the Saône-et-Loire department
