= Plottes =

- Commune
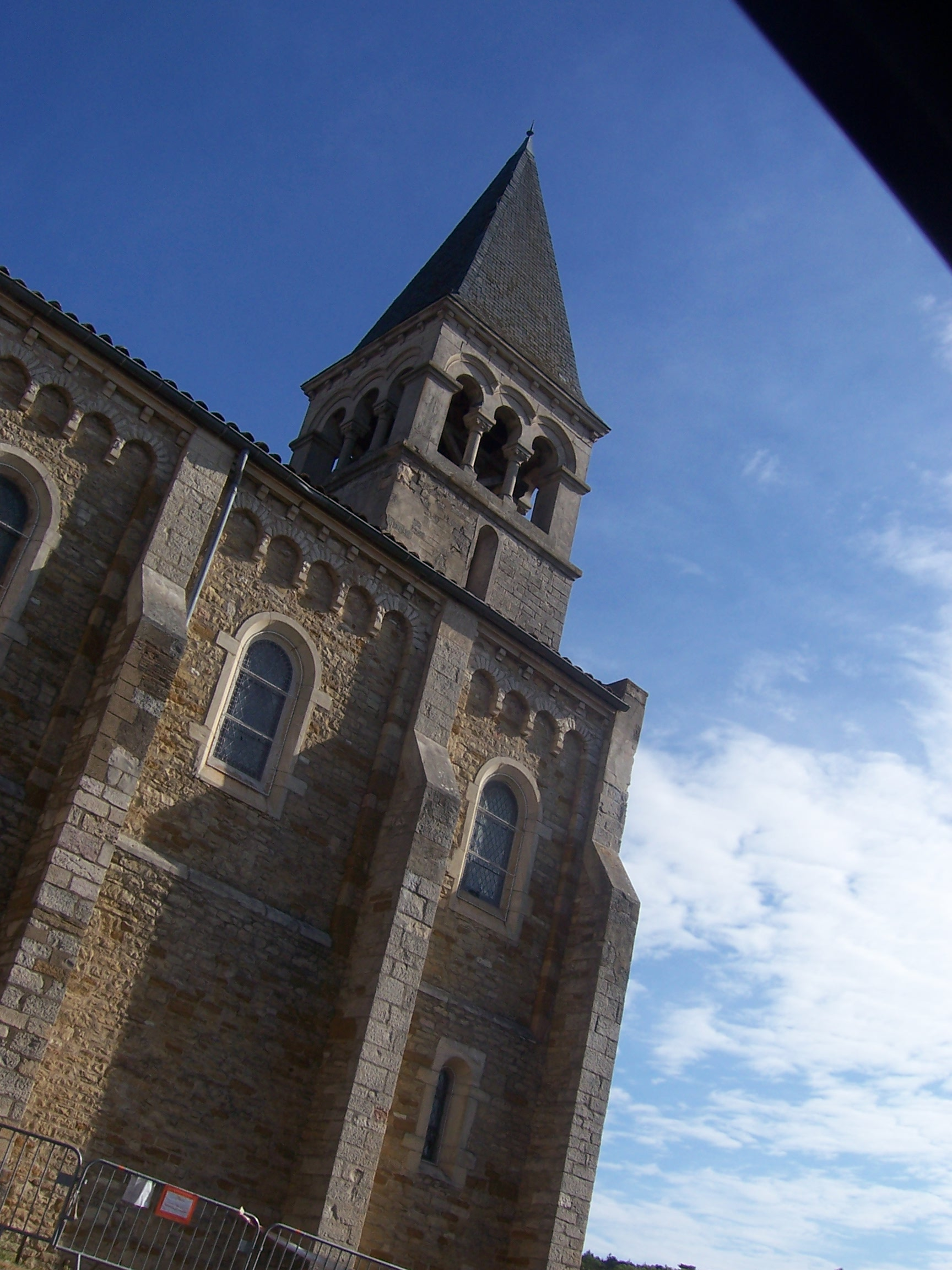
- The church in Plottes

- Coat of arms
- Location of Plottes
- Location within France Location within Bourgogne-Franche-Comté
- Coordinates: 46°31′46″N 4°52′21″E
- Country: France
- Region: Bourgogne-Franche-Comté
- Department: Saône-et-Loire
- Arrondissement: Mâcon
- Canton: Tournus

Government
  - Mayor (2020–2026): Philippe Eloy
- Area^{1}: 10.07 km^{2} (3.89 sq mi)
- Highest elevation: 353 m (1,158 ft)
- Lowest elevation: 186 m (610 ft)
- Population (2023): 558
  - Density: 55.4/km^{2} (144/sq mi)
- Time zone: UTC+01:00 (CET)
  - Summer (DST): UTC+02:00 (CEST)
- INSEE/Postal code: 71353 /71700
- ^{1} French Land Register data, which excludes lakes, ponds, glaciers > 1 km^{2} (0.386 sq mi or 247 acres) and river estuaries.

Plottes (French pronunciation: [plɔt]) is a commune in the Saône-et-Loire department in the region of Bourgogne-Franche-Comté in eastern France.

Plottes was part of Tournus between January 1, 1973 and March 11, 2001.

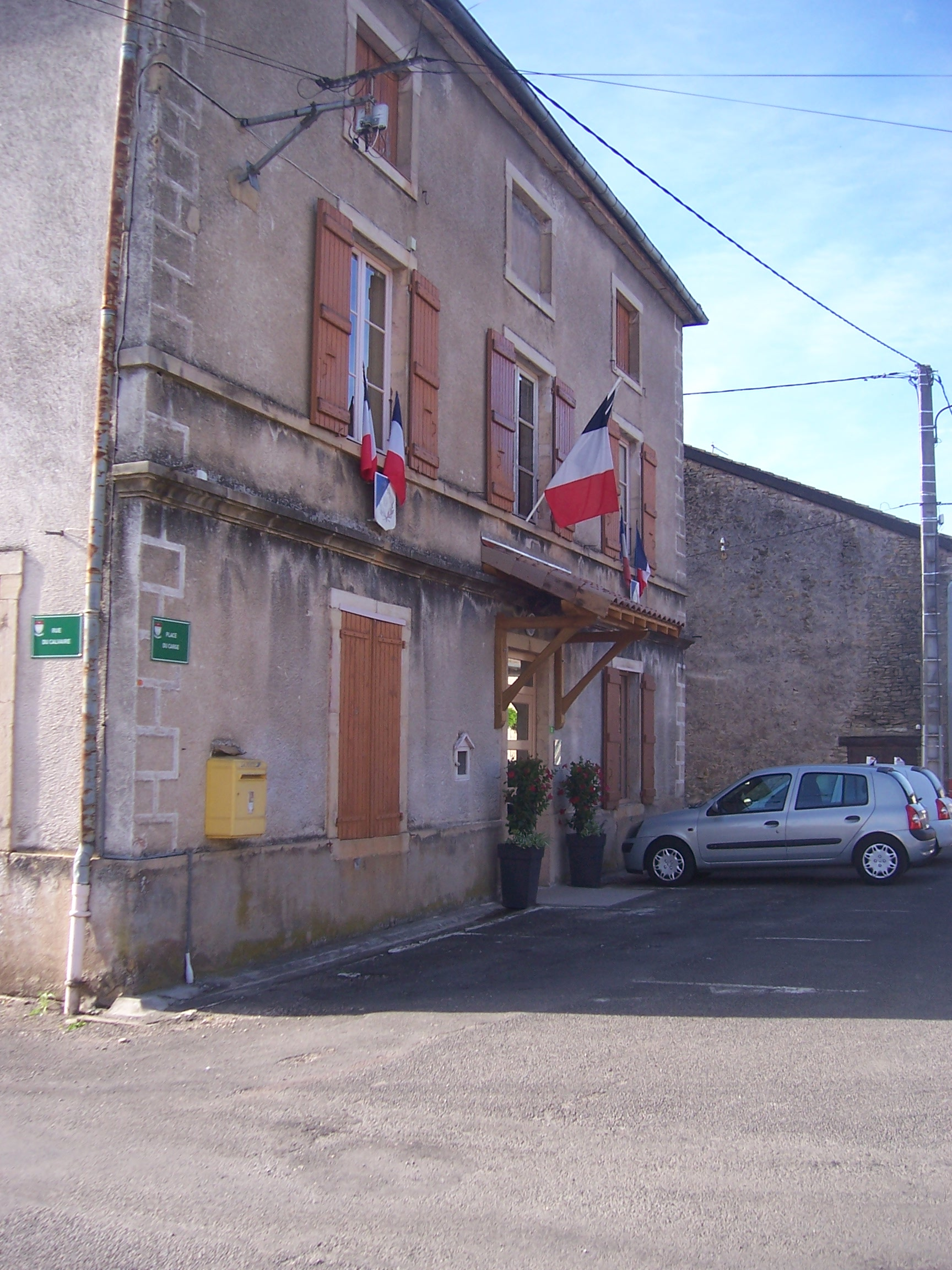
Town hall

== See also ==
- Communes of the Saône-et-Loire department
