= Farges-lès-Mâcon =

Farges-lès-Macon
- Commune
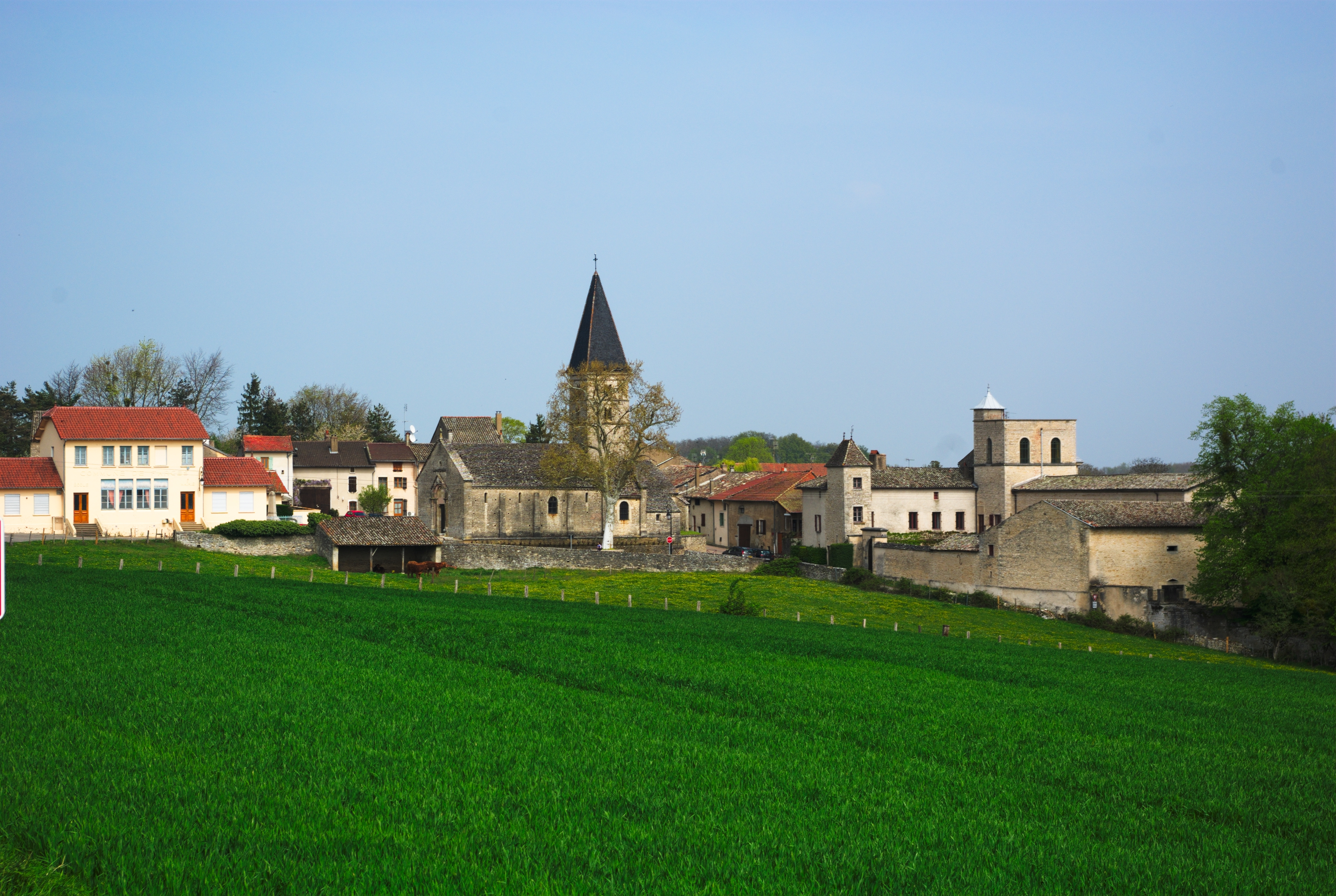
- A general view of Farges-lès-Mâcon
- Location of Farges-lès-Macon
- Location within France Location within Bourgogne-Franche-Comté
- Coordinates: 46°30′46″N 4°54′01″E
- Country: France
- Region: Bourgogne-Franche-Comté
- Department: Saône-et-Loire
- Arrondissement: Mâcon
- Canton: Tournus
- Area^{1}: 5.73 km^{2} (2.21 sq mi)
- Elevation: 330 m (1,080 ft)
- Highest elevation: 322 m (1,056 ft)
- Lowest elevation: 168 m (551 ft)
- Population (2023): 223
  - Density: 38.9/km^{2} (101/sq mi)
- Time zone: UTC+01:00 (CET)
  - Summer (DST): UTC+02:00 (CEST)
- INSEE/Postal code: 71195 /71700
- ^{1} French Land Register data, which excludes lakes, ponds, glaciers > 1 km^{2} (0.386 sq mi or 247 acres) and river estuaries.

Farges-lès-Mâcon (French pronunciation: [faʁʒ lɛ makɔ̃]) is a commune in the Saône-et-Loire department in the region of Bourgogne-Franche-Comté in eastern France.

== See also ==
- Communes of the Saône-et-Loire department
