= Royer, Saône-et-Loire =

Royer
- Commune
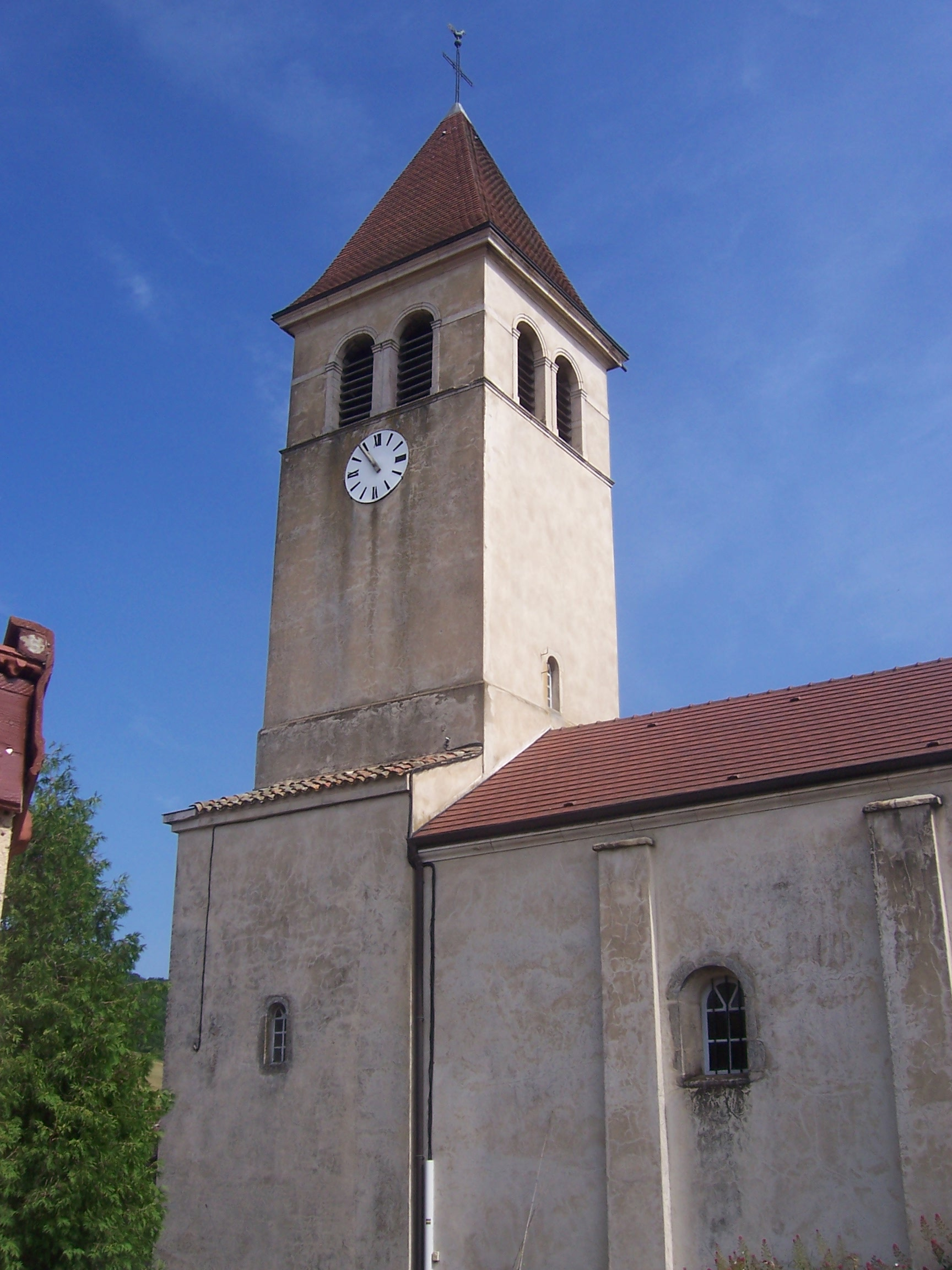
- The church in Royer
- Location of Royer
- Location within France Location within Bourgogne-Franche-Comté
- Coordinates: 46°33′24″N 4°49′31″E
- Country: France
- Region: Bourgogne-Franche-Comté
- Department: Saône-et-Loire
- Arrondissement: Mâcon
- Canton: Tournus
- Area^{1}: 5.89 km^{2} (2.27 sq mi)
- Elevation: 330 m (1,080 ft)
- Highest elevation: 422 m (1,385 ft)
- Lowest elevation: 235 m (771 ft)
- Population (2023): 138
  - Density: 23.4/km^{2} (60.7/sq mi)
- Time zone: UTC+01:00 (CET)
  - Summer (DST): UTC+02:00 (CEST)
- INSEE/Postal code: 71377 /71700
- ^{1} French Land Register data, which excludes lakes, ponds, glaciers > 1 km^{2} (0.386 sq mi or 247 acres) and river estuaries.

Royer is a commune in the Saône-et-Loire department in the region of Bourgogne-Franche-Comté in eastern France.

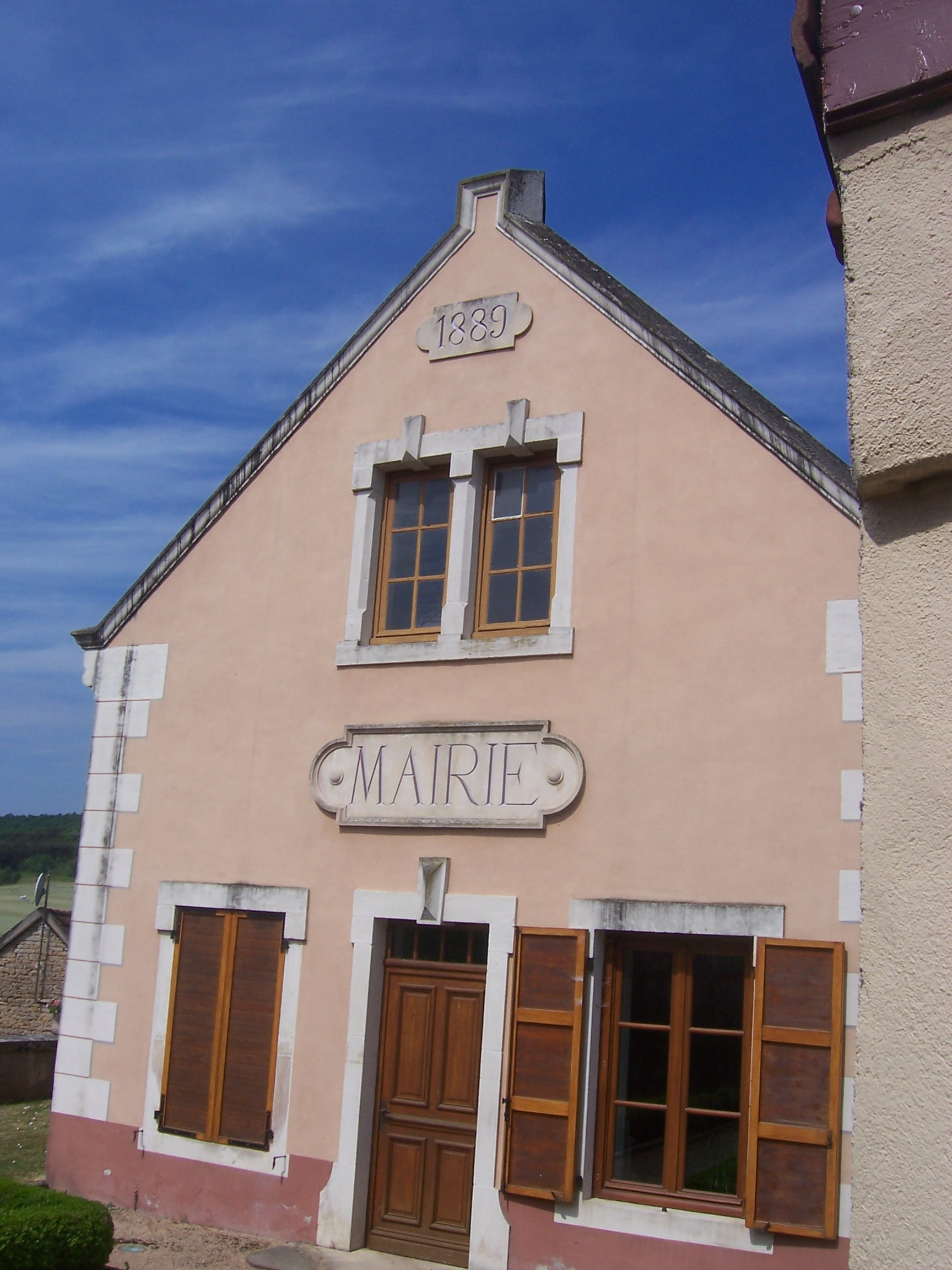
Town hall

== See also ==
- Communes of the Saône-et-Loire department
