= Lalheue =

- Commune
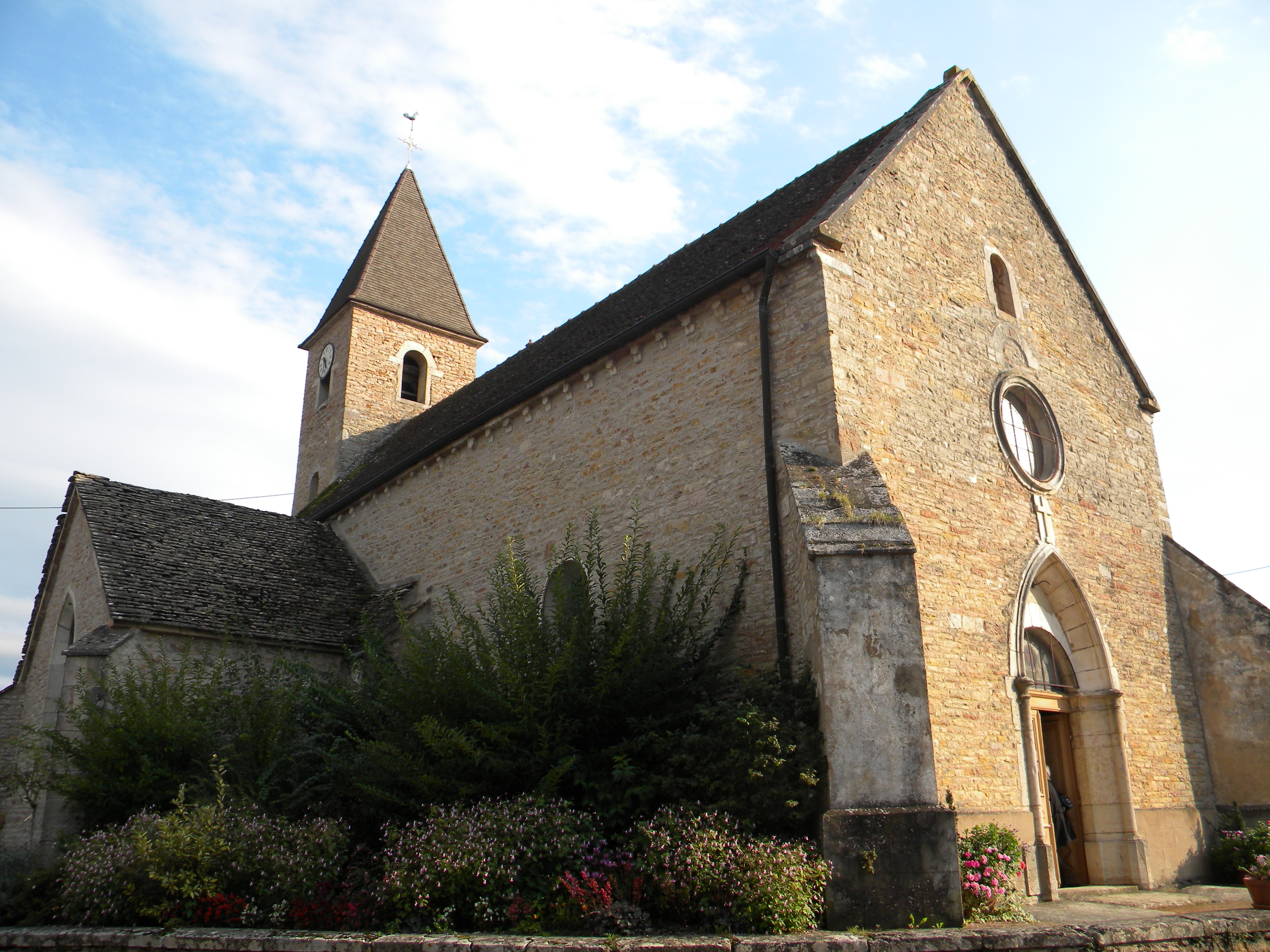
- The church in Lalheue
- Location of Lalheue
- Location within France Location within Bourgogne-Franche-Comté
- Coordinates: 46°38′57″N 4°47′43″E
- Country: France
- Region: Bourgogne-Franche-Comté
- Department: Saône-et-Loire
- Arrondissement: Chalon-sur-Saône
- Canton: Tournus
- Intercommunality: Entre Saône et Grosne

Government
  - Mayor (2020–2026): Christian Cretin
- Area^{1}: 6.87 km^{2} (2.65 sq mi)
- Elevation: 185 m (607 ft)
- Highest elevation: 209 m (686 ft)
- Lowest elevation: 181 m (594 ft)
- Population (2023): 363
  - Density: 52.8/km^{2} (137/sq mi)
- Time zone: UTC+01:00 (CET)
  - Summer (DST): UTC+02:00 (CEST)
- INSEE/Postal code: 71252 /71240
- ^{1} French Land Register data, which excludes lakes, ponds, glaciers > 1 km^{2} (0.386 sq mi or 247 acres) and river estuaries.

Lalheue (French pronunciation: [lalø]) is a commune in the Saône-et-Loire department in the region of Bourgogne-Franche-Comté in eastern France.

== Geography ==
The Grison, a tributary of the Grosne, forms most of the commune's eastern border. The Grosne flows northeast through the northwestern part of the commune.

== See also ==
- Communes of the Saône-et-Loire department
