= Grevilly =

- Commune
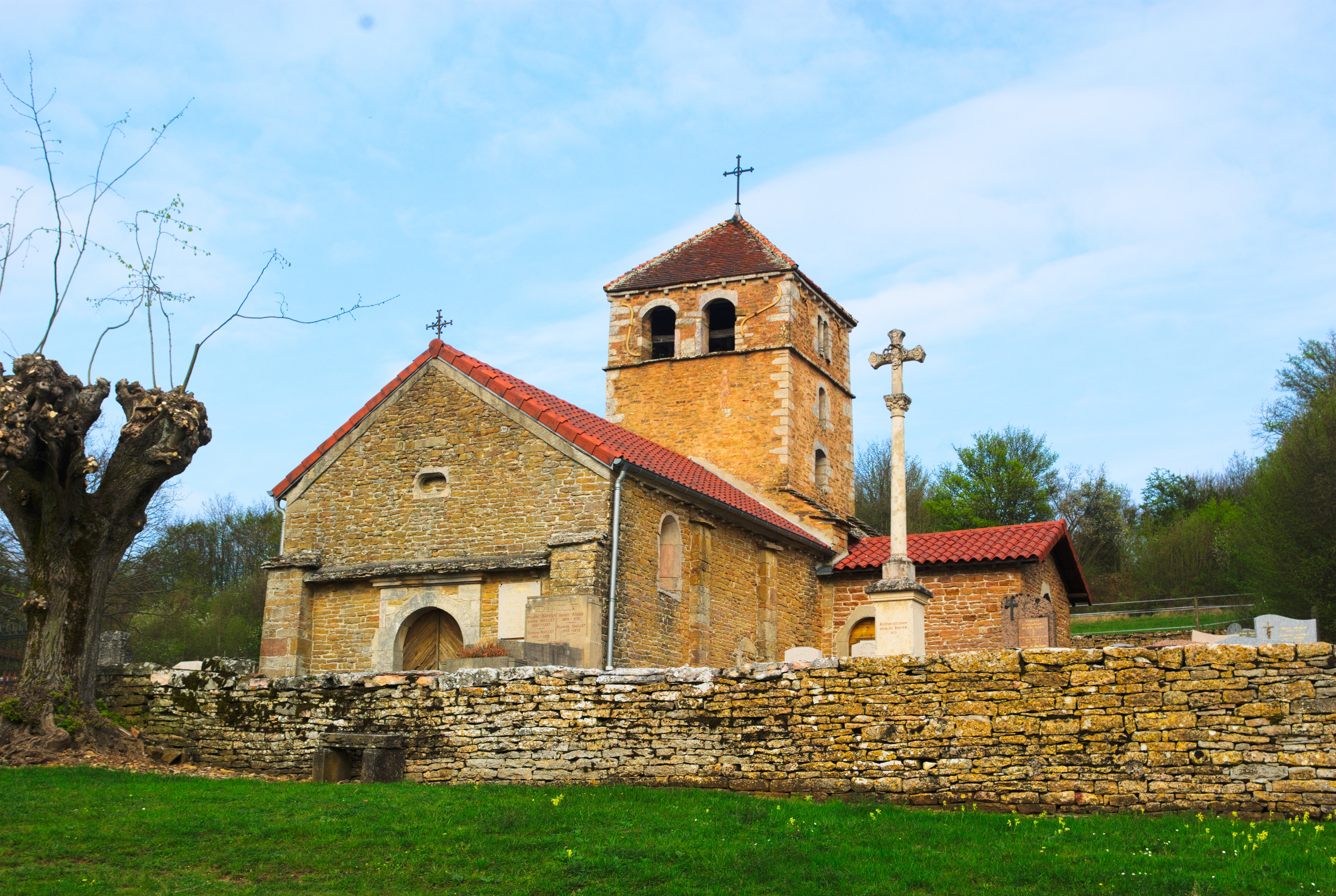
- The church in Grevilly
- Location of Grevilly
- Location within France Location within Bourgogne-Franche-Comté
- Coordinates: 46°30′55″N 4°49′05″E
- Country: France
- Region: Bourgogne-Franche-Comté
- Department: Saône-et-Loire
- Arrondissement: Mâcon
- Canton: Tournus

Government
  - Mayor (2020–2026): Patrice Raguet
- Area^{1}: 2.65 km^{2} (1.02 sq mi)
- Elevation: 400 m (1,300 ft)
- Highest elevation: 401 m (1,316 ft)
- Lowest elevation: 299 m (981 ft)
- Population (2023): 27
  - Density: 10/km^{2} (26/sq mi)
- Time zone: UTC+01:00 (CET)
  - Summer (DST): UTC+02:00 (CEST)
- INSEE/Postal code: 71226 /71700
- ^{1} French Land Register data, which excludes lakes, ponds, glaciers > 1 km^{2} (0.386 sq mi or 247 acres) and river estuaries.

Grevilly is a commune in the Saône-et-Loire department in the region of Bourgogne-Franche-Comté in eastern France.

== See also ==
- Communes of the Saône-et-Loire department
