= Canton of Tournus =

Canton in the Saône-et-Loire department, France

- Canton
- Interactive map of Canton of Tournus
- Coordinates: 46.56°N 4.91°E
- Country: France
- Region: Bourgogne-Franche-Comté
- Department: Saône-et-Loire
- Seat: Tournus

The canton of Tournus is an administrative division of the Saône-et-Loire department, eastern France. Its borders were modified at the French canton reorganisation which came into effect in March 2015. Its seat is in Tournus.

It consists of the following communes:

1. Beaumont-sur-Grosne
2. Boyer
3. Bresse-sur-Grosne
4. Champagny-sous-Uxelles
5. La Chapelle-de-Bragny
6. La Chapelle-sous-Brancion
7. Chardonnay
8. Étrigny
9. Farges-lès-Mâcon
10. Gigny-sur-Saône
11. Grevilly
12. Jugy
13. Lacrost
14. Laives
15. Lalheue
16. Mancey
17. Martailly-lès-Brancion
18. Montceaux-Ragny
19. Nanton
20. Ozenay
21. Plottes
22. Préty
23. Royer
24. Saint-Ambreuil
25. Saint-Cyr
26. Sennecey-le-Grand
27. Tournus
28. La Truchère
29. Uchizy
30. Vers
31. Le Villars
