= Vers, Saône-et-Loire =

Vers
- Commune
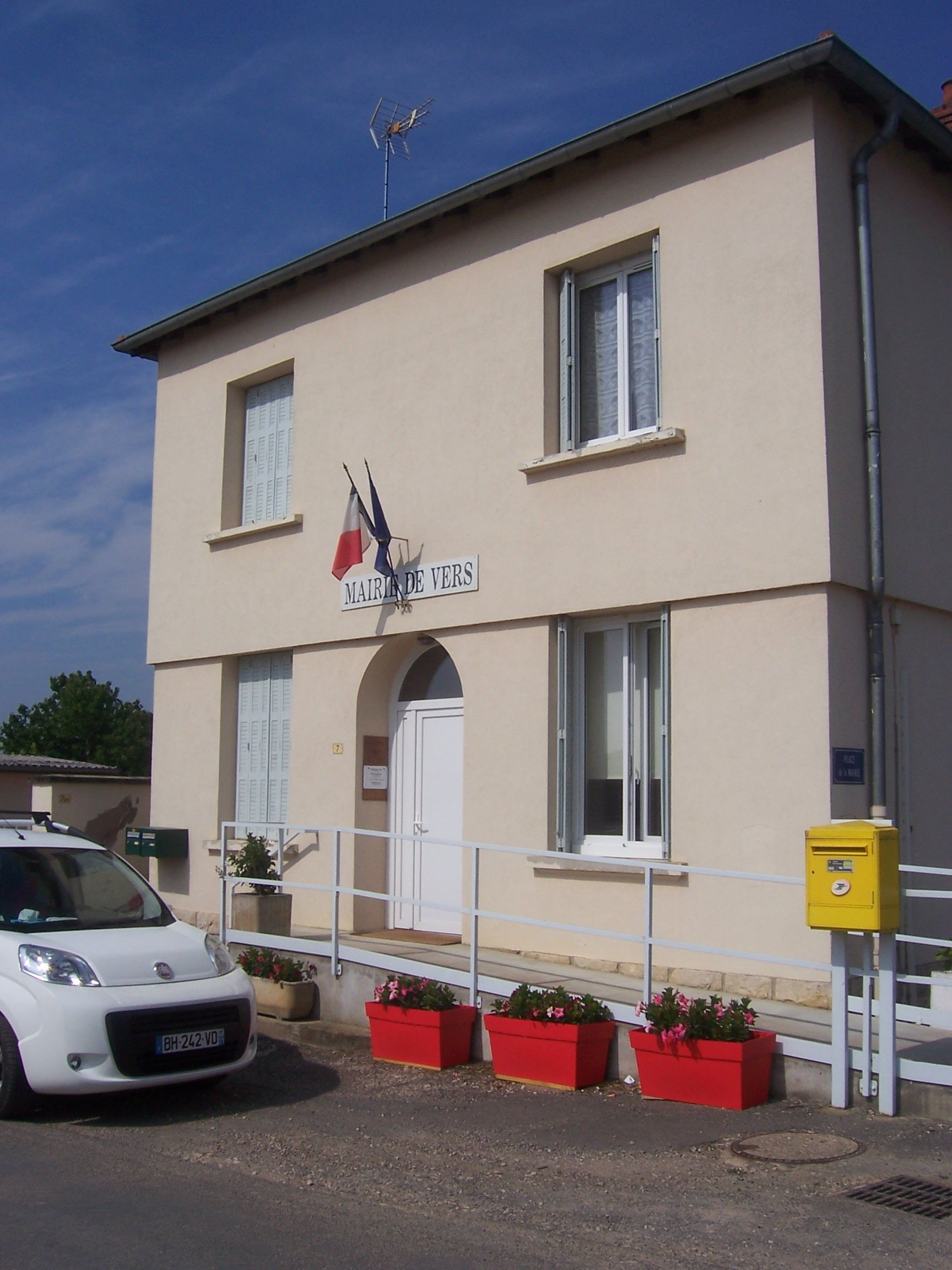
- Town hall
- Location of Vers
- Location within France Location within Bourgogne-Franche-Comté
- Coordinates: 46°35′04″N 4°51′25″E
- Country: France
- Region: Bourgogne-Franche-Comté
- Department: Saône-et-Loire
- Arrondissement: Chalon-sur-Saône
- Canton: Tournus
- Area^{1}: 4.18 km^{2} (1.61 sq mi)
- Elevation: 260 m (850 ft)
- Highest elevation: 462 m (1,516 ft)
- Lowest elevation: 203 m (666 ft)
- Population (2023): 234
  - Density: 56.0/km^{2} (145/sq mi)
- Time zone: UTC+01:00 (CET)
  - Summer (DST): UTC+02:00 (CEST)
- INSEE/Postal code: 71572 /71240
- ^{1} French Land Register data, which excludes lakes, ponds, glaciers > 1 km^{2} (0.386 sq mi or 247 acres) and river estuaries.

Vers is a commune in the Saône-et-Loire department in the region of Bourgogne-Franche-Comté in eastern France.

== See also ==
- Communes of the Saône-et-Loire department
