= Beaumont-sur-Grosne =

- Commune
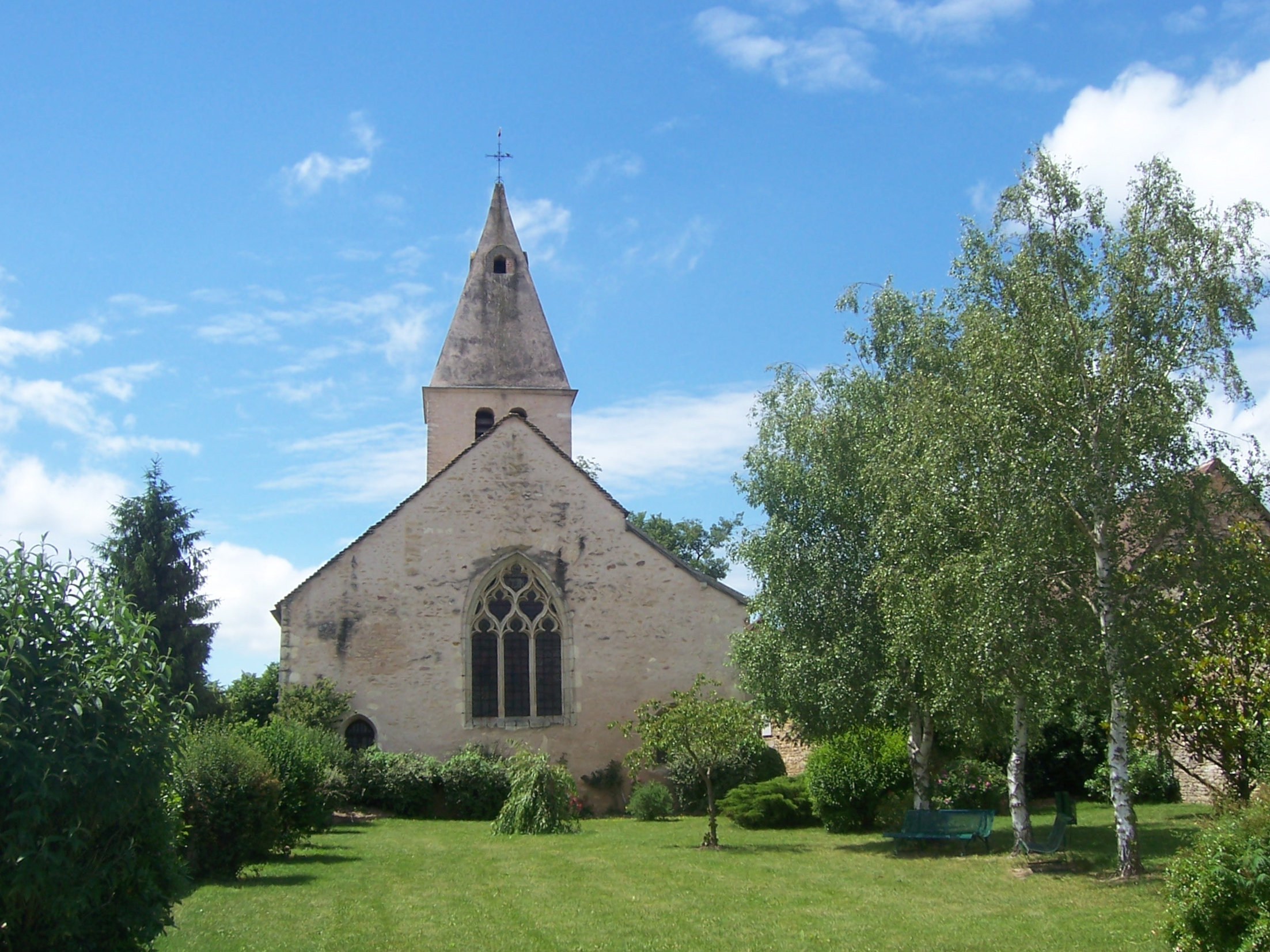
- Location of Beaumont-sur-Grosne
- Location within France Location within Bourgogne-Franche-Comté
- Coordinates: 46°39′55″N 4°51′37″E
- Country: France
- Region: Bourgogne-Franche-Comté
- Department: Saône-et-Loire
- Arrondissement: Chalon-sur-Saône
- Canton: Tournus
- Intercommunality: entre Saône et Grosne

Government
  - Mayor (2020–2026): Laurent Ginnetti
- Area^{1}: 7.82 km^{2} (3.02 sq mi)
- Elevation: 190 m (620 ft)
- Highest elevation: 217 m (712 ft)
- Lowest elevation: 175 m (574 ft)
- Population (2023): 334
  - Density: 42.7/km^{2} (111/sq mi)
- Time zone: UTC+01:00 (CET)
  - Summer (DST): UTC+02:00 (CEST)
- INSEE/Postal code: 71026 /71240
- ^{1} French Land Register data, which excludes lakes, ponds, glaciers > 1 km^{2} (0.386 sq mi or 247 acres) and river estuaries.

Beaumont-sur-Grosne (French pronunciation: [bomɔ̃ syʁ ɡʁon], literally Beaumont on Grosne) is a commune in the Saône-et-Loire department in the region of Bourgogne-Franche-Comté in eastern France.

== Geography ==
The river Grosne forms all of the commune's northwestern border.

== Population ==
Historical population
Year	Pop.	±% p.a.
1968	201	—
1975	186	−1.10%
1982	247	+4.14%
1990	257	+0.50%
1999	269	+0.51%
2007	307	+1.67%
2012	337	+1.88%
2017	347	+0.59%
2023	334	−0.63%
Source: INSEE

== See also ==
- Communes of the Saône-et-Loire department
