= Préty =

- Commune
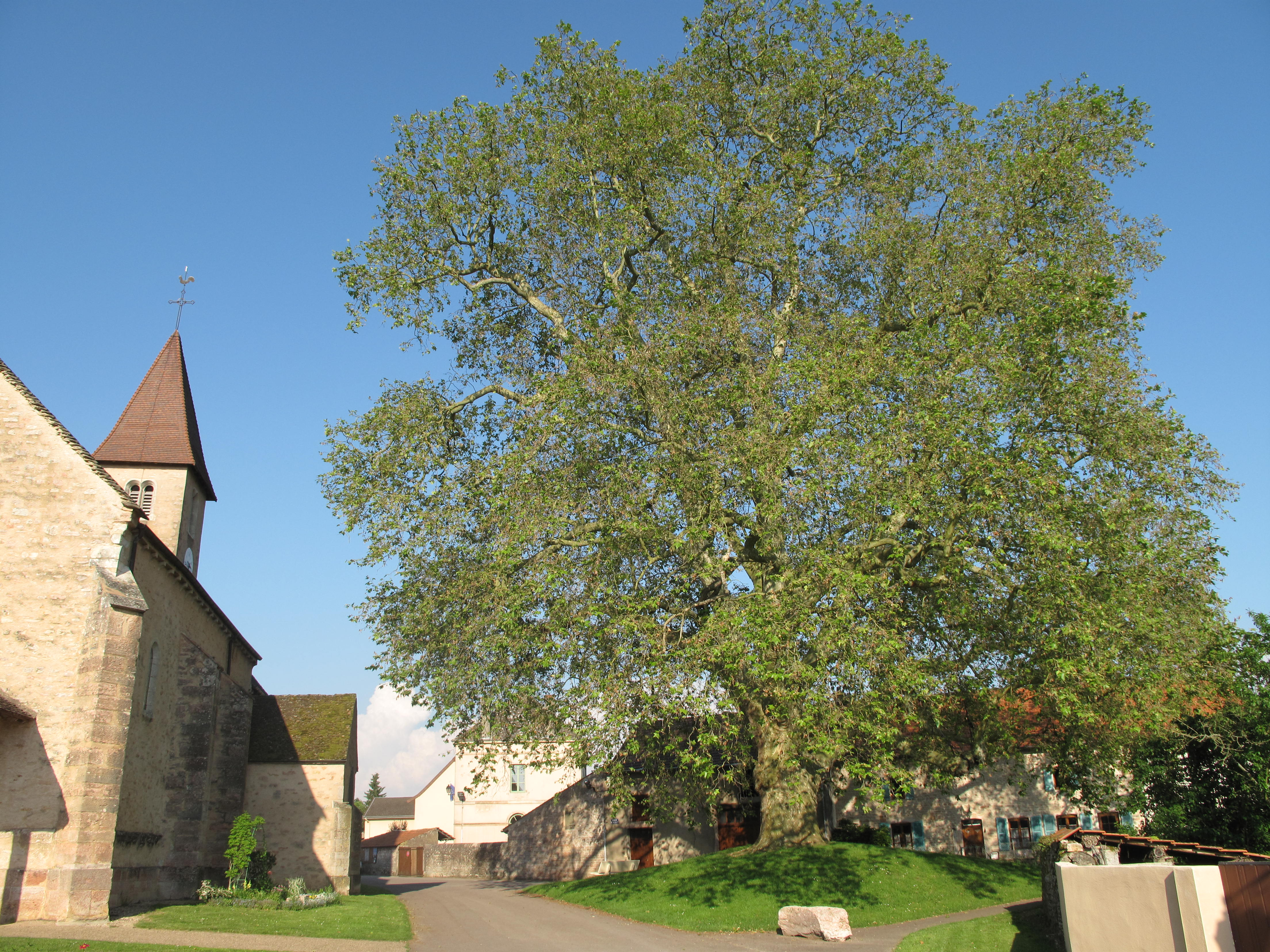
- The church and surroundings in Préty

- Coat of arms
- Location of Préty
- Location within France Location within Bourgogne-Franche-Comté
- Coordinates: 46°32′39″N 4°56′36″E
- Country: France
- Region: Bourgogne-Franche-Comté
- Department: Saône-et-Loire
- Arrondissement: Mâcon
- Canton: Tournus
- Area^{1}: 12.4 km^{2} (4.8 sq mi)
- Elevation: 193 m (633 ft)
- Highest elevation: 212 m (696 ft)
- Lowest elevation: 167 m (548 ft)
- Population (2023): 582
  - Density: 46.9/km^{2} (122/sq mi)
- Time zone: UTC+01:00 (CET)
  - Summer (DST): UTC+02:00 (CEST)
- INSEE/Postal code: 71359 /71290
- ^{1} French Land Register data, which excludes lakes, ponds, glaciers > 1 km^{2} (0.386 sq mi or 247 acres) and river estuaries.

Préty (French pronunciation: [pʁeti]) is a commune in the Saône-et-Loire department in the region of Bourgogne-Franche-Comté in eastern France.

== See also ==
- Communes of the Saône-et-Loire department
