= Gigny-sur-Saône =

- Commune
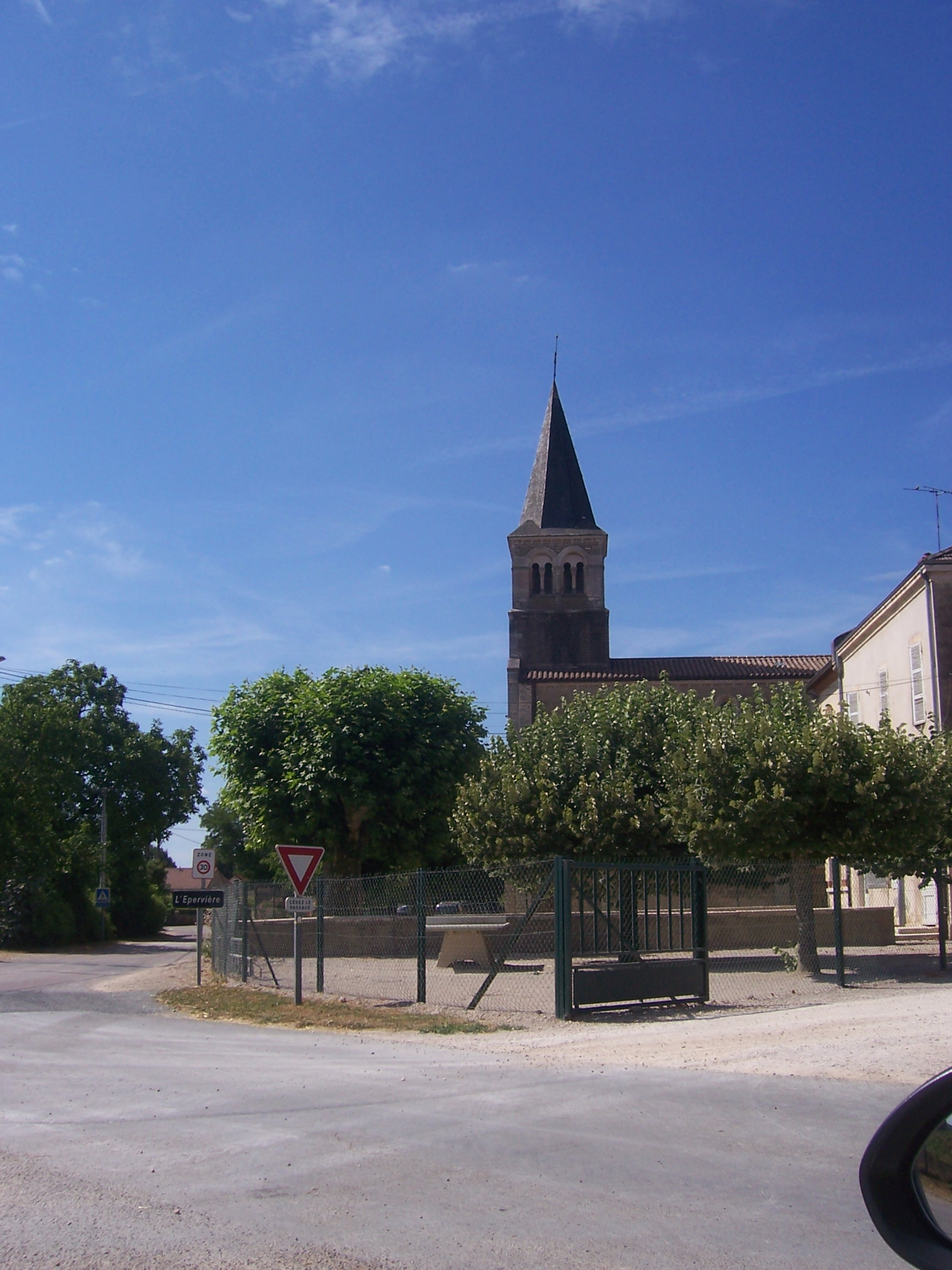
- The church in Gigny-sur-Saône
- Location of Gigny-sur-Saône
- Location within France Location within Bourgogne-Franche-Comté
- Coordinates: 46°39′43″N 4°56′49″E
- Country: France
- Region: Bourgogne-Franche-Comté
- Department: Saône-et-Loire
- Arrondissement: Chalon-sur-Saône
- Canton: Tournus
- Area^{1}: 14.36 km^{2} (5.54 sq mi)
- Elevation: 180 m (590 ft)
- Highest elevation: 183 m (600 ft)
- Lowest elevation: 167 m (548 ft)
- Population (2023): 580
  - Density: 40/km^{2} (100/sq mi)
- Time zone: UTC+01:00 (CET)
  - Summer (DST): UTC+02:00 (CEST)
- INSEE/Postal code: 71219 /71240
- ^{1} French Land Register data, which excludes lakes, ponds, glaciers > 1 km^{2} (0.386 sq mi or 247 acres) and river estuaries.

Gigny-sur-Saône (French pronunciation: [ʒiɲi syʁ son], literally Gigny on Saône) is a commune in the Saône-et-Loire department in the region of Bourgogne-Franche-Comté in eastern France.

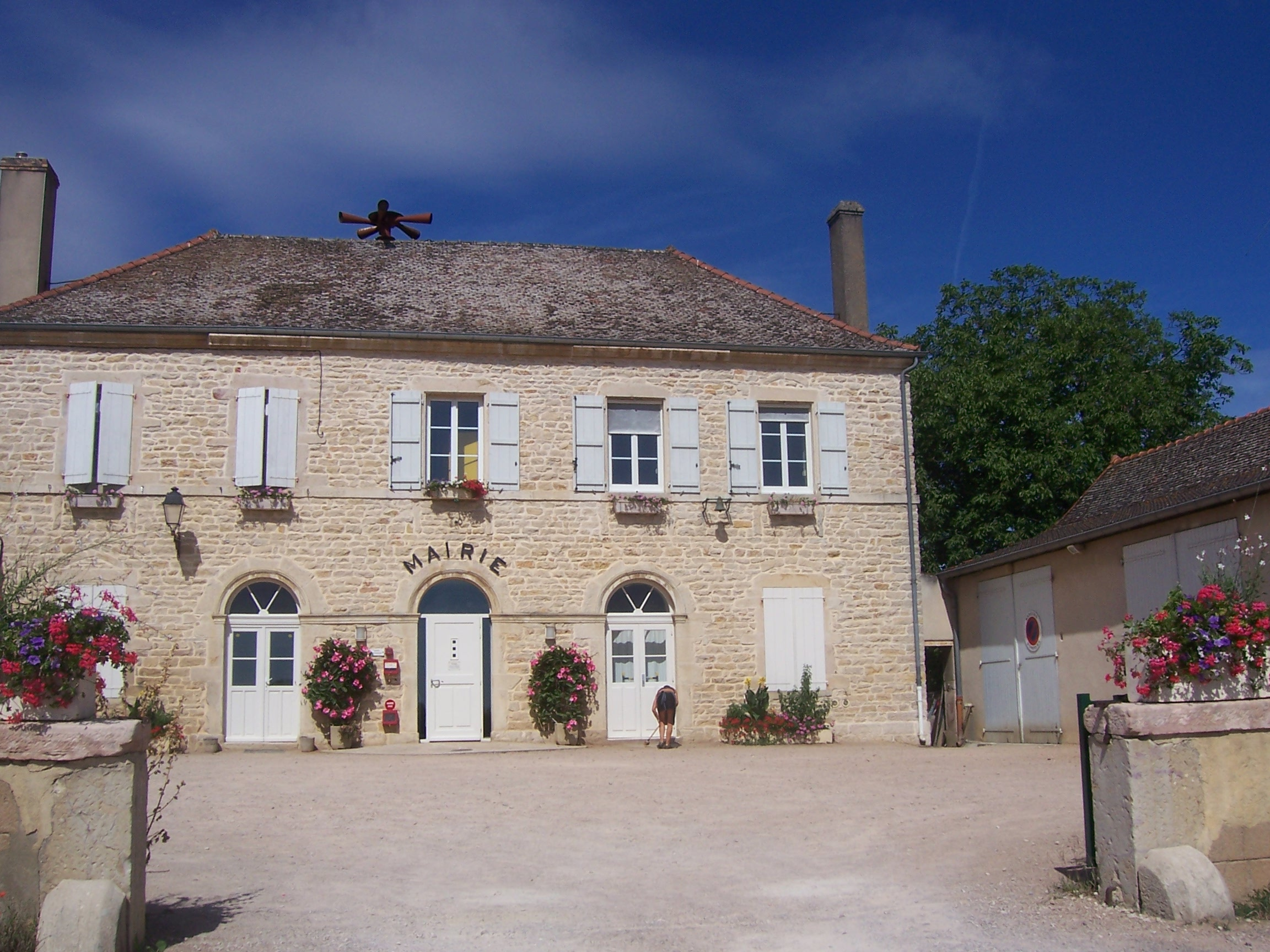
Town hall

== See also ==
- Communes of the Saône-et-Loire department
