= Sennecey-le-Grand =

- Commune
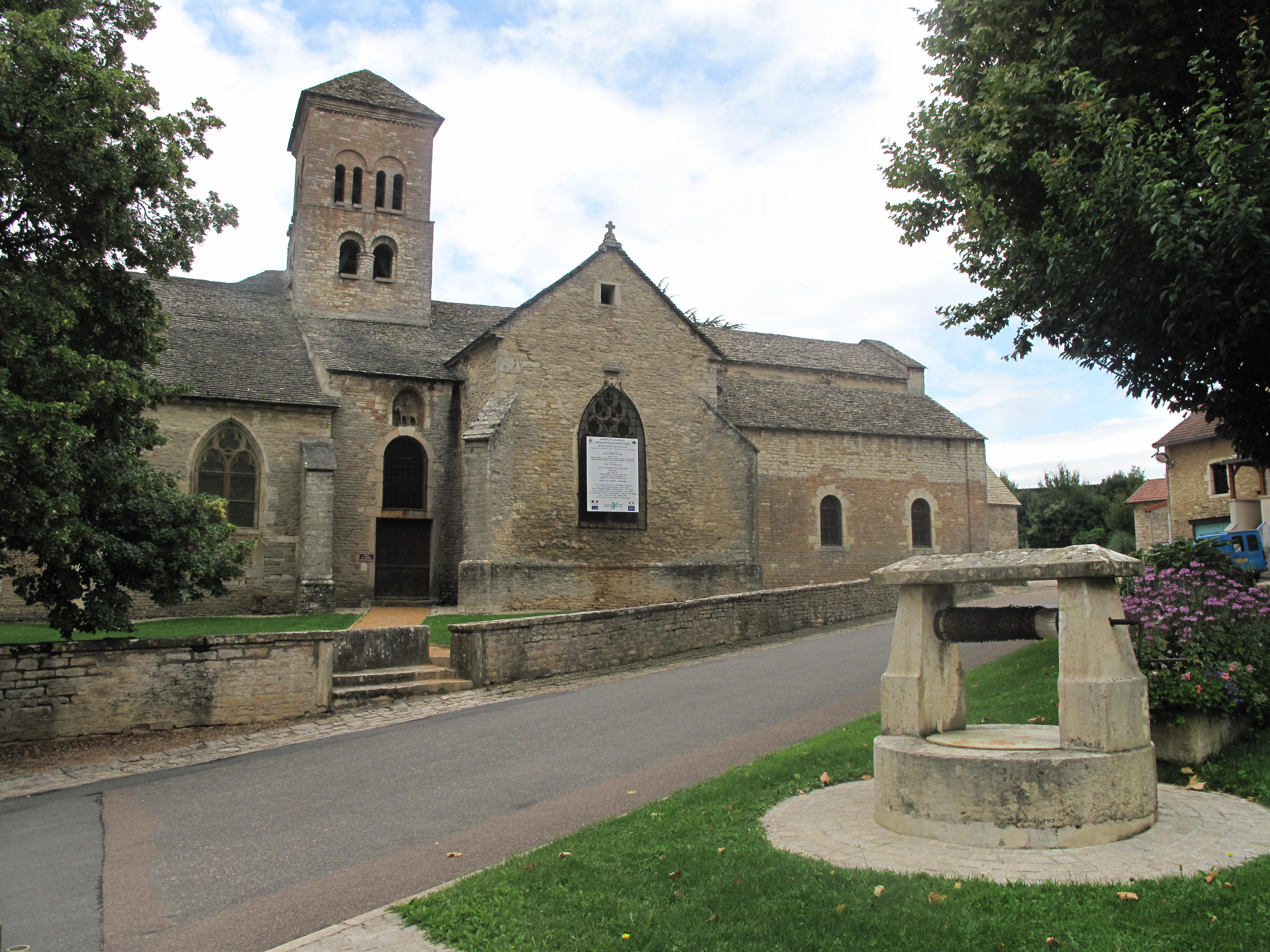
- The church in Sennecey-le-Grand

- Coat of arms
- Location of Sennecey-le-Grand
- Location within France Location within Bourgogne-Franche-Comté
- Coordinates: 46°38′36″N 4°52′16″E
- Country: France
- Region: Bourgogne-Franche-Comté
- Department: Saône-et-Loire
- Arrondissement: Chalon-sur-Saône
- Canton: Tournus
- Area^{1}: 26.76 km^{2} (10.33 sq mi)
- Elevation: 230 m (750 ft)
- Highest elevation: 375 m (1,230 ft)
- Lowest elevation: 173 m (568 ft)
- Population (2023): 2,895
  - Density: 108.2/km^{2} (280.2/sq mi)
- Time zone: UTC+01:00 (CET)
  - Summer (DST): UTC+02:00 (CEST)
- INSEE/Postal code: 71512 /71240
- ^{1} French Land Register data, which excludes lakes, ponds, glaciers > 1 km^{2} (0.386 sq mi or 247 acres) and river estuaries.

Sennecey-le-Grand (French pronunciation: [sɛnsɛ l(ə) ɡʁɑ̃]; lit. 'Sennecey-the-Great') is a commune in the Saône-et-Loire department in the region of Bourgogne-Franche-Comté in eastern France.

== Population ==
Historical population
Year	Pop.	±% p.a.
1968	2,116	—
1975	2,269	+1.00%
1982	2,372	+0.64%
1990	2,568	+1.00%
1999	2,962	+1.60%
2007	2,988	+0.11%
2012	3,126	+0.91%
2017	3,149	+0.15%
2023	2,895	−1.39%
Source: INSEE

== Second World War SAS memorial ==
On 4 September 1984 a war memorial was unveiled to commemorate the WW2 casualties of the Special Air Service. Listing all of those from British 1SAS and 2SAS, including those who fell at Sennecey-le-Grand on 4 September 1944, French 3SAS and 4SAS and Belgian 5SAS, it is the only memorial to all components of a British regiment to exist outside of the UK.

== See also ==
- Communes of the Saône-et-Loire department
