= Saint-Ambreuil =

- Commune
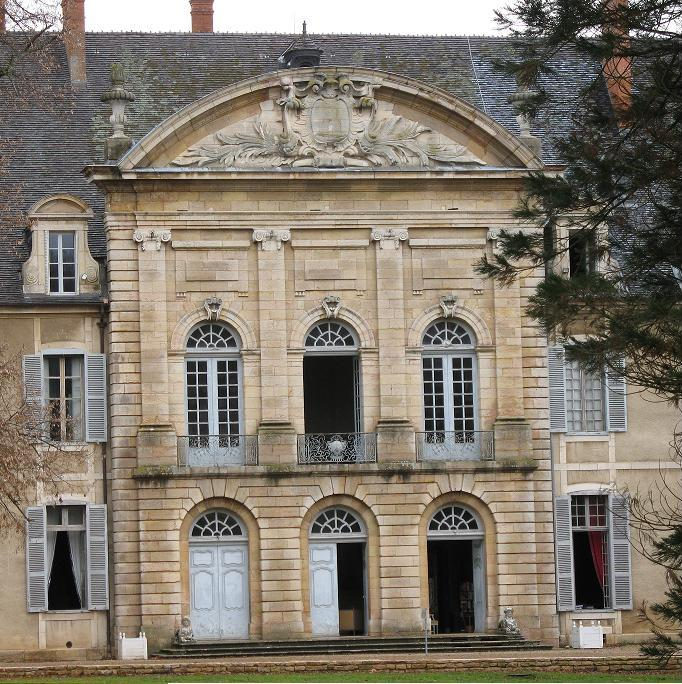
- Chateau of La Ferté
- Location of Saint-Ambreuil
- Location within France Location within Bourgogne-Franche-Comté
- Coordinates: 46°41′33″N 4°51′38″E
- Country: France
- Region: Bourgogne-Franche-Comté
- Department: Saône-et-Loire
- Arrondissement: Chalon-sur-Saône
- Canton: Tournus
- Area^{1}: 18.26 km^{2} (7.05 sq mi)
- Elevation: 190 m (620 ft)
- Highest elevation: 217 m (712 ft)
- Lowest elevation: 175 m (574 ft)
- Population (2023): 523
  - Density: 28.6/km^{2} (74.2/sq mi)
- Time zone: UTC+01:00 (CET)
  - Summer (DST): UTC+02:00 (CEST)
- INSEE/Postal code: 71384 /71240
- ^{1} French Land Register data, which excludes lakes, ponds, glaciers > 1 km^{2} (0.386 sq mi or 247 acres) and river estuaries.

Saint-Ambreuil (French pronunciation: [sɛ̃.t‿ɑ̃bʁœj]) is a commune in the Saône-et-Loire department in the region of Bourgogne-Franche-Comté in eastern France.

== Geography ==
The Grosne forms the commune's north-western border.

== See also ==
- Communes of the Saône-et-Loire department
