= Nanton, Saône-et-Loire =

Nanton
- Commune
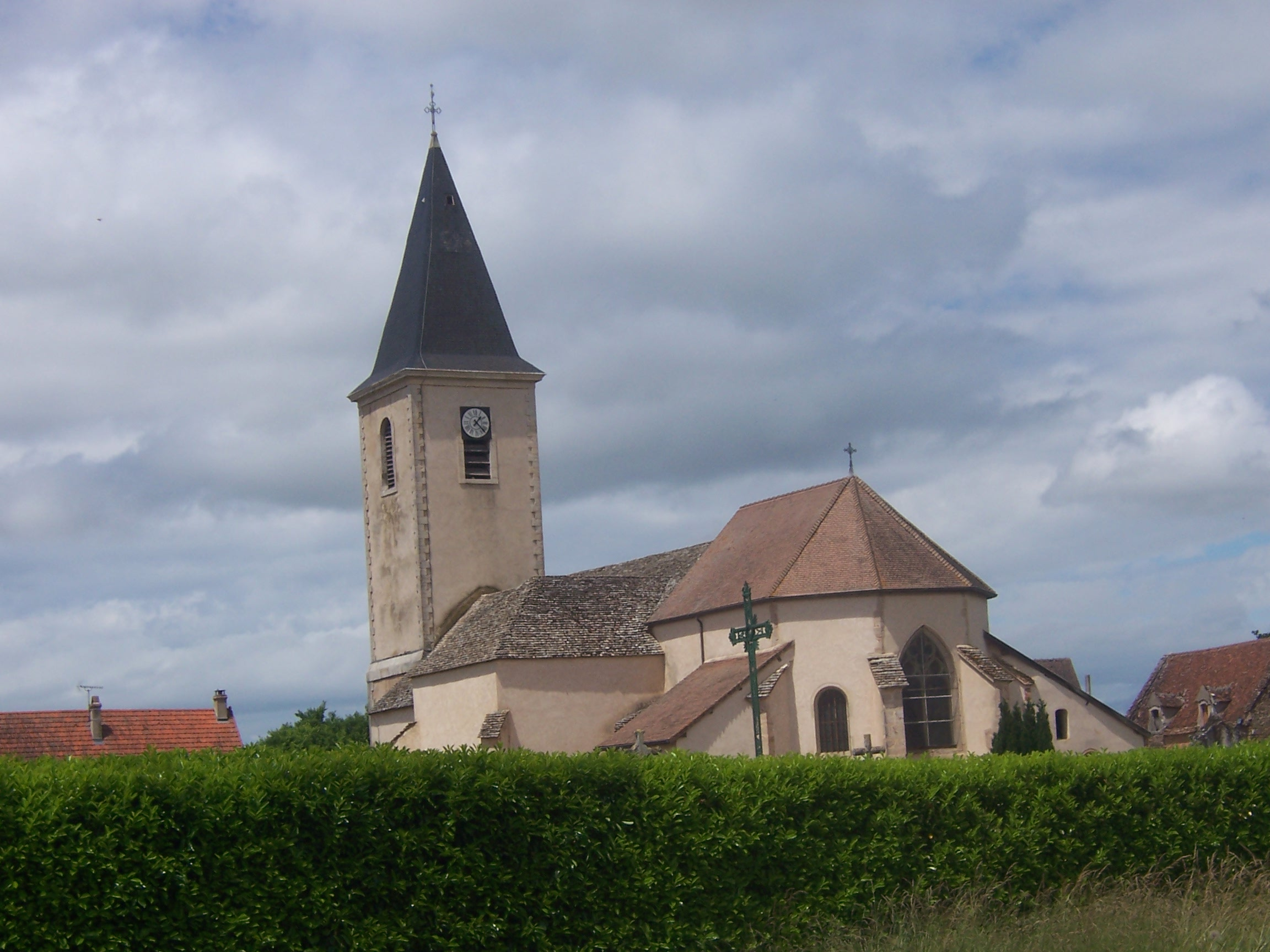
- The church in Nanton
- Location of Nanton
- Location within France Location within Bourgogne-Franche-Comté
- Coordinates: 46°37′14″N 4°49′01″E
- Country: France
- Region: Bourgogne-Franche-Comté
- Department: Saône-et-Loire
- Arrondissement: Chalon-sur-Saône
- Canton: Tournus
- Area^{1}: 14.03 km^{2} (5.42 sq mi)
- Elevation: 230 m (750 ft)
- Highest elevation: 476 m (1,562 ft)
- Lowest elevation: 182 m (597 ft)
- Population (2023): 666
  - Density: 47.5/km^{2} (123/sq mi)
- Time zone: UTC+01:00 (CET)
  - Summer (DST): UTC+02:00 (CEST)
- INSEE/Postal code: 71328 /71240
- ^{1} French Land Register data, which excludes lakes, ponds, glaciers > 1 km^{2} (0.386 sq mi or 247 acres) and river estuaries.

Nanton (French pronunciation: [nɑ̃tɔ̃]) is a commune in the Saône-et-Loire department in the region of Bourgogne-Franche-Comté in eastern France.

== See also ==
- Communes of the Saône-et-Loire department
