= Oudry =

Oudry may refer to:

== People ==
- Jean-Baptiste Oudry (1686–1755), French Rococo painter, engraver, and tapestry designer
- Marie-Marguerite Oudry (1688–1780), French engraver and painter

== Places ==
- Oudry, Saône-et-Loire, commune in the Saône-et-Loire department in the region of Bourgogne in eastern France
