= Vendenesse-lès-Charolles =

- Commune
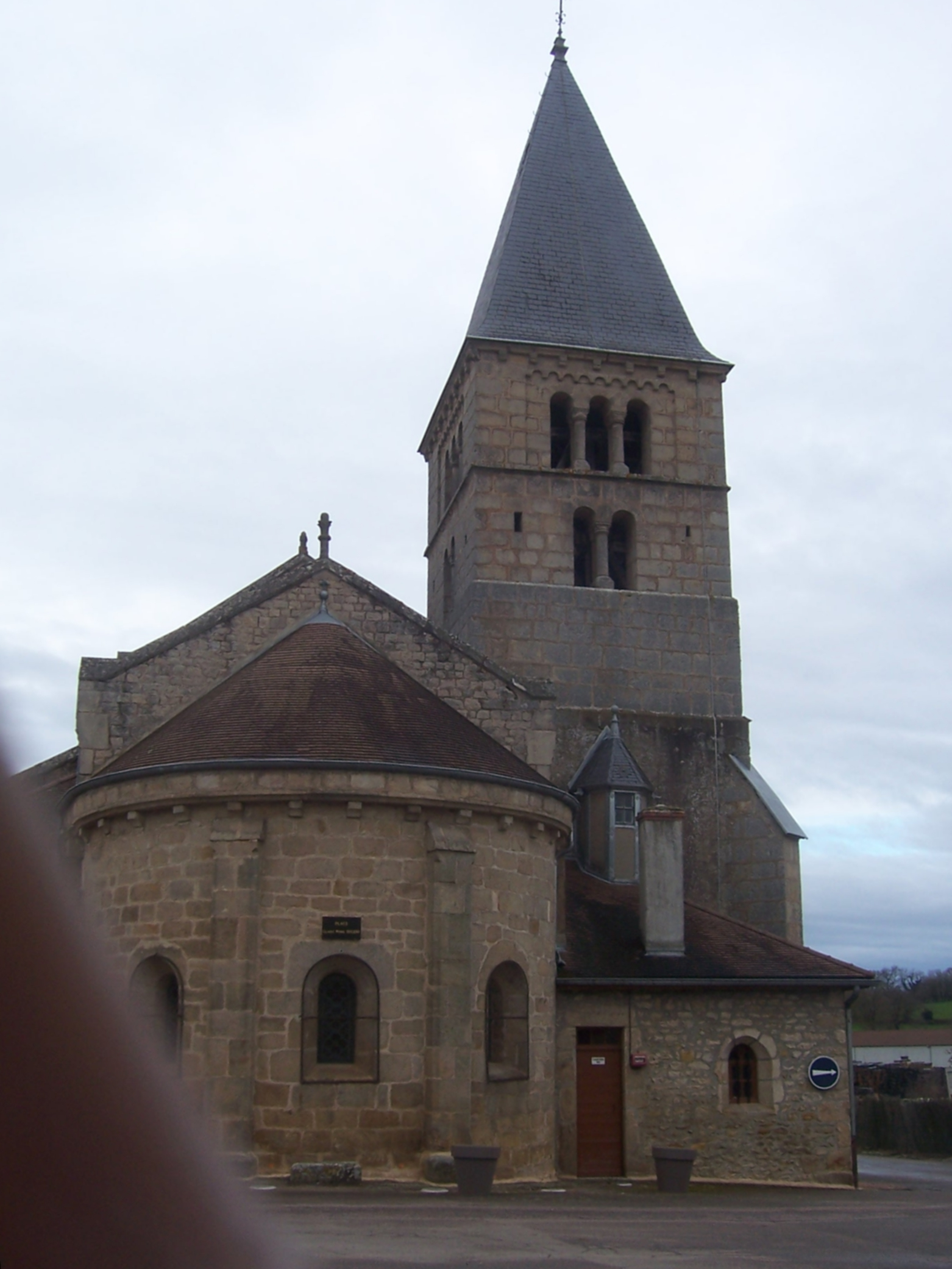
- The church in Vendenesse-lès-Charolles
- Location of Vendenesse-lès-Charolles
- Location within France Location within Bourgogne-Franche-Comté
- Coordinates: 46°26′34″N 4°20′18″E
- Country: France
- Region: Bourgogne-Franche-Comté
- Department: Saône-et-Loire
- Arrondissement: Charolles
- Canton: Charolles

Government
  - Mayor (2020–2026): Jean-Louis Petit
- Area^{1}: 27.38 km^{2} (10.57 sq mi)
- Elevation: 307 m (1,007 ft)
- Highest elevation: 403 m (1,322 ft)
- Lowest elevation: 282 m (925 ft)
- Population (2023): 729
  - Density: 26.6/km^{2} (69.0/sq mi)
- Time zone: UTC+01:00 (CET)
  - Summer (DST): UTC+02:00 (CEST)
- INSEE/Postal code: 71564 /71120
- ^{1} French Land Register data, which excludes lakes, ponds, glaciers > 1 km^{2} (0.386 sq mi or 247 acres) and river estuaries.

Vendenesse-lès-Charolles (French pronunciation: [vɑ̃dnɛs lɛ ʃaʁɔl], literally Vendenesse near Charolles) is a commune in the Saône-et-Loire department in the region of Bourgogne-Franche-Comté in eastern France.

== See also ==
- Communes of the Saône-et-Loire department
