= Baudemont =

- Commune
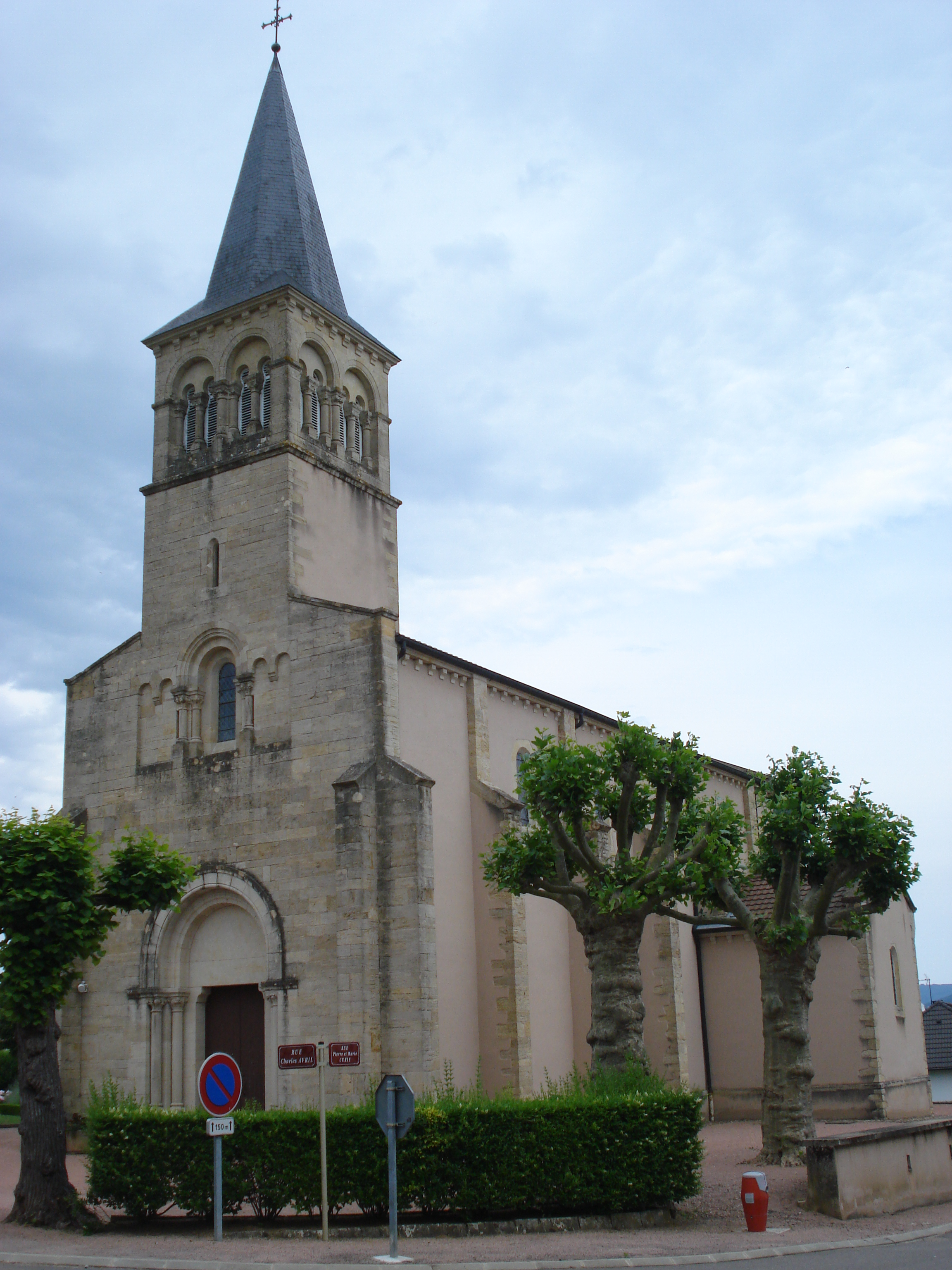
- Location of Baudemont
- Location within France Location within Bourgogne-Franche-Comté
- Coordinates: 46°17′17″N 4°17′10″E
- Country: France
- Region: Bourgogne-Franche-Comté
- Department: Saône-et-Loire
- Arrondissement: Charolles
- Canton: Chauffailles
- Intercommunality: CC Brionnais Sud Bourgogne

Government
  - Mayor (2020–2026): Robert Thomas
- Area^{1}: 7.97 km^{2} (3.08 sq mi)
- Elevation: 400 m (1,300 ft)
- Highest elevation: 442 m (1,450 ft)
- Lowest elevation: 333 m (1,093 ft)
- Population (2023): 627
  - Density: 78.7/km^{2} (204/sq mi)
- Time zone: UTC+01:00 (CET)
  - Summer (DST): UTC+02:00 (CEST)
- INSEE/Postal code: 71022 /71800
- ^{1} French Land Register data, which excludes lakes, ponds, glaciers > 1 km^{2} (0.386 sq mi or 247 acres) and river estuaries.

Baudemont (French pronunciation: [bodmɔ̃]) is a commune in the Saône-et-Loire department in the region of Bourgogne-Franche-Comté in eastern France.

== Geography ==
The communes lies in the south of the department near Charolles.

== Population ==
Historical population
Year	Pop.	±% p.a.
1968	518	—
1975	627	+2.77%
1982	655	+0.63%
1990	641	−0.27%
1999	708	+1.11%
2007	691	−0.30%
2012	666	−0.73%
2017	640	−0.79%
2023	627	−0.34%
Source: INSEE

== See also ==
- Communes of the Saône-et-Loire department
