= Baron, Saône-et-Loire =

Baron
- Commune
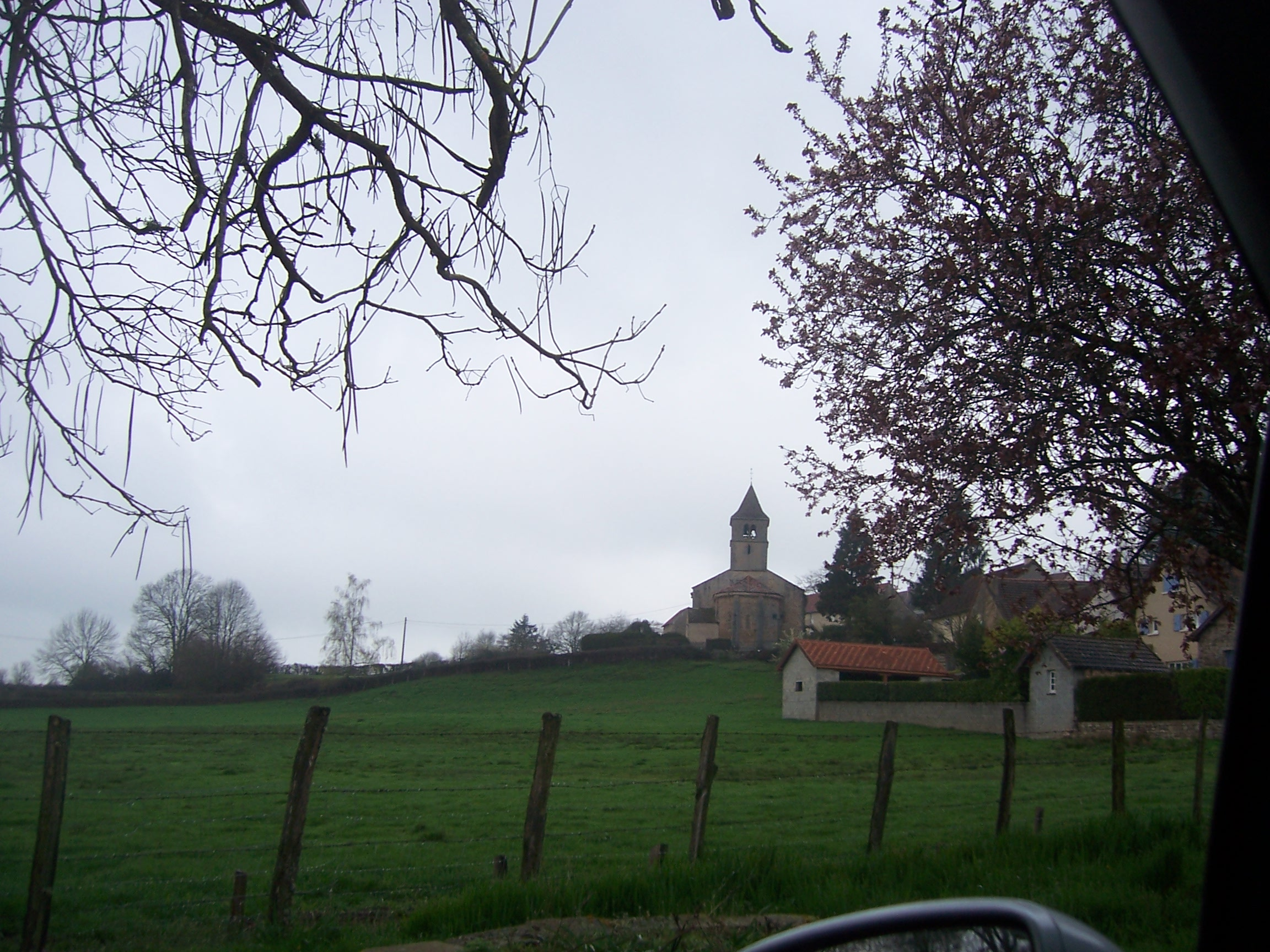
- Location of Baron
- Location within France Location within Bourgogne-Franche-Comté
- Coordinates: 46°29′37″N 4°16′46″E
- Country: France
- Region: Bourgogne-Franche-Comté
- Department: Saône-et-Loire
- Arrondissement: Charolles
- Canton: Charolles

Government
  - Mayor (2020–2026): Thierry Auclair
- Area^{1}: 13.29 km^{2} (5.13 sq mi)
- Elevation: 400 m (1,300 ft)
- Highest elevation: 446 m (1,463 ft)
- Lowest elevation: 282 m (925 ft)
- Population (2023): 274
  - Density: 20.6/km^{2} (53.4/sq mi)
- Time zone: UTC+01:00 (CET)
  - Summer (DST): UTC+02:00 (CEST)
- INSEE/Postal code: 71021 /71120
- ^{1} French Land Register data, which excludes lakes, ponds, glaciers > 1 km^{2} (0.386 sq mi or 247 acres) and river estuaries.

Baron (French pronunciation: [baʁɔ̃]) is a commune in the Saône-et-Loire department in the region of Bourgogne-Franche-Comté in eastern France.

== Geography ==
The communes lies in the south of the department near Charolles.

== Population ==
Historical population
Year	Pop.	±% p.a.
1968	185	—
1975	148	−3.14%
1982	153	+0.48%
1990	184	+2.33%
1999	217	+1.85%
2007	274	+2.96%
2012	296	+1.56%
2017	292	−0.27%
2023	274	−1.05%
Source: INSEE

== See also ==
- Communes of the Saône-et-Loire department
