= Mornay =

Mornay may refer to:

== People ==
- Charles-Edgar de Mornay
- Pierre de Mornay (d. 1306), bishop of Orleans & Auxerre and chancellor of France
- Philippe de Mornay
- Rebecca De Mornay, American film and television actress

== Places ==
- Mornay, the estate of the De Mornay lords, near Nérondes, Cher, France
- Mornay, Saône-et-Loire, a commune in the French region of Bourgogne

== Other ==
- Mornay sauce

== See also ==
- Melchie Dumornay
