= Viry =

Viry may refer to:

== Communes of France ==
- Viry, Jura
- Viry, Saône-et-Loire
- Viry, Haute-Savoie
- Viry-Châtillon, Essonne
- Viry-Noureuil, Aisne
- Saint-Parize-en-Viry, Nièvre

=== People ===
- Stéphane Viry (born 1969), French politician
