= Beaubery =

- Commune
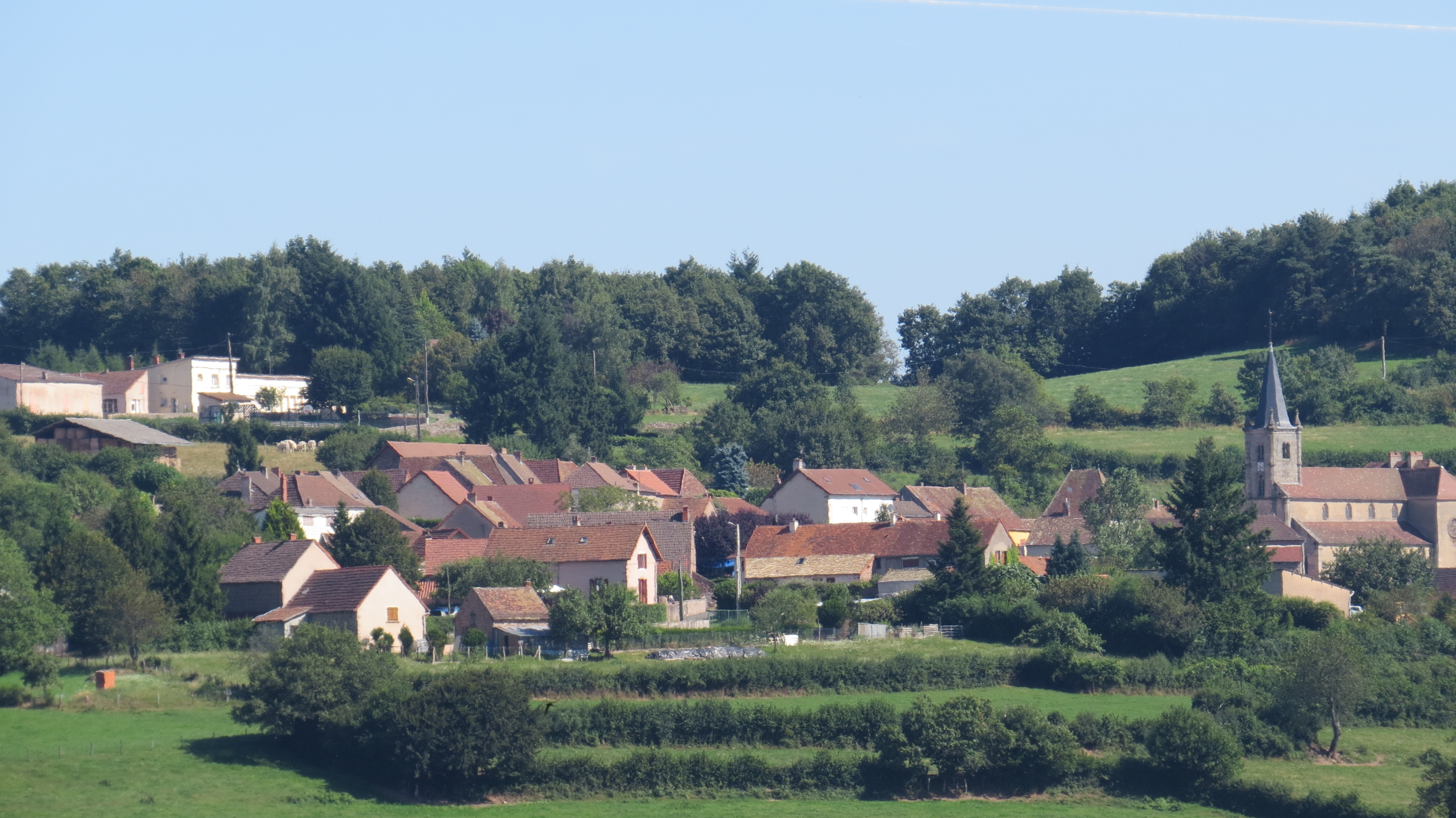
- Location of Beaubery
- Location within France Location within Bourgogne-Franche-Comté
- Coordinates: 46°24′14″N 4°23′56″E
- Country: France
- Region: Bourgogne-Franche-Comté
- Department: Saône-et-Loire
- Arrondissement: Charolles
- Canton: Charolles

Government
  - Mayor (2020–2026): Gérard Duchet
- Area^{1}: 22.98 km^{2} (8.87 sq mi)
- Elevation: 510 m (1,670 ft)
- Highest elevation: 555 m (1,821 ft)
- Lowest elevation: 312 m (1,024 ft)
- Population (2023): 366
  - Density: 15.9/km^{2} (41.3/sq mi)
- Time zone: UTC+01:00 (CET)
  - Summer (DST): UTC+02:00 (CEST)
- INSEE/Postal code: 71025 /71220
- ^{1} French Land Register data, which excludes lakes, ponds, glaciers > 1 km^{2} (0.386 sq mi or 247 acres) and river estuaries.

Beaubery (French pronunciation: [bobʁi]) is a commune in the Saône-et-Loire department in the region of Bourgogne-Franche-Comté in eastern France.

== Geography ==
The commune lies in the south of the department near Charolles.

== Population ==
Historical population
Year	Pop.	±% p.a.
1968	509	—
1975	445	−1.90%
1982	419	−0.86%
1990	392	−0.83%
1999	357	−1.03%
2007	349	−0.28%
2012	373	+1.34%
2017	367	−0.32%
2023	366	−0.05%
Source: INSEE

== See also ==
- Communes of the Saône-et-Loire department
