= Arrondissement of Charolles =

Coordinates: 46°26′04″N 4°16′31″E

Charolles
- Arrondissement
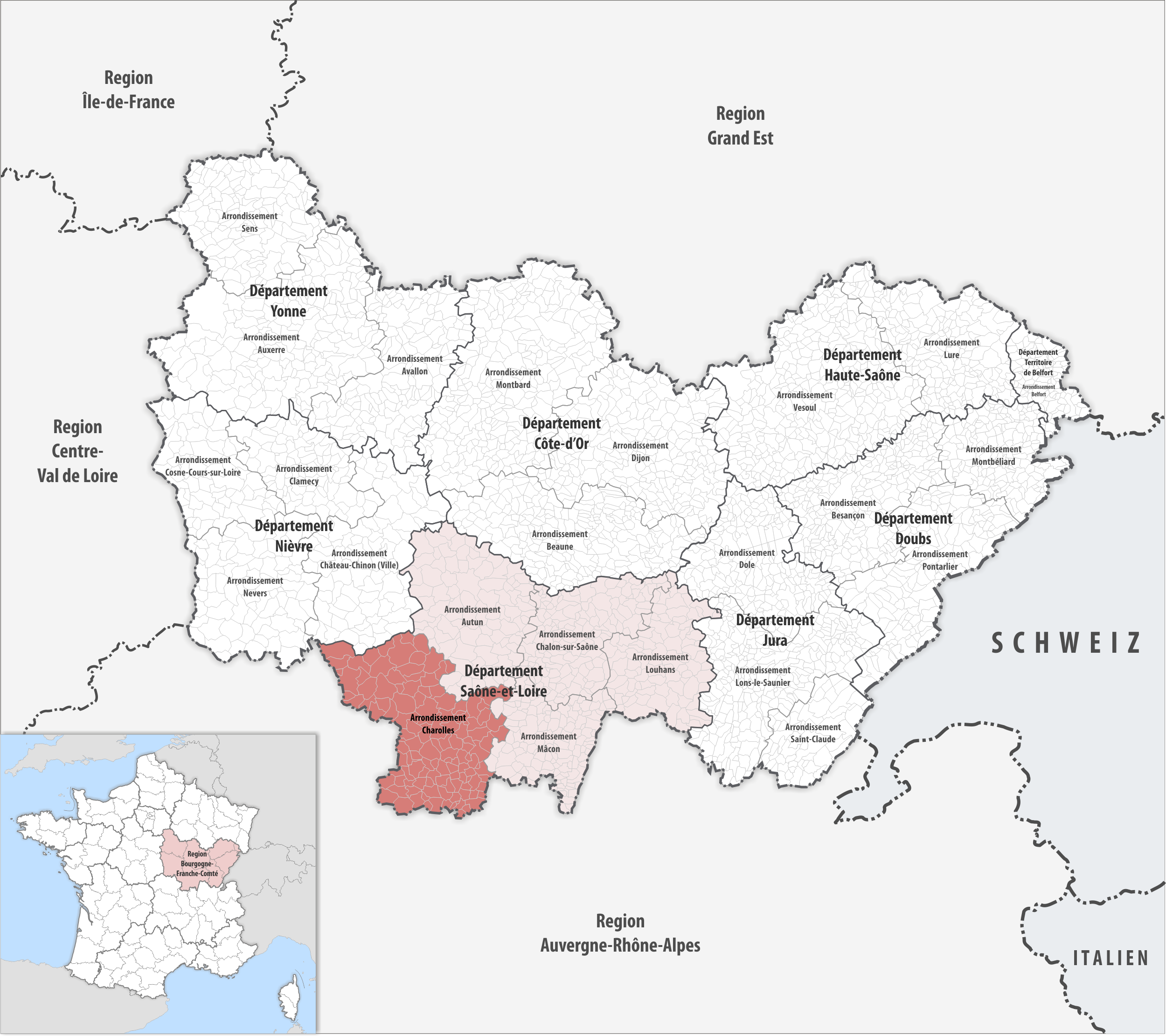
- Location within the region Bourgogne-Franche-Comté
- Country: France
- Region: Bourgogne-Franche-Comté
- Department: Saône-et-Loire
- No. of communes: {{{nbcomm}}}
- Area: 2,443.8 km^{2} (943.6 sq mi)
- Population (2023): 84,593
  - Density: 34.615/km^{2} (89.653/sq mi)
- INSEE code: 713

The arrondissement of Charolles is an arrondissement of France in the Saône-et-Loire department in the Bourgogne-Franche-Comté region. It has 126 communes. Its population is 85,124 (2021), and its area is 2,443.8 km^{2} (943.6 sq mi).

== Composition ==
The communes of the arrondissement of Charolles, and their INSEE codes, are:

1. Amanzé (71006)
2. Anglure-sous-Dun (71008)
3. Anzy-le-Duc (71011)
4. Artaix (71012)
5. Ballore (71017)
6. Baron (71021)
7. Baudemont (71022)
8. Baugy (71024)
9. Beaubery (71025)
10. Bois-Sainte-Marie (71041)
11. Bourbon-Lancy (71047)
12. Bourg-le-Comte (71048)
13. Briant (71060)
14. Céron (71071)
15. Chalmoux (71075)
16. Chambilly (71077)
17. Champlecy (71082)
18. Changy (71086)
19. La Chapelle-au-Mans (71088)
20. La Chapelle-sous-Dun (71095)
21. Charolles (71106)
22. Chassigny-sous-Dun (71110)
23. Chassy (71111)
24. Châteauneuf (71113)
25. Châtenay (71116)
26. Chauffailles (71120)
27. Chenay-le-Châtel (71123)
28. La Clayette (71133)
29. Clessy (71136)
30. Colombier-en-Brionnais (71141)
31. Coublanc (71148)
32. Cressy-sur-Somme (71152)
33. Cronat (71155)
34. Curbigny (71160)
35. Curdin (71161)
36. Cuzy (71166)
37. Digoin (71176)
38. Dompierre-sous-Sanvignes (71179)
39. Dyo (71185)
40. Fleury-la-Montagne (71200)
41. Fontenay (71203)
42. Gibles (71218)
43. Gilly-sur-Loire (71220)
44. Grandvaux (71224)
45. Grury (71227)
46. Les Guerreaux (71229)
47. Gueugnon (71230)
48. Hautefond (71232)
49. L'Hôpital-le-Mercier (71233)
50. Iguerande (71238)
51. Issy-l'Évêque (71239)
52. Lesme (71255)
53. Ligny-en-Brionnais (71259)
54. Lugny-lès-Charolles (71268)
55. Mailly (71271)
56. Maltat (71273)
57. Marcigny (71275)
58. Marcilly-la-Gueurce (71276)
59. Marly-sous-Issy (71280)
60. Marly-sur-Arroux (71281)
61. Martigny-le-Comte (71285)
62. Melay (71291)
63. Mont (71301)
64. Montceaux-l'Étoile (71307)
65. Montmort (71317)
66. Mornay (71323)
67. La Motte-Saint-Jean (71325)
68. Mussy-sous-Dun (71327)
69. Neuvy-Grandchamp (71330)
70. Nochize (71331)
71. Oudry (71334)
72. Ouroux-sous-le-Bois-Sainte-Marie (71335)
73. Oyé (71337)
74. Ozolles (71339)
75. Palinges (71340)
76. Paray-le-Monial (71342)
77. Perrigny-sur-Loire (71348)
78. Poisson (71354)
79. Prizy (71361)
80. Rigny-sur-Arroux (71370)
81. Le Rousset-Marizy (71279)
82. Saint-Agnan (71382)
83. Saint-Aubin-en-Charollais (71388)
84. Saint-Aubin-sur-Loire (71389)
85. Saint-Bonnet-de-Cray (71393)
86. Saint-Bonnet-de-Joux (71394)
87. Saint-Bonnet-de-Vieille-Vigne (71395)
88. Saint-Christophe-en-Brionnais (71399)
89. Saint-Didier-en-Brionnais (71406)
90. Saint-Edmond (71408)
91. Sainte-Foy (71415)
92. Sainte-Radegonde (71474)
93. Saint-Germain-en-Brionnais (71421)
94. Saint-Igny-de-Roche (71428)
95. Saint-Julien-de-Civry (71433)
96. Saint-Julien-de-Jonzy (71434)
97. Saint-Laurent-en-Brionnais (71437)
98. Saint-Léger-lès-Paray (71439)
99. Saint-Martin-de-Lixy (71451)
100. Saint-Martin-du-Lac (71453)
101. Saint-Maurice-lès-Châteauneuf (71463)
102. Saint-Racho (71473)
103. Saint-Romain-sous-Versigny (71478)
104. Saint-Symphorien-des-Bois (71483)
105. Saint-Vincent-Bragny (71490)
106. Saint-Yan (71491)
107. Sarry (71500)
108. Semur-en-Brionnais (71510)
109. Suin (71529)
110. Tancon (71533)
111. Toulon-sur-Arroux (71542)
112. Uxeau (71552)
113. Vareilles (71553)
114. Varenne-Saint-Germain (71557)
115. Varenne-l'Arconce (71554)
116. Varennes-sous-Dun (71559)
117. Vauban (71561)
118. Vaudebarrier (71562)
119. Vendenesse-lès-Charolles (71564)
120. Vendenesse-sur-Arroux (71565)
121. Versaugues (71573)
122. Vindecy (71581)
123. Viry (71586)
124. Vitry-en-Charollais (71588)
125. Vitry-sur-Loire (71589)
126. Volesvres (71590)

== History ==
The arrondissement of Charolles was created in 1800. In January 2017 it gained seven communes from the arrondissement of Autun, and it lost five communes to the arrondissement of Autun, one commune to the arrondissement of Chalon-sur-Saône and 10 communes to the arrondissement of Mâcon.

As a result of the reorganisation of the cantons of France which came into effect in 2015, the borders of the cantons are no longer related to the borders of the arrondissements. The cantons of the arrondissement of Charolles were, as of January 2015:

1. Bourbon-Lancy
2. Charolles
3. Chauffailles
4. La Clayette
5. Digoin
6. Gueugnon
7. La Guiche
8. Marcigny
9. Palinges
10. Paray-le-Monial
11. Saint-Bonnet-de-Joux
12. Semur-en-Brionnais
13. Toulon-sur-Arroux
