= Anglure-sous-Dun =

- Commune
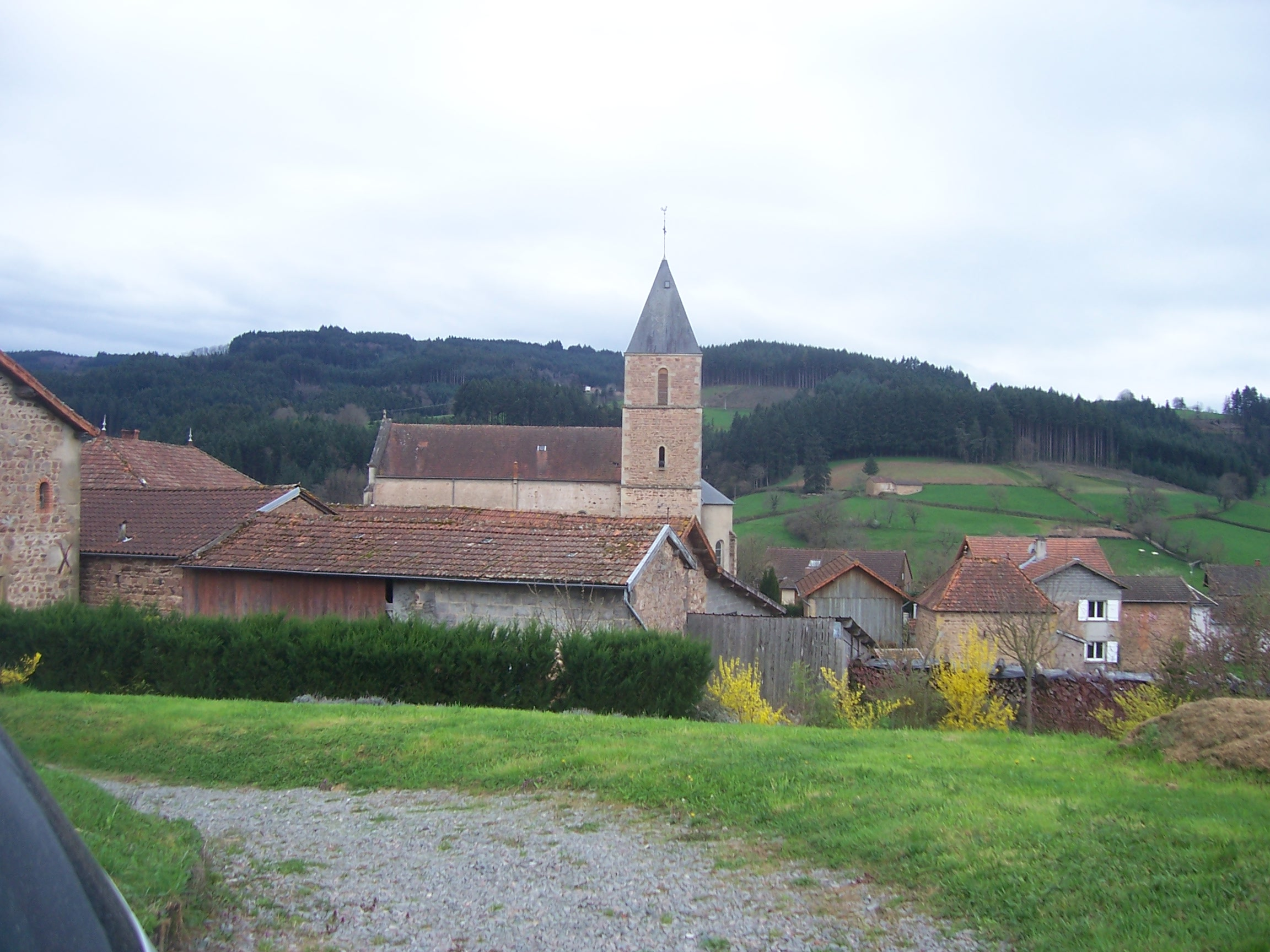
- Location of Anglure-sous-Dun
- Location within France Location within Bourgogne-Franche-Comté
- Coordinates: 46°14′00″N 4°21′40″E
- Country: France
- Region: Bourgogne-Franche-Comté
- Department: Saône-et-Loire
- Arrondissement: Charolles
- Canton: Chauffailles
- Intercommunality: CC Brionnais Sud Bourgogne

Government
  - Mayor (2020–2026): Jean-Claude Vassan
- Area^{1}: 7 km^{2} (2.7 sq mi)
- Elevation: 420 m (1,380 ft)
- Highest elevation: 601 m (1,972 ft)
- Lowest elevation: 373 m (1,224 ft)
- Population (2023): 143
  - Density: 20/km^{2} (53/sq mi)
- Time zone: UTC+01:00 (CET)
  - Summer (DST): UTC+02:00 (CEST)
- INSEE/Postal code: 71008 /71170
- ^{1} French Land Register data, which excludes lakes, ponds, glaciers > 1 km^{2} (0.386 sq mi or 247 acres) and river estuaries.

Anglure-sous-Dun (French pronunciation: [ɑ̃ɡlyʁ su dœ̃]) is a commune in the Saône-et-Loire department in the Bourgogne-Franche-Comté region in eastern France.

== Geography ==
The commune lies in the south of the department near Charolles.

== Population ==
Historical population
Year	Pop.	±% p.a.
1968	217	—
1975	188	−2.03%
1982	154	−2.81%
1990	138	−1.36%
1999	148	+0.78%
2007	168	+1.60%
2012	173	+0.59%
2017	156	−2.05%
2023	143	−1.44%
Source: INSEE

== See also ==
- Communes of the Saône-et-Loire department
