= Grandvaux, Saône-et-Loire =

Grandvaux
- Commune
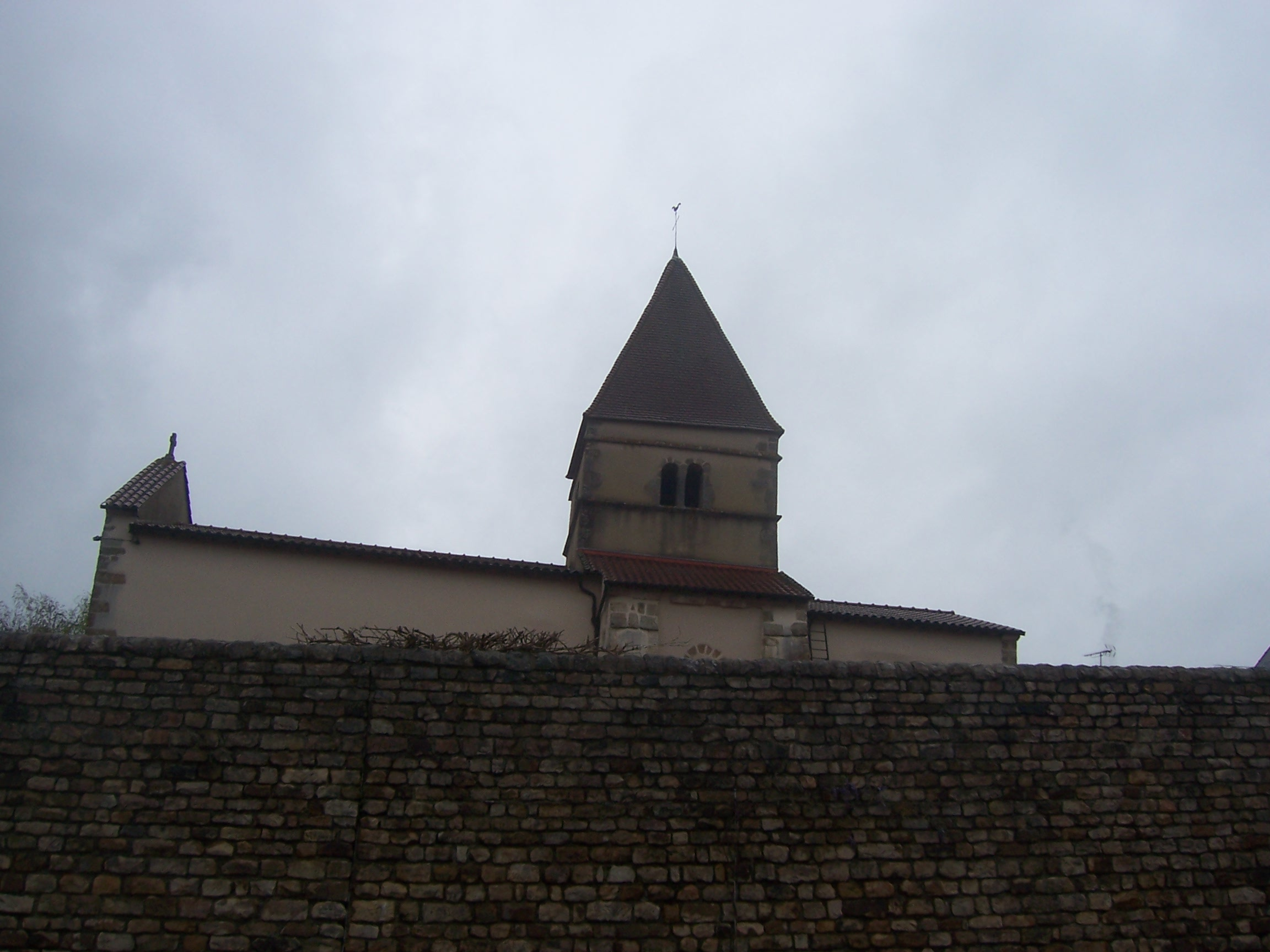
- The church in Grandvaux
- Location of Grandvaux
- Location within France Location within Bourgogne-Franche-Comté
- Coordinates: 46°30′41″N 4°15′51″E
- Country: France
- Region: Bourgogne-Franche-Comté
- Department: Saône-et-Loire
- Arrondissement: Charolles
- Canton: Charolles
- Intercommunality: Le Grand Charolais

Government
  - Mayor (2020–2026): Jean-Yves Bichet
- Area^{1}: 6.18 km^{2} (2.39 sq mi)
- Elevation: 320 m (1,050 ft)
- Highest elevation: 443 m (1,453 ft)
- Lowest elevation: 273 m (896 ft)
- Population (2023): 86
  - Density: 14/km^{2} (36/sq mi)
- Time zone: UTC+01:00 (CET)
  - Summer (DST): UTC+02:00 (CEST)
- INSEE/Postal code: 71224 /71430
- ^{1} French Land Register data, which excludes lakes, ponds, glaciers > 1 km^{2} (0.386 sq mi or 247 acres) and river estuaries.

Grandvaux (French pronunciation: [ɡʁɑ̃vo]) is a commune in the Saône-et-Loire department in the region of Bourgogne-Franche-Comté in eastern France.

== See also ==
- Communes of the Saône-et-Loire department
