= Champlecy =

- Commune
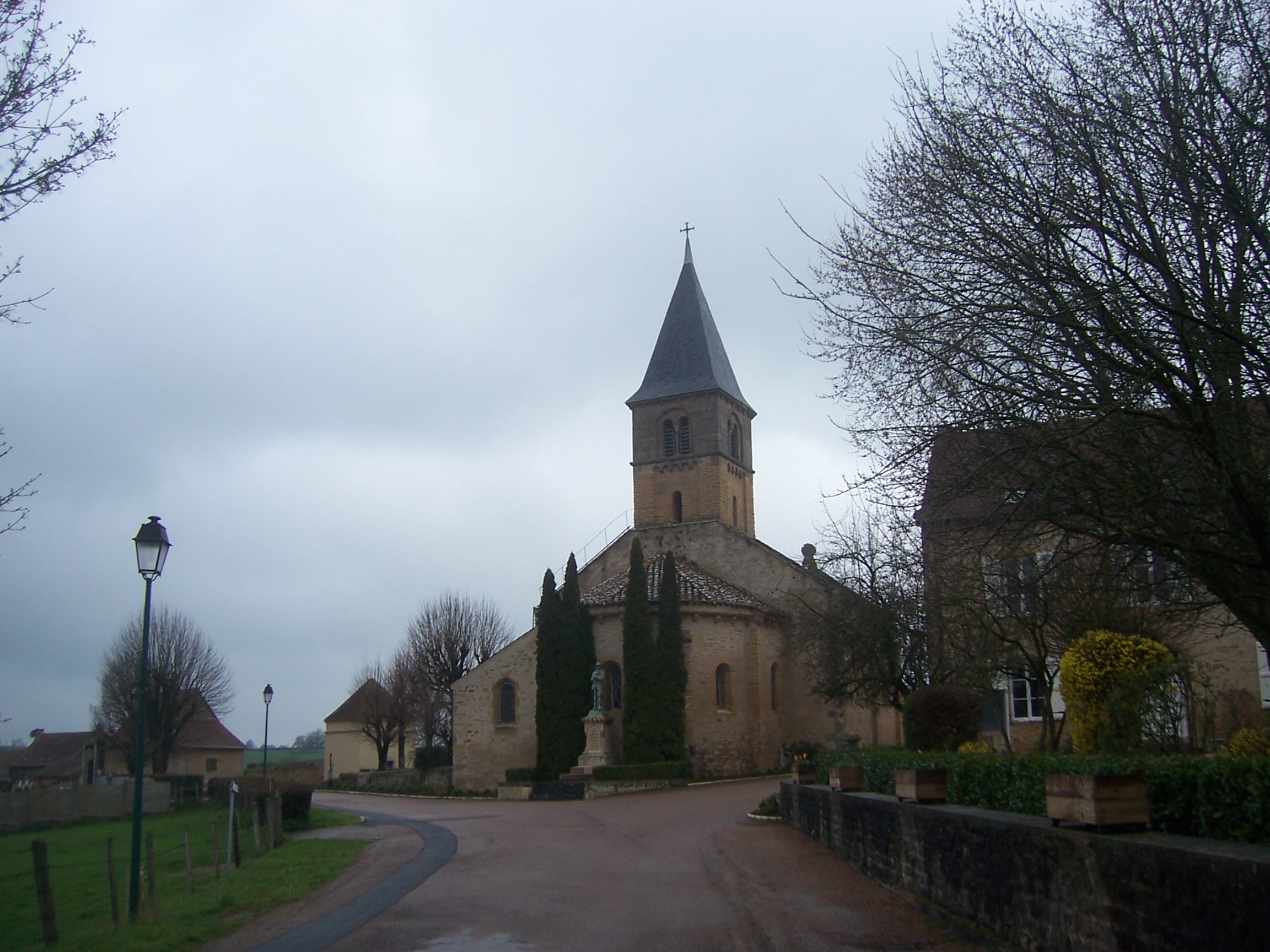
- The church in Champlecy
- Location of Champlecy
- Location within France Location within Bourgogne-Franche-Comté
- Coordinates: 46°28′15″N 4°14′41″E
- Country: France
- Region: Bourgogne-Franche-Comté
- Department: Saône-et-Loire
- Arrondissement: Charolles
- Canton: Charolles
- Area^{1}: 22.82 km^{2} (8.81 sq mi)
- Elevation: 327 m (1,073 ft)
- Highest elevation: 363 m (1,191 ft)
- Lowest elevation: 249 m (817 ft)
- Population (2023): 200
  - Density: 8.8/km^{2} (23/sq mi)
- Time zone: UTC+01:00 (CET)
  - Summer (DST): UTC+02:00 (CEST)
- INSEE/Postal code: 71082 /71120
- ^{1} French Land Register data, which excludes lakes, ponds, glaciers > 1 km^{2} (0.386 sq mi or 247 acres) and river estuaries.

Champlecy is a commune in the Saône-et-Loire department in the region of Bourgogne-Franche-Comté in eastern France.

== See also ==
- Communes of the Saône-et-Loire department
