= Vaudebarrier =

- Commune
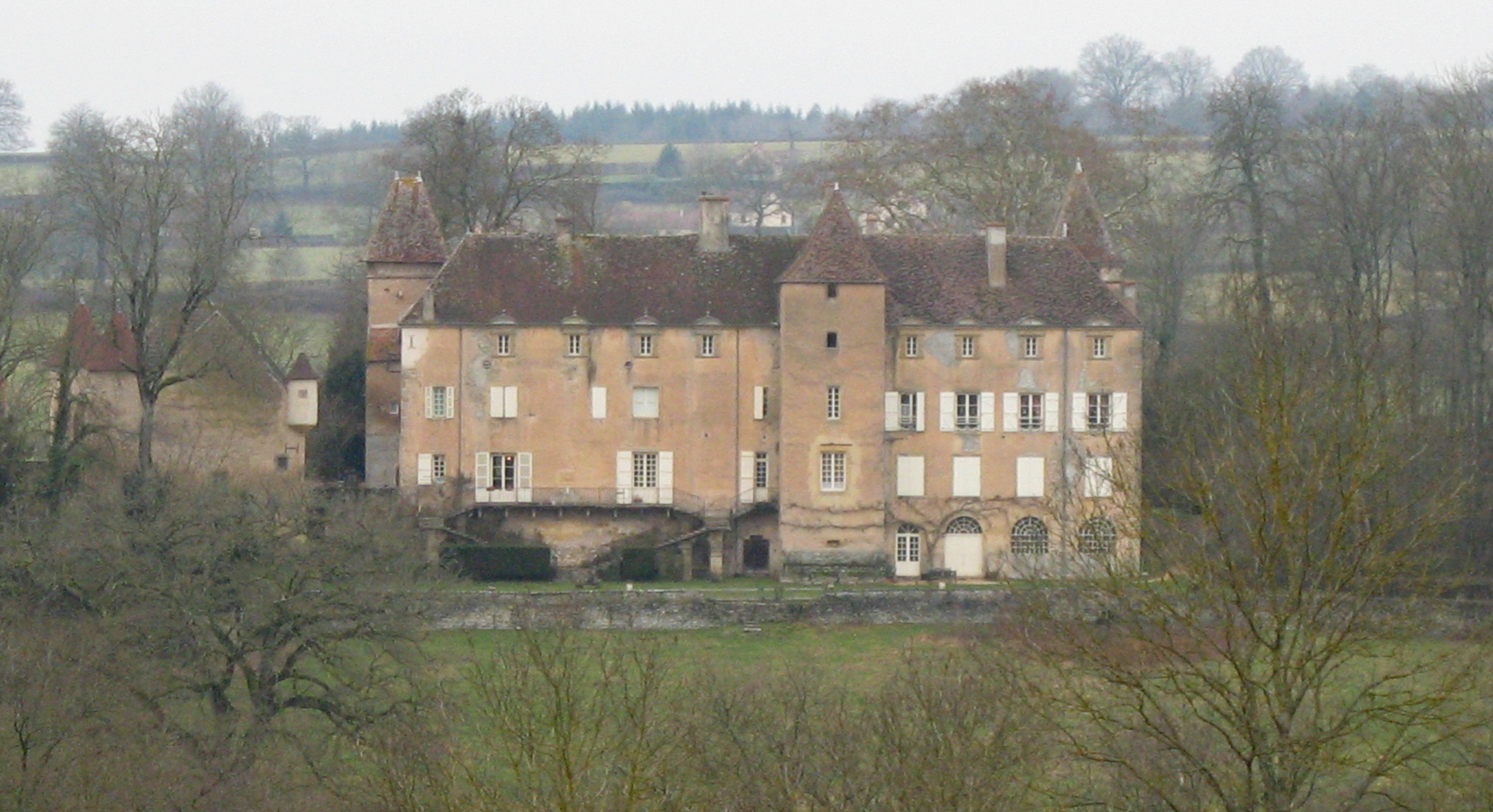
- Chateau of Molleron
- Location of Vaudebarrier
- Location within France Location within Bourgogne-Franche-Comté
- Coordinates: 46°24′51″N 4°18′38″E
- Country: France
- Region: Bourgogne-Franche-Comté
- Department: Saône-et-Loire
- Arrondissement: Charolles
- Canton: Charolles

Government
  - Mayor (2020–2026): Philippe Dumoux
- Area^{1}: 8 km^{2} (3.1 sq mi)
- Elevation: 307 m (1,007 ft)
- Highest elevation: 358 m (1,175 ft)
- Lowest elevation: 282 m (925 ft)
- Population (2023): 211
  - Density: 26/km^{2} (68/sq mi)
- Time zone: UTC+01:00 (CET)
  - Summer (DST): UTC+02:00 (CEST)
- INSEE/Postal code: 71562 /71120
- ^{1} French Land Register data, which excludes lakes, ponds, glaciers > 1 km^{2} (0.386 sq mi or 247 acres) and river estuaries.

Vaudebarrier (French pronunciation: [vodbaʁje]) is a commune in the Saône-et-Loire department in the region of Bourgogne-Franche-Comté in eastern France.

== See also ==
- Communes of the Saône-et-Loire department
