= Prizy =

- Commune
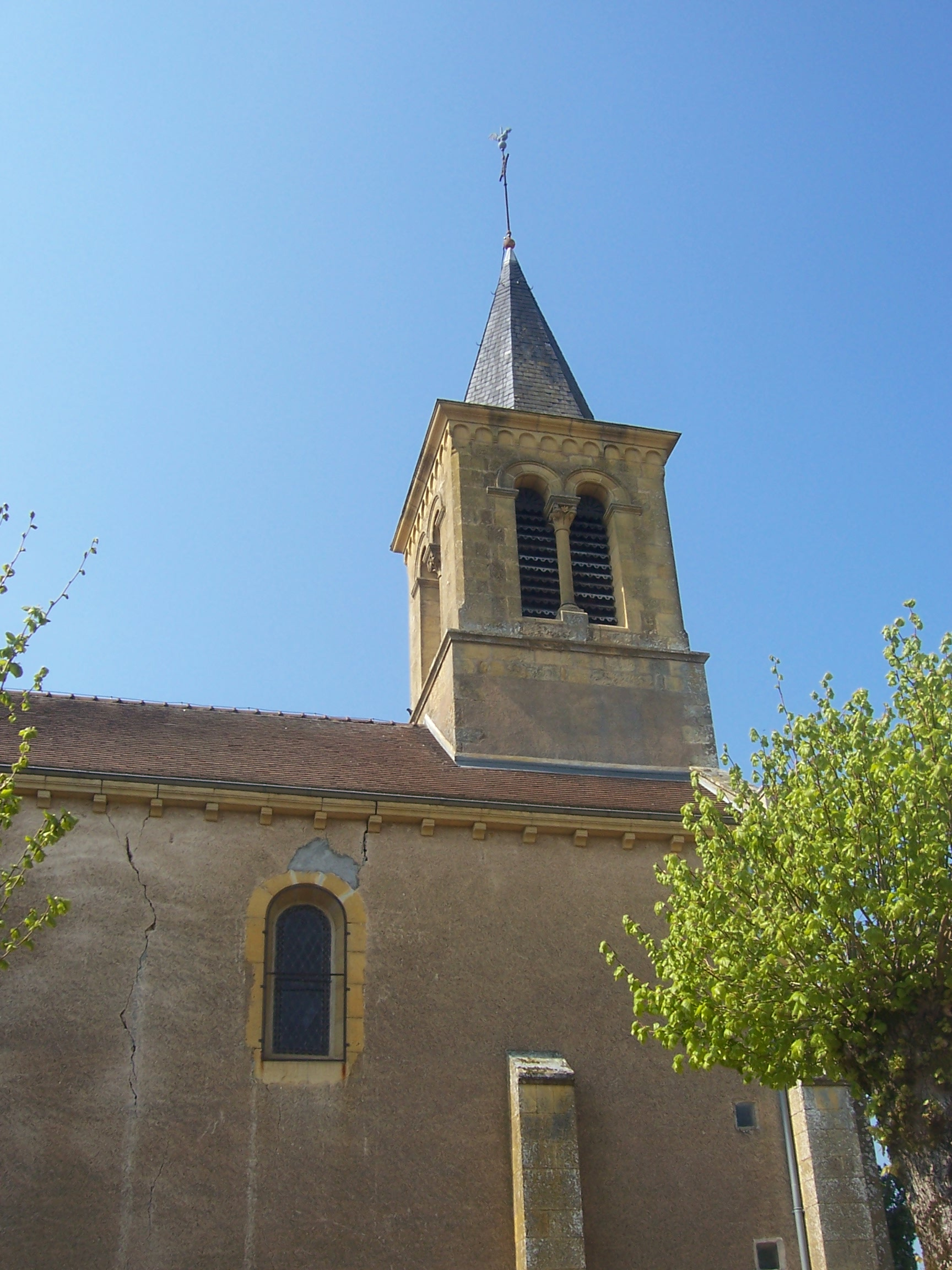
- The church in Prizy
- Location of Prizy
- Location within France Location within Bourgogne-Franche-Comté
- Coordinates: 46°21′25″N 4°13′20″E
- Country: France
- Region: Bourgogne-Franche-Comté
- Department: Saône-et-Loire
- Arrondissement: Charolles
- Canton: Charolles
- Area^{1}: 4.26 km^{2} (1.64 sq mi)
- Elevation: 390 m (1,280 ft)
- Highest elevation: 402 m (1,319 ft)
- Lowest elevation: 281 m (922 ft)
- Population (2023): 56
  - Density: 13/km^{2} (34/sq mi)
- Time zone: UTC+01:00 (CET)
  - Summer (DST): UTC+02:00 (CEST)
- INSEE/Postal code: 71361 /71800
- ^{1} French Land Register data, which excludes lakes, ponds, glaciers > 1 km^{2} (0.386 sq mi or 247 acres) and river estuaries.

Prizy (French pronunciation: [pʁizi]) is a commune in the Saône-et-Loire department in the region of Bourgogne-Franche-Comté in eastern France.

== See also ==
- Communes of the Saône-et-Loire department
