= Saint-Bonnet-de-Vieille-Vigne =

- Commune
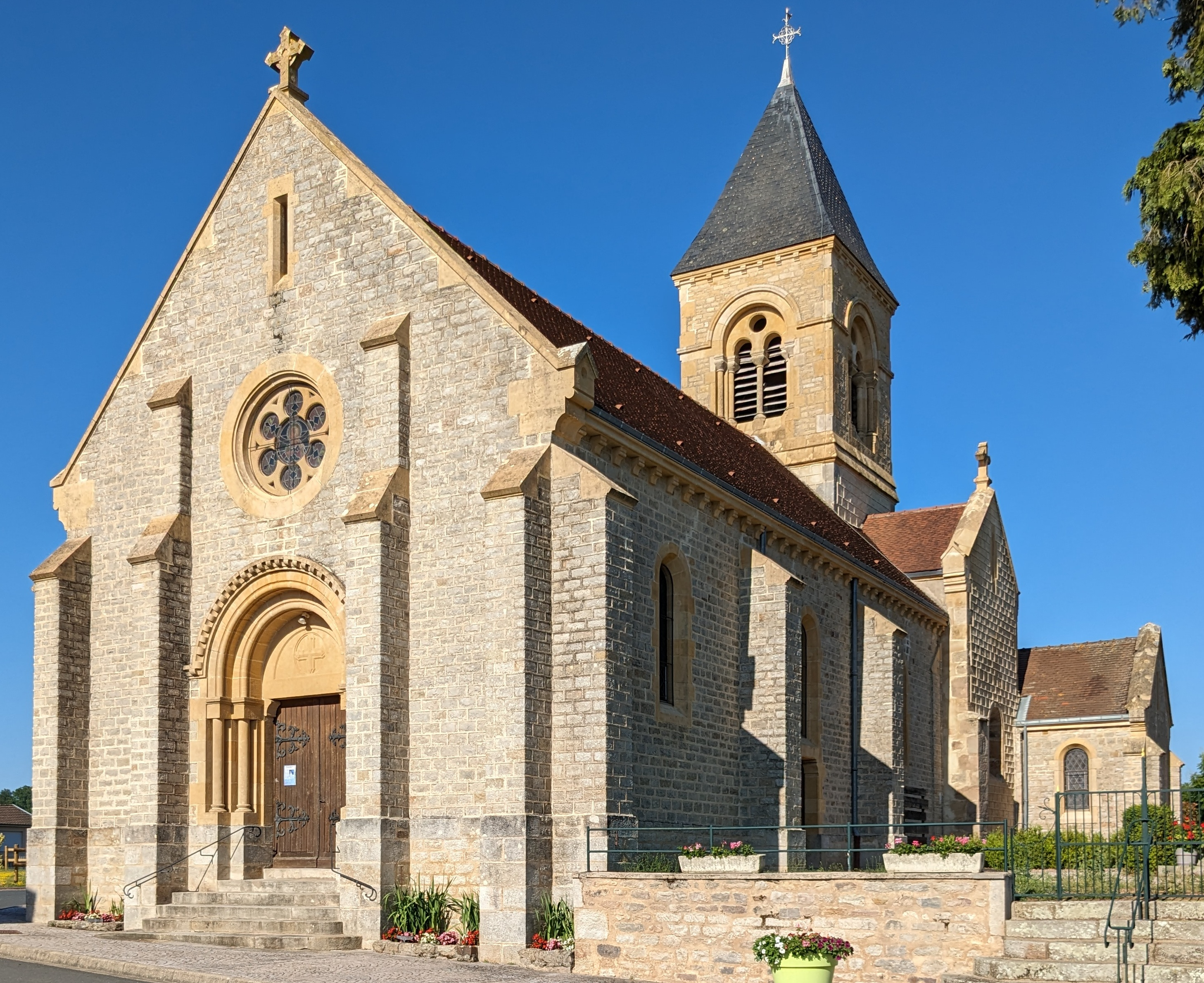
- The church in Saint-Bonnet-de-Vieille-Vigne
- Location of Saint-Bonnet-de-Vieille-Vigne
- Location within France Location within Bourgogne-Franche-Comté
- Coordinates: 46°31′35″N 4°15′32″E
- Country: France
- Region: Bourgogne-Franche-Comté
- Department: Saône-et-Loire
- Arrondissement: Charolles
- Canton: Charolles
- Area^{1}: 17.81 km^{2} (6.88 sq mi)
- Elevation: 310 m (1,020 ft)
- Highest elevation: 447 m (1,467 ft)
- Lowest elevation: 272 m (892 ft)
- Population (2023): 215
  - Density: 12.1/km^{2} (31.3/sq mi)
- Time zone: UTC+01:00 (CET)
  - Summer (DST): UTC+02:00 (CEST)
- INSEE/Postal code: 71395 /71430
- ^{1} French Land Register data, which excludes lakes, ponds, glaciers > 1 km^{2} (0.386 sq mi or 247 acres) and river estuaries.

Saint-Bonnet-de-Vieille-Vigne is a commune in the Saône-et-Loire department in the region of Bourgogne-Franche-Comté in eastern France.

== See also ==
- Communes of the Saône-et-Loire department
