= Marcilly-la-Gueurce =

- Commune
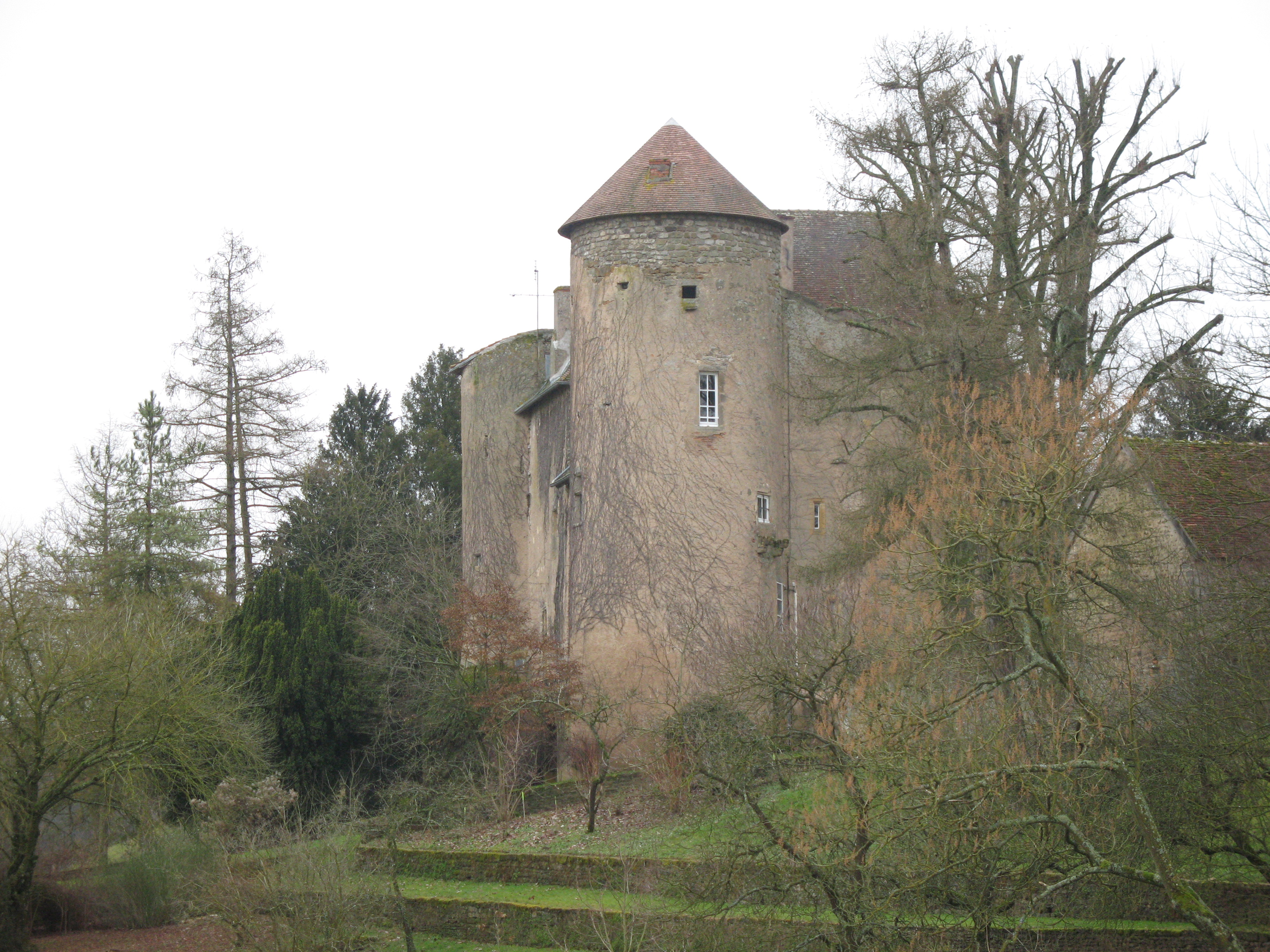
- Chateau
- Location of Marcilly-la-Gueurce
- Location within France Location within Bourgogne-Franche-Comté
- Coordinates: 46°24′06″N 4°18′02″E
- Country: France
- Region: Bourgogne-Franche-Comté
- Department: Saône-et-Loire
- Arrondissement: Charolles
- Canton: Charolles

Government
  - Mayor (2022–2026): Régis Gautheron
- Area^{1}: 11.08 km^{2} (4.28 sq mi)
- Elevation: 320 m (1,050 ft)
- Highest elevation: 419 m (1,375 ft)
- Lowest elevation: 279 m (915 ft)
- Population (2023): 140
  - Density: 13/km^{2} (33/sq mi)
- Time zone: UTC+01:00 (CET)
  - Summer (DST): UTC+02:00 (CEST)
- INSEE/Postal code: 71276 /71120
- ^{1} French Land Register data, which excludes lakes, ponds, glaciers > 1 km^{2} (0.386 sq mi or 247 acres) and river estuaries.

Marcilly-la-Gueurce is a commune in the Saône-et-Loire department in the region of Bourgogne-Franche-Comté in eastern France.

== See also ==
- Communes of the Saône-et-Loire department
