= Ballore =

- Commune
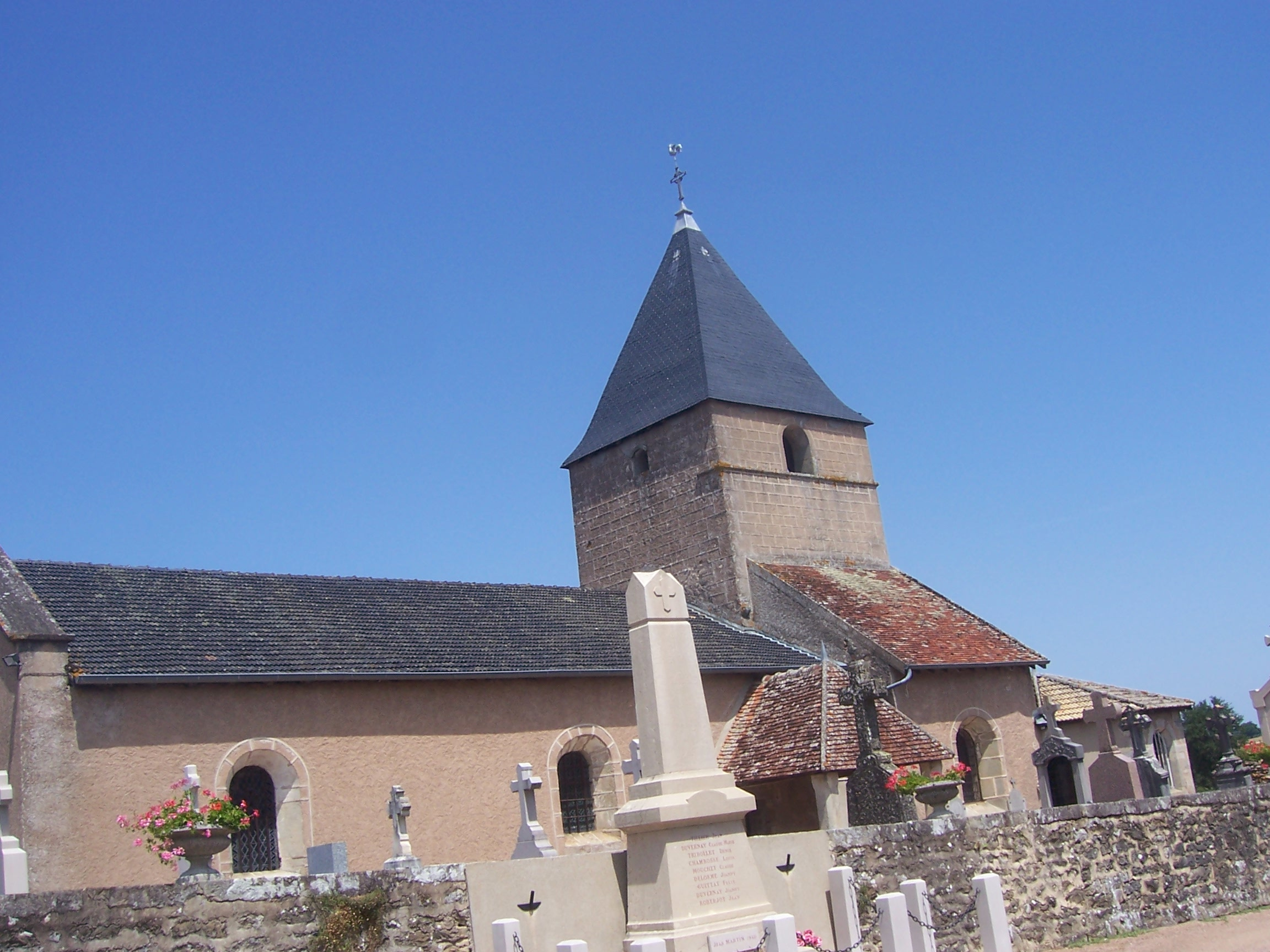
- Location of Ballore
- Location within France Location within Bourgogne-Franche-Comté
- Coordinates: 46°32′09″N 4°22′09″E
- Country: France
- Region: Bourgogne-Franche-Comté
- Department: Saône-et-Loire
- Arrondissement: Charolles
- Canton: Charolles

Government
  - Mayor (2020–2026): Paul Dumontet
- Area^{1}: 10.75 km^{2} (4.15 sq mi)
- Elevation: 319 m (1,047 ft)
- Highest elevation: 391 m (1,283 ft)
- Lowest elevation: 312 m (1,024 ft)
- Population (2023): 87
  - Density: 8.1/km^{2} (21/sq mi)
- Time zone: UTC+01:00 (CET)
  - Summer (DST): UTC+02:00 (CEST)
- INSEE/Postal code: 71017 /71220
- ^{1} French Land Register data, which excludes lakes, ponds, glaciers > 1 km^{2} (0.386 sq mi or 247 acres) and river estuaries.

Ballore (French pronunciation: [balɔʁ]) is a commune in the Saône-et-Loire department in the region of Bourgogne-Franche-Comté in eastern France.

== Geography ==
The commune lies in the southwest of the department in the valley of the Loire.

The Arconce flows southwest through the commune.

== Population ==
Historical population
Year	Pop.	±% p.a.
1968	142	—
1975	127	−1.58%
1982	115	−1.41%
1990	93	−2.62%
1999	84	−1.12%
2007	82	−0.30%
2012	85	+0.72%
2017	92	+1.60%
2023	87	−0.93%
Source: INSEE

== See also ==
- Communes of the Saône-et-Loire department
