= Saint-Germain-en-Brionnais =

- Commune
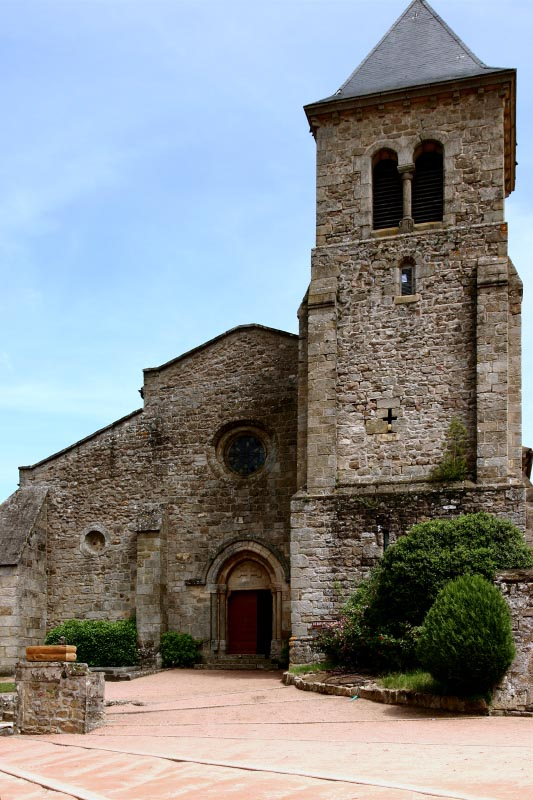
- The church in Saint-Germain-en-Brionnais
- Location of Saint-Germain-en-Brionnais
- Location within France Location within Bourgogne-Franche-Comté
- Coordinates: 46°20′59″N 4°15′24″E
- Country: France
- Region: Bourgogne-Franche-Comté
- Department: Saône-et-Loire
- Arrondissement: Charolles
- Canton: Charolles

Government
  - Mayor (2020–2026): Dominique Vaizand
- Area^{1}: 5.96 km^{2} (2.30 sq mi)
- Elevation: 418 m (1,371 ft)
- Highest elevation: 456 m (1,496 ft)
- Lowest elevation: 307 m (1,007 ft)
- Population (2023): 172
  - Density: 28.9/km^{2} (74.7/sq mi)
- Time zone: UTC+01:00 (CET)
  - Summer (DST): UTC+02:00 (CEST)
- INSEE/Postal code: 71421 /71800
- ^{1} French Land Register data, which excludes lakes, ponds, glaciers > 1 km^{2} (0.386 sq mi or 247 acres) and river estuaries.

Saint-Germain-en-Brionnais (French pronunciation: [sɛ̃ ʒɛʁmɛ̃ ɑ̃ bʁijɔnɛ]) is a commune in the Saône-et-Loire department in the region of Bourgogne-Franche-Comté in eastern France.

== See also ==
- Communes of the Saône-et-Loire department
