= Changy, Saône-et-Loire =

Changy
- Commune
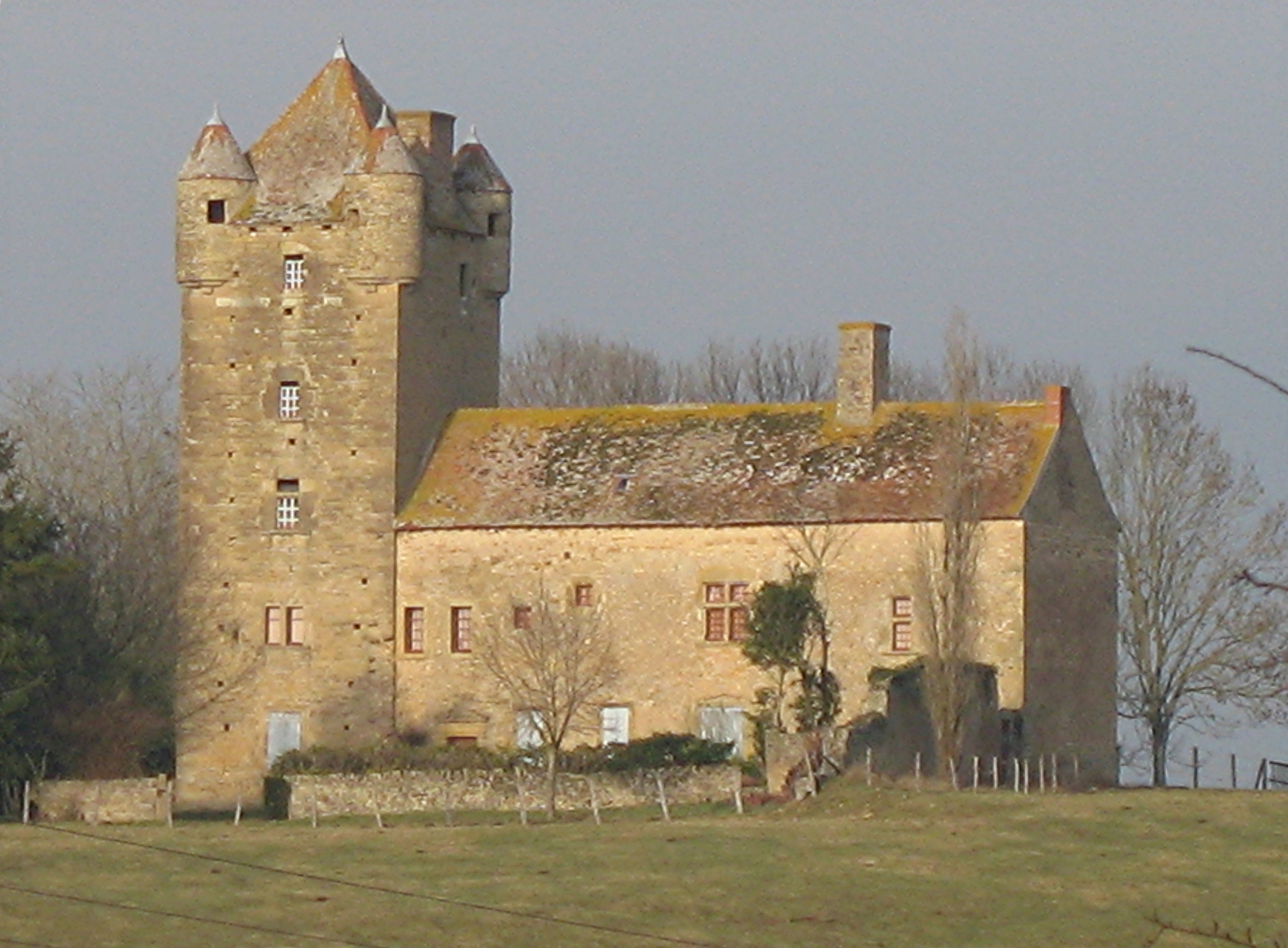
- Chateau of Montessus
- Location of Changy
- Location within France Location within Bourgogne-Franche-Comté
- Coordinates: 46°24′57″N 4°14′17″E
- Country: France
- Region: Bourgogne-Franche-Comté
- Department: Saône-et-Loire
- Arrondissement: Charolles
- Canton: Charolles

Government
  - Mayor (2020–2026): Daniel Beraud
- Area^{1}: 20.12 km^{2} (7.77 sq mi)
- Elevation: 350 m (1,150 ft)
- Highest elevation: 386 m (1,266 ft)
- Lowest elevation: 269 m (883 ft)
- Population (2023): 427
  - Density: 21.2/km^{2} (55.0/sq mi)
- Time zone: UTC+01:00 (CET)
  - Summer (DST): UTC+02:00 (CEST)
- INSEE/Postal code: 71086 /71120
- ^{1} French Land Register data, which excludes lakes, ponds, glaciers > 1 km^{2} (0.386 sq mi or 247 acres) and river estuaries.

Changy (French pronunciation: [ʃɑ̃ʒi]) is a commune in the Saône-et-Loire department in the region of Bourgogne-Franche-Comté in eastern France.

== Geography ==
The Arconce flows southwestward through the middle of the commune.

== See also ==
- Communes of the Saône-et-Loire department
