= Ozolles =

- Commune
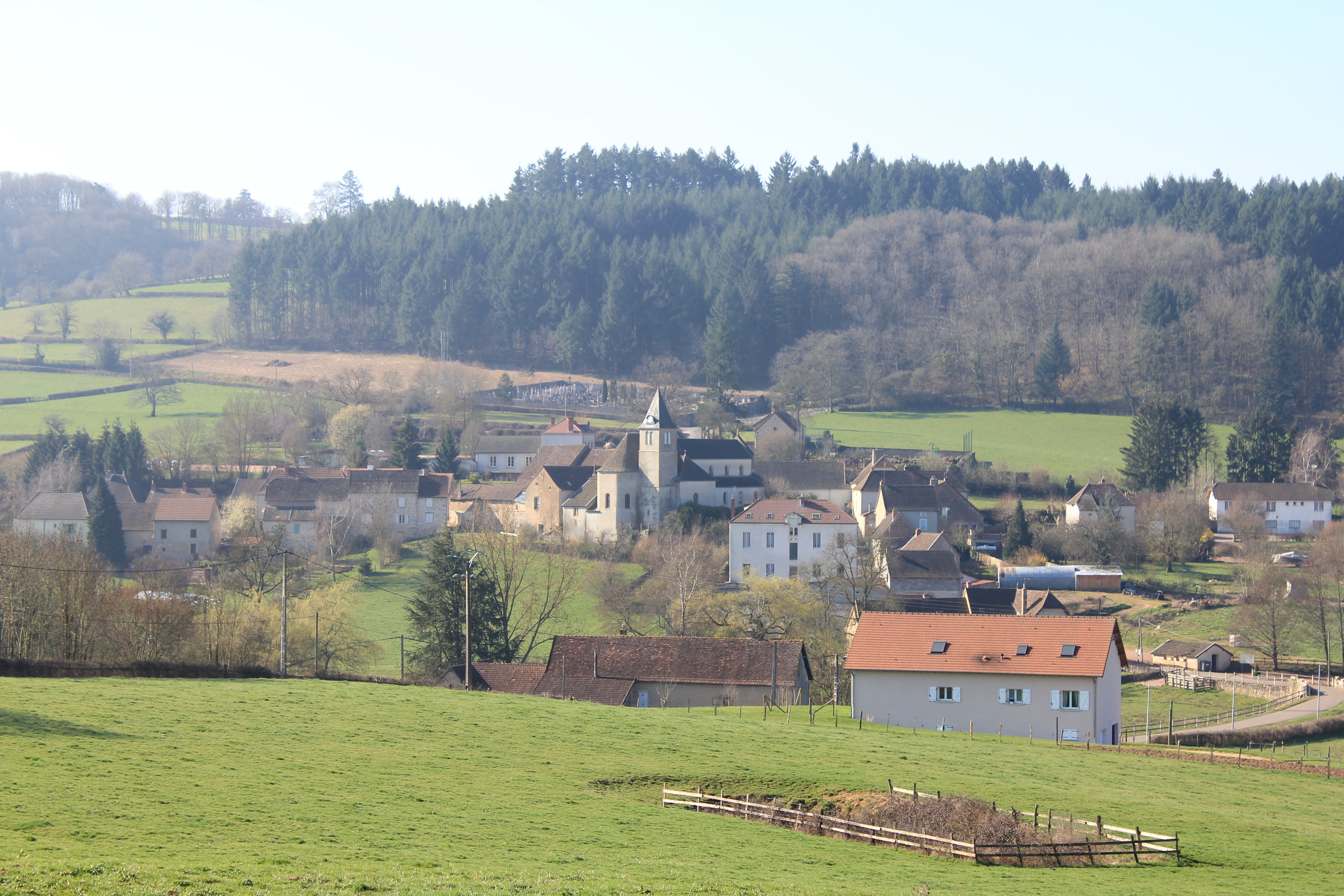
- A general view of Ozolles
- Location of Ozolles
- Location within France Location within Bourgogne-Franche-Comté
- Coordinates: 46°22′59″N 4°21′04″E
- Country: France
- Region: Bourgogne-Franche-Comté
- Department: Saône-et-Loire
- Arrondissement: Charolles
- Canton: Charolles

Government
  - Mayor (2020–2026): Gérard Lallement
- Area^{1}: 27.2 km^{2} (10.5 sq mi)
- Elevation: 405 m (1,329 ft)
- Highest elevation: 515 m (1,690 ft)
- Lowest elevation: 309 m (1,014 ft)
- Population (2023): 371
  - Density: 13.6/km^{2} (35.3/sq mi)
- Time zone: UTC+01:00 (CET)
  - Summer (DST): UTC+02:00 (CEST)
- INSEE/Postal code: 71339 /71120
- ^{1} French Land Register data, which excludes lakes, ponds, glaciers > 1 km^{2} (0.386 sq mi or 247 acres) and river estuaries.

Ozolles (French pronunciation: [ozɔl]) is a commune in the Saône-et-Loire department in the region of Bourgogne-France-Comté in eastern France.

== See also ==
- Communes of the Saône-et-Loire department
