= Suin, Saône-et-Loire =

Suin
- Commune
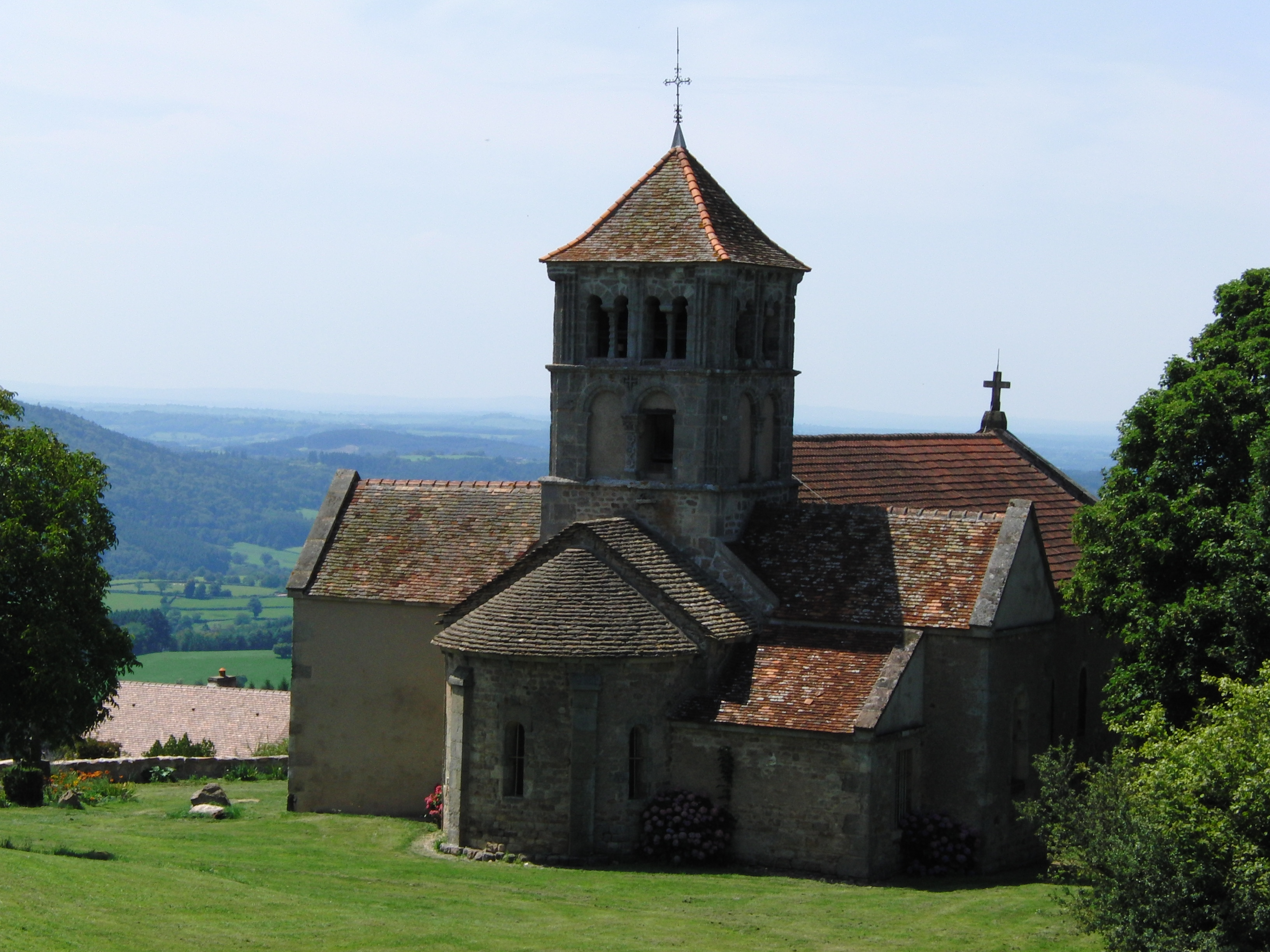
- The church in Suin
- Location of Suin
- Location within France Location within Bourgogne-Franche-Comté
- Coordinates: 46°26′03″N 4°28′15″E
- Country: France
- Region: Bourgogne-Franche-Comté
- Department: Saône-et-Loire
- Arrondissement: Charolles
- Canton: Charolles

Government
  - Mayor (2020–2026): Jean-Claude Michel
- Area^{1}: 21.98 km^{2} (8.49 sq mi)
- Elevation: 593 m (1,946 ft)
- Highest elevation: 600 m (2,000 ft)
- Lowest elevation: 310 m (1,020 ft)
- Population (2023): 273
  - Density: 12.4/km^{2} (32.2/sq mi)
- Time zone: UTC+01:00 (CET)
  - Summer (DST): UTC+02:00 (CEST)
- INSEE/Postal code: 71529 /71220
- ^{1} French Land Register data, which excludes lakes, ponds, glaciers > 1 km^{2} (0.386 sq mi or 247 acres) and river estuaries.

Suin (French pronunciation: [sɥɛ̃]) is a commune in the Saône-et-Loire department in the region of Bourgogne-Franche-Comté in eastern France. The name is derived from Gaulish Segodunum.

== See also ==
- Communes of the Saône-et-Loire department
