= Colombier-en-Brionnais =

- Commune
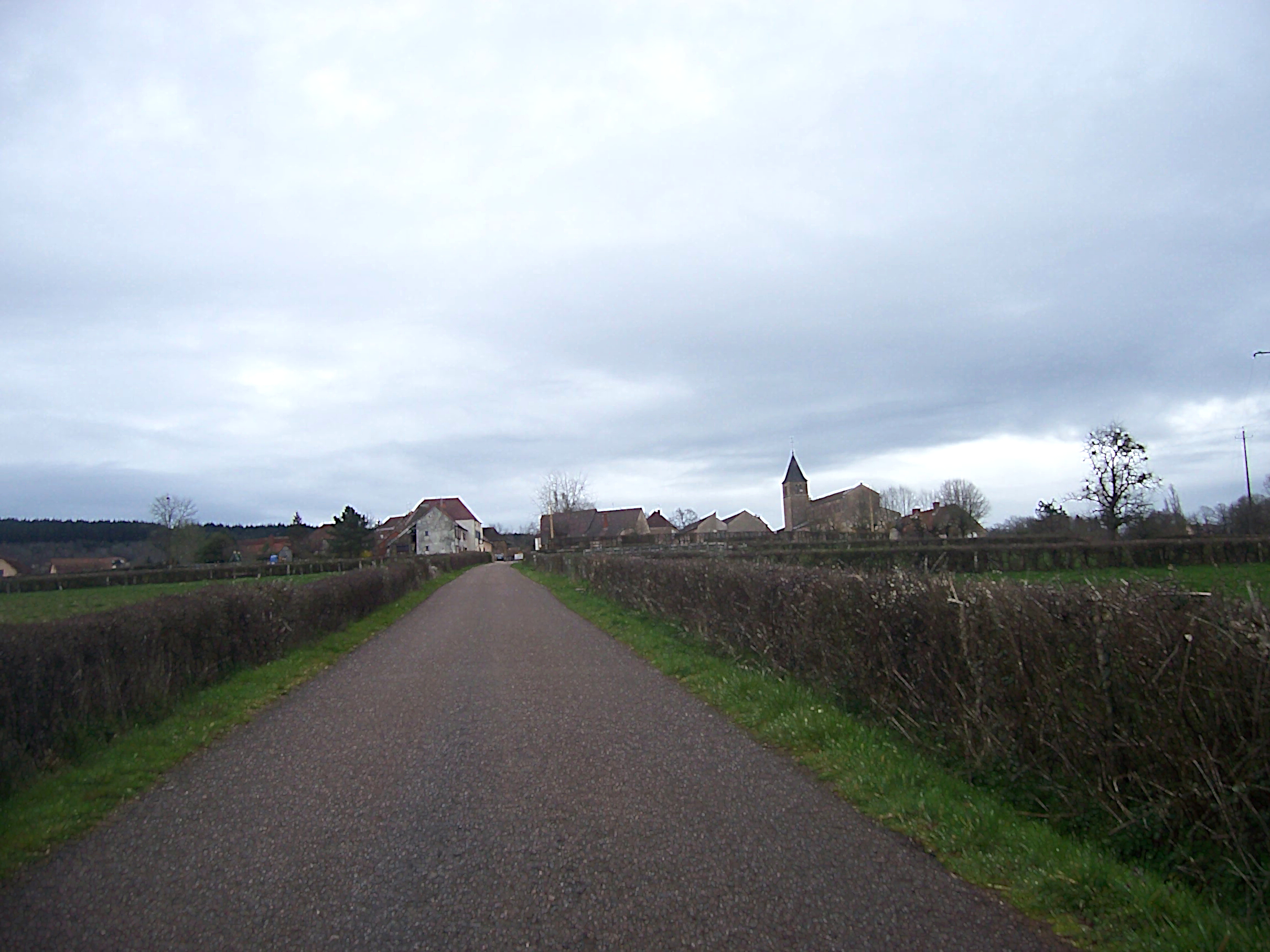
- A general view of Colombier-en-Brionnais
- Location of Colombier-en-Brionnais
- Location within France Location within Bourgogne-Franche-Comté
- Coordinates: 46°21′25″N 4°20′05″E
- Country: France
- Region: Bourgogne-Franche-Comté
- Department: Saône-et-Loire
- Arrondissement: Charolles
- Canton: Charolles

Government
  - Mayor (2020–2026): Jean-Paul Malatier
- Area^{1}: 13.37 km^{2} (5.16 sq mi)
- Elevation: 385 m (1,263 ft)
- Highest elevation: 519 m (1,703 ft)
- Lowest elevation: 333 m (1,093 ft)
- Population (2023): 314
  - Density: 23.5/km^{2} (60.8/sq mi)
- Time zone: UTC+01:00 (CET)
  - Summer (DST): UTC+02:00 (CEST)
- INSEE/Postal code: 71141 /71800
- ^{1} French Land Register data, which excludes lakes, ponds, glaciers > 1 km^{2} (0.386 sq mi or 247 acres) and river estuaries.

Colombier-en-Brionnais (French pronunciation: [kɔlɔ̃bje ɑ̃ bʁijɔnɛ]) is a commune in the Saône-et-Loire department in the region of Bourgogne-Franche-Comté in eastern France.

== See also ==
- Communes of the Saône-et-Loire department
