= Saint-Julien-de-Civry =

- Commune
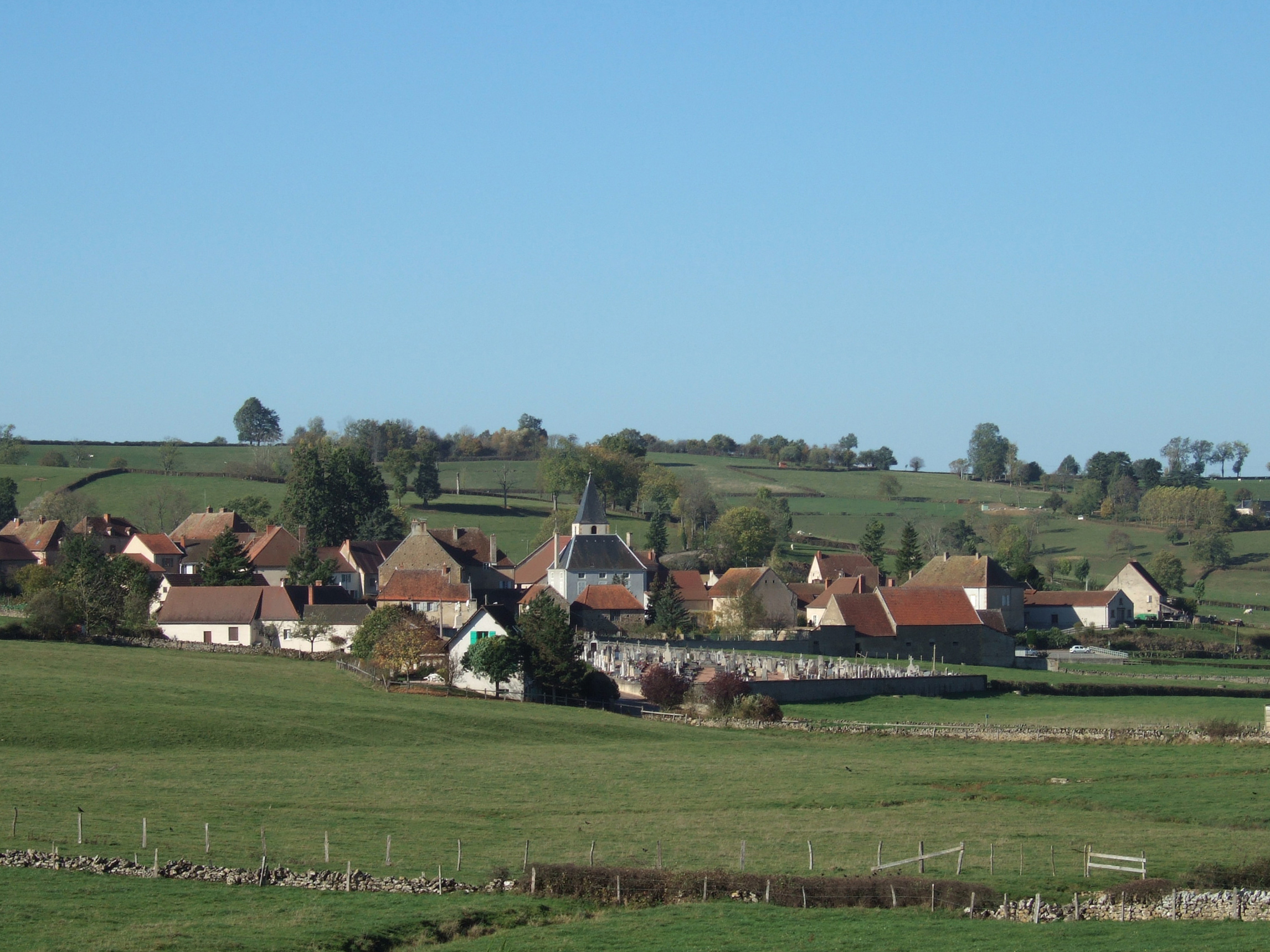
- A general view of Saint-Julien-de-Civry
- Location of Saint-Julien-de-Civry
- Location within France Location within Bourgogne-Franche-Comté
- Coordinates: 46°21′59″N 4°14′01″E
- Country: France
- Region: Bourgogne-Franche-Comté
- Department: Saône-et-Loire
- Arrondissement: Charolles
- Canton: Charolles

Government
  - Mayor (2020–2026): Didier Roux
- Area^{1}: 21.01 km^{2} (8.11 sq mi)
- Elevation: 300 m (980 ft)
- Highest elevation: 406 m (1,332 ft)
- Lowest elevation: 264 m (866 ft)
- Population (2023): 457
  - Density: 21.8/km^{2} (56.3/sq mi)
- Time zone: UTC+01:00 (CET)
  - Summer (DST): UTC+02:00 (CEST)
- INSEE/Postal code: 71433 /71800
- ^{1} French Land Register data, which excludes lakes, ponds, glaciers > 1 km^{2} (0.386 sq mi or 247 acres) and river estuaries.

Saint-Julien-de-Civry (French pronunciation: [sɛ̃ ʒyljɛ̃ də sivʁi]) is a commune in the Saône-et-Loire department in the region of Bourgogne-Franche-Comté in eastern France.

== Geography ==
The Arconce forms part of the commune's northwestern border. The village lies on the left bank of the Lucenay, a tributary of the Arconce.

== Population ==
Historical population
Year	Pop.	±% p.a.
1968	630	—
1975	550	−1.92%
1982	515	−0.93%
1990	526	+0.26%
1999	550	+0.50%
2007	514	−0.84%
2012	505	−0.35%
2017	487	−0.72%
2023	457	−1.05%
Source: INSEE

== See also ==
- Communes of the Saône-et-Loire department
