= Martigny-le-Comte =

- Commune
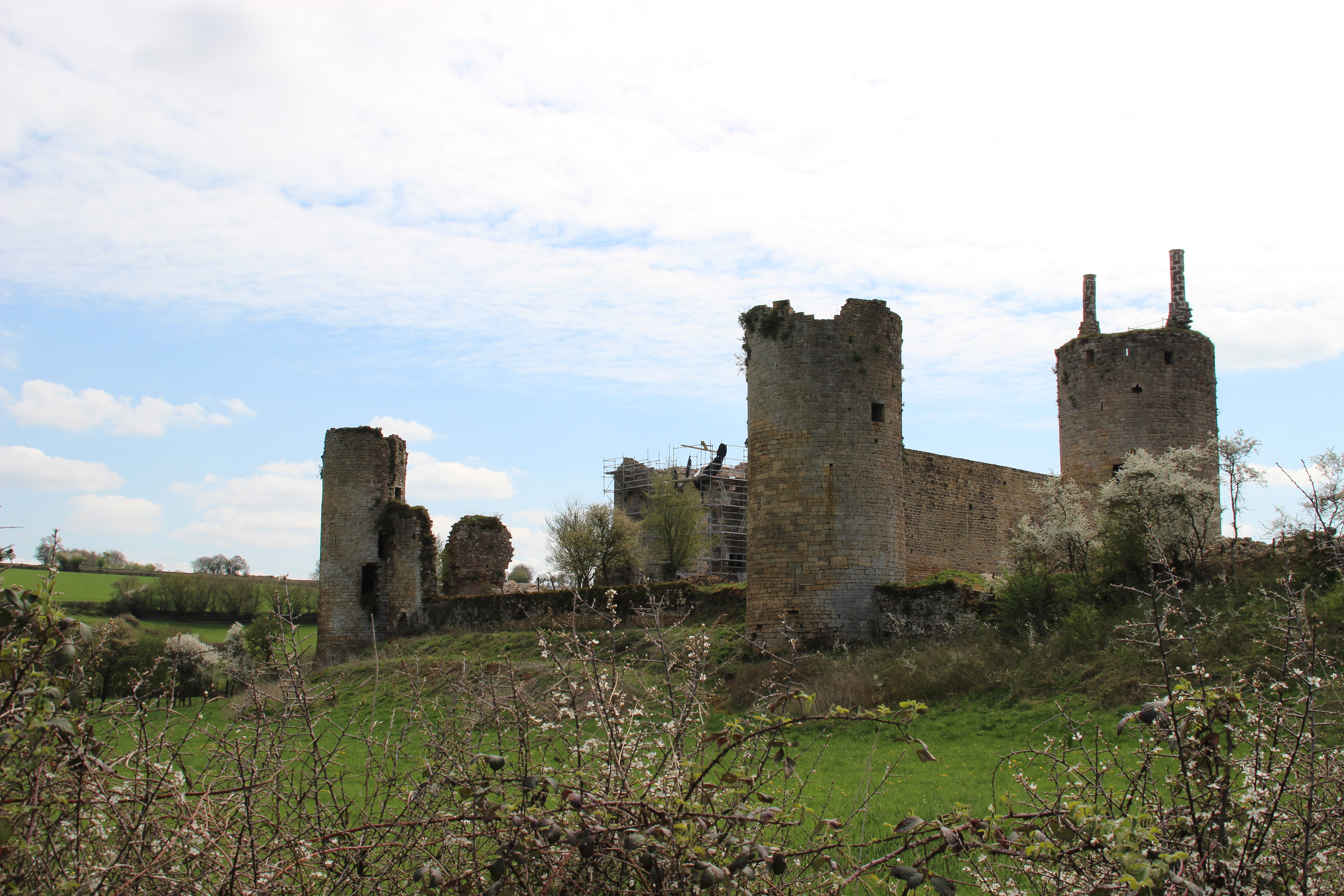
- Ruined château
- Location of Martigny-le-Comte
- Location within France Location within Bourgogne-Franche-Comté
- Coordinates: 46°31′47″N 4°20′02″E
- Country: France
- Region: Bourgogne-Franche-Comté
- Department: Saône-et-Loire
- Arrondissement: Charolles
- Canton: Charolles
- Intercommunality: CC Le Grand Charolais

Government
  - Mayor (2020–2026): Anne Degrange
- Area^{1}: 37.27 km^{2} (14.39 sq mi)
- Elevation: 363 m (1,191 ft)
- Highest elevation: 452 m (1,483 ft)
- Lowest elevation: 294 m (965 ft)
- Population (2023): 406
  - Density: 10.9/km^{2} (28.2/sq mi)
- Time zone: UTC+01:00 (CET)
  - Summer (DST): UTC+02:00 (CEST)
- INSEE/Postal code: 71285 /71220
- Website: martigny-le-comte.fr
- ^{1} French Land Register data, which excludes lakes, ponds, glaciers > 1 km^{2} (0.386 sq mi or 247 acres) and river estuaries.

Martigny-le-Comte (French pronunciation: [maʁtiɲi l(ə) kɔ̃t]; lit. 'Martigny-the-Count') is a rural commune in the Saône-et-Loire department in the Bourgogne-Franche-Comté region in central-east France.

== Geography ==
The Arconce forms the commune's southeastern border.

== See also ==
- Communes of the Saône-et-Loire department
