= Saint-Aubin-en-Charollais =

- Commune
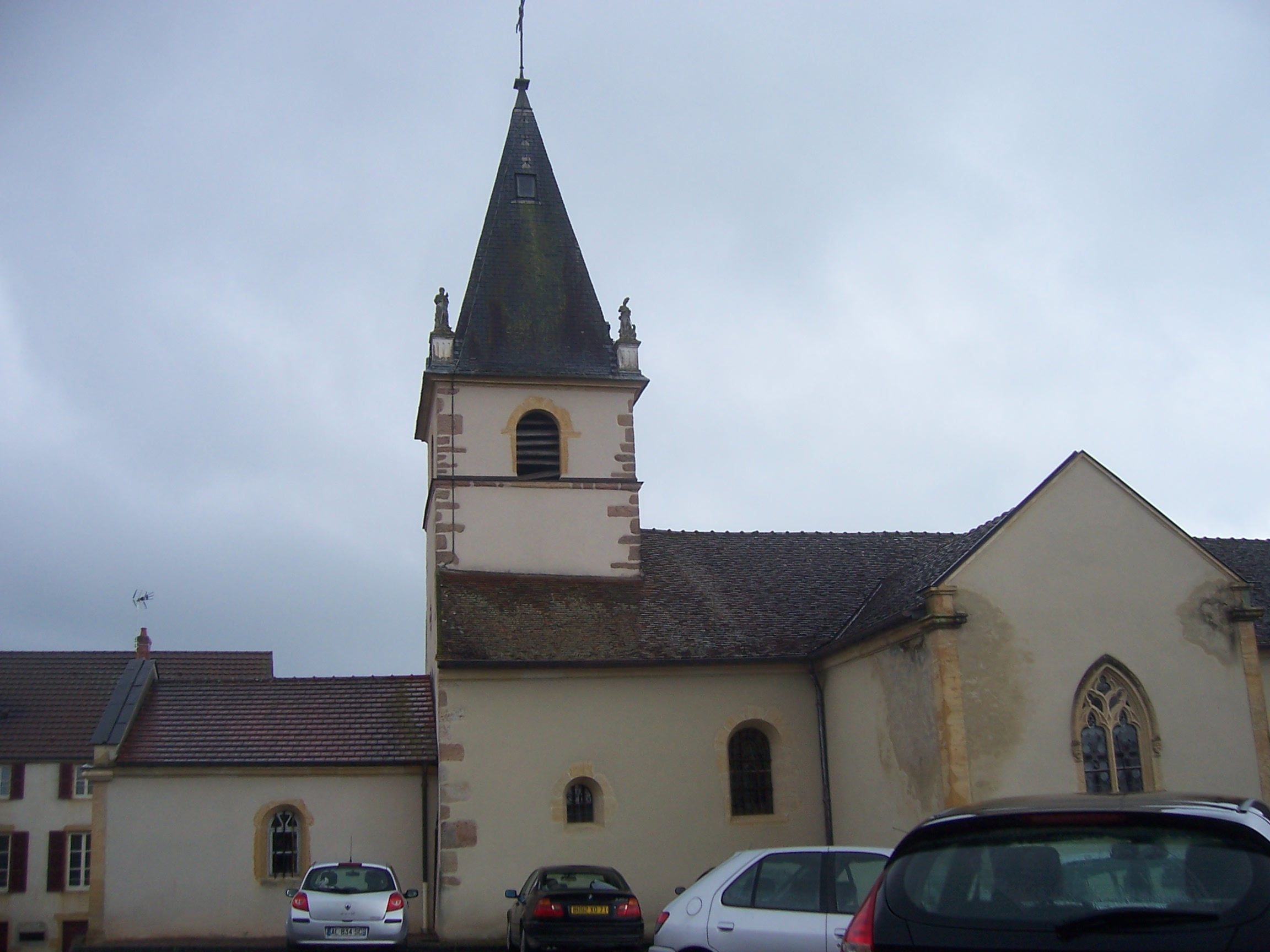
- The church in Saint-Aubin-en-Charollais
- Location of Saint-Aubin-en-Charollais
- Location within France Location within Bourgogne-Franche-Comté
- Coordinates: 46°29′47″N 4°13′01″E
- Country: France
- Region: Bourgogne-Franche-Comté
- Department: Saône-et-Loire
- Arrondissement: Charolles
- Canton: Charolles
- Area^{1}: 19.61 km^{2} (7.57 sq mi)
- Elevation: 270 m (890 ft)
- Highest elevation: 312 m (1,024 ft)
- Lowest elevation: 248 m (814 ft)
- Population (2023): 505
  - Density: 25.8/km^{2} (66.7/sq mi)
- Time zone: UTC+01:00 (CET)
  - Summer (DST): UTC+02:00 (CEST)
- INSEE/Postal code: 71388 /71430
- ^{1} French Land Register data, which excludes lakes, ponds, glaciers > 1 km^{2} (0.386 sq mi or 247 acres) and river estuaries.

Saint-Aubin-en-Charollais is a commune in the Saône-et-Loire department in the region of Bourgogne-Franche-Comté in eastern France.

== Geography ==
The Bourbince forms most of the commune's western border.

== See also ==
- Communes of the Saône-et-Loire department
