= Fontenay, Saône-et-Loire =

Fontenay
- Commune
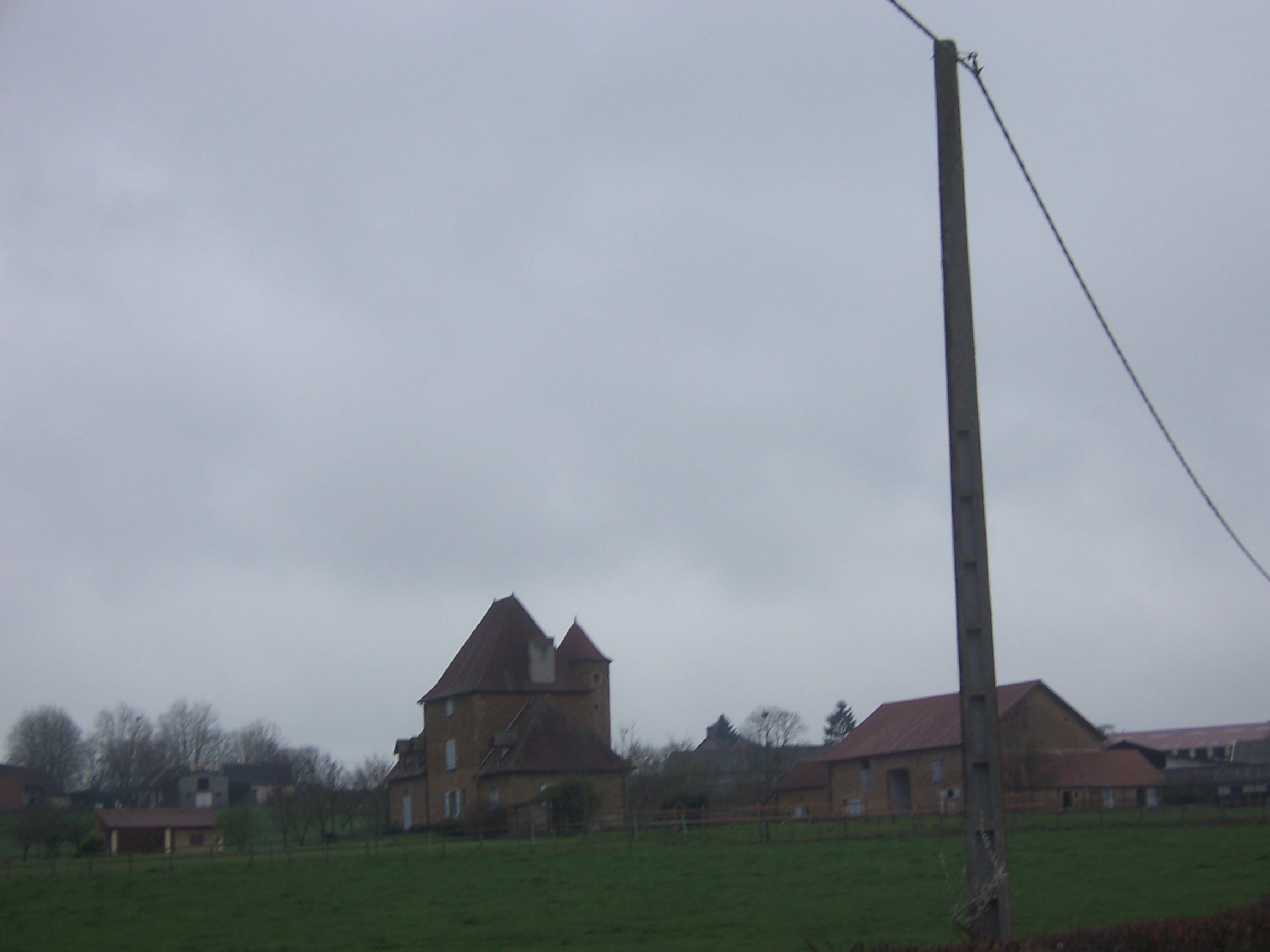
- A general view of Fontenay
- Location of Fontenay
- Location within France Location within Bourgogne-Franche-Comté
- Coordinates: 46°28′34″N 4°17′56″E
- Country: France
- Region: Bourgogne-Franche-Comté
- Department: Saône-et-Loire
- Arrondissement: Charolles
- Canton: Charolles
- Intercommunality: Le Grand Charolais

Government
  - Mayor (2020–2026): Hubert Burtin
- Area^{1}: 2.46 km^{2} (0.95 sq mi)
- Elevation: 350 m (1,150 ft)
- Highest elevation: 361 m (1,184 ft)
- Lowest elevation: 289 m (948 ft)
- Population (2023): 58
  - Density: 24/km^{2} (61/sq mi)
- Time zone: UTC+01:00 (CET)
  - Summer (DST): UTC+02:00 (CEST)
- INSEE/Postal code: 71203 /71120
- ^{1} French Land Register data, which excludes lakes, ponds, glaciers > 1 km^{2} (0.386 sq mi or 247 acres) and river estuaries.

Fontenay (French pronunciation: [fɔ̃tnɛ]) is a commune in the Saône-et-Loire department in the region of Bourgogne-Franche-Comté in eastern France.

== See also ==
- Communes of the Saône-et-Loire department
