= Saint-Vincent-Bragny =

- Commune
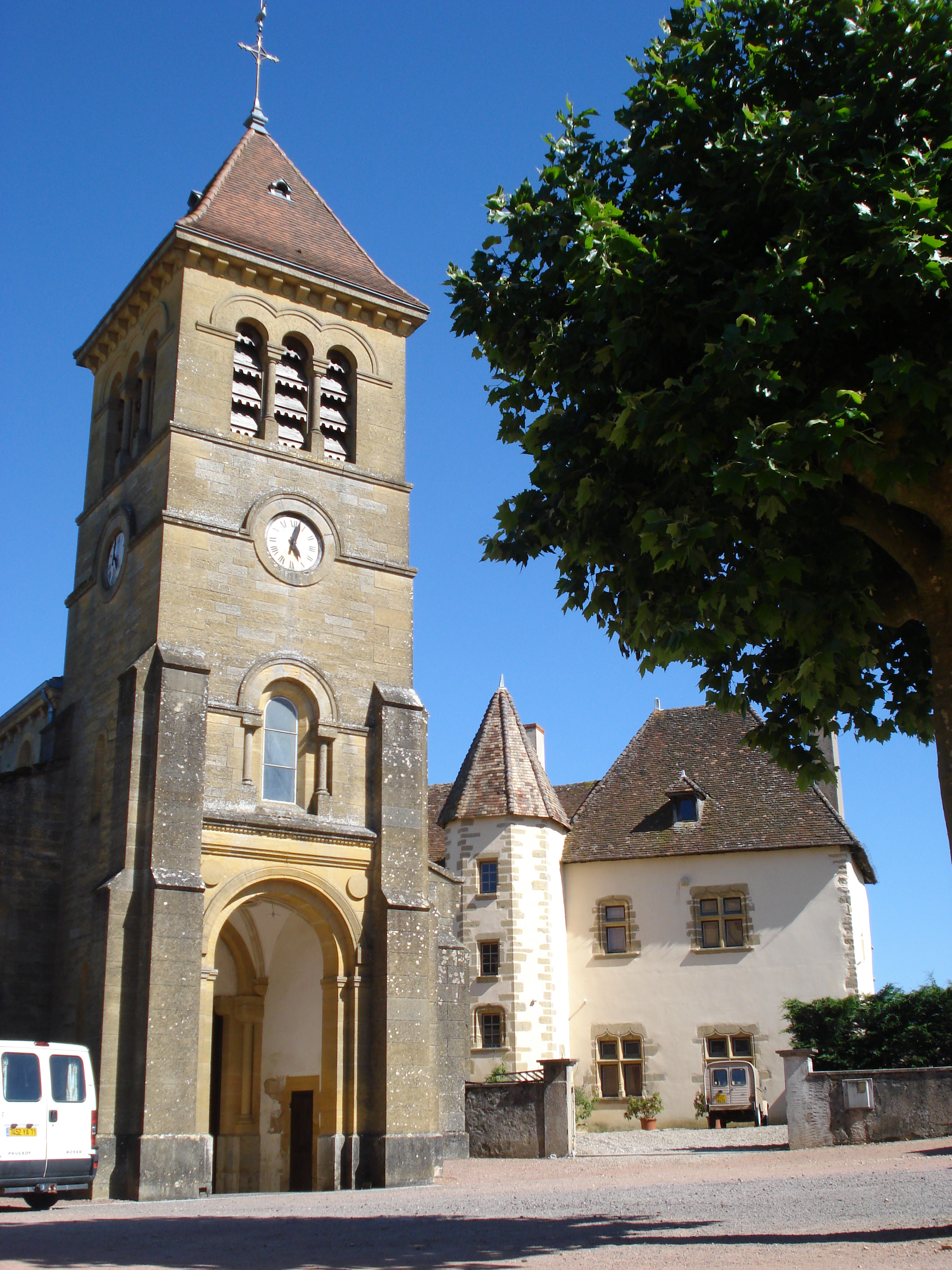
- The church in Bragny
- Location of Saint-Vincent-Bragny
- Location within France Location within Bourgogne-Franche-Comté
- Coordinates: 46°32′06″N 4°07′33″E
- Country: France
- Region: Bourgogne-Franche-Comté
- Department: Saône-et-Loire
- Arrondissement: Charolles
- Canton: Charolles
- Area^{1}: 41 km^{2} (16 sq mi)
- Elevation: 260 m (850 ft)
- Highest elevation: 332 m (1,089 ft)
- Lowest elevation: 241 m (791 ft)
- Population (2023): 989
  - Density: 24/km^{2} (62/sq mi)
- Time zone: UTC+01:00 (CET)
  - Summer (DST): UTC+02:00 (CEST)
- INSEE/Postal code: 71490 /71430
- ^{1} French Land Register data, which excludes lakes, ponds, glaciers > 1 km^{2} (0.386 sq mi or 247 acres) and river estuaries.

Saint-Vincent-Bragny (French pronunciation: [sɛ̃ vɛ̃sɑ̃ bʁaɲi]) is a commune in the Saône-et-Loire department in the region of Bourgogne-Franche-Comté in eastern France.

== See also ==
- Communes of the Saône-et-Loire department
