= Ouroux-sous-le-Bois-Sainte-Marie =

- Commune
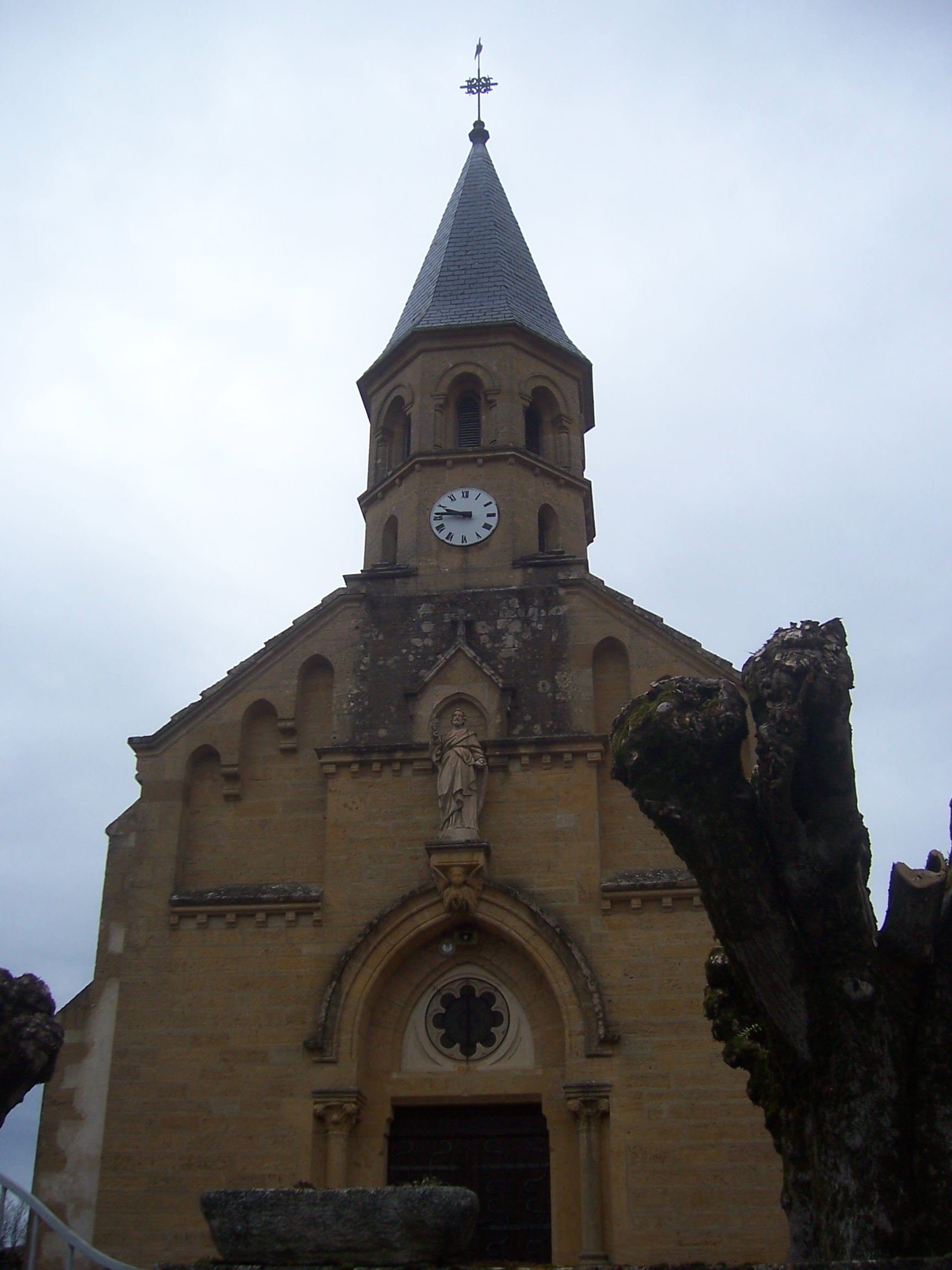
- The church in Ouroux-sous-le-Bois-Sainte-Marie
- Location of Ouroux-sous-le-Bois-Sainte-Marie
- Location within France Location within Bourgogne-Franche-Comté
- Coordinates: 46°21′36″N 4°18′42″E
- Country: France
- Region: Bourgogne-Franche-Comté
- Department: Saône-et-Loire
- Arrondissement: Charolles
- Canton: Charolles
- Area^{1}: 4.8 km^{2} (1.9 sq mi)
- Elevation: 350 m (1,150 ft)
- Highest elevation: 418 m (1,371 ft)
- Lowest elevation: 312 m (1,024 ft)
- Population (2023): 69
  - Density: 14/km^{2} (37/sq mi)
- Time zone: UTC+01:00 (CET)
  - Summer (DST): UTC+02:00 (CEST)
- INSEE/Postal code: 71335 /71800
- ^{1} French Land Register data, which excludes lakes, ponds, glaciers > 1 km^{2} (0.386 sq mi or 247 acres) and river estuaries.

Ouroux-sous-le-Bois-Sainte-Marie is a commune in the Saône-et-Loire department in the region of Bourgogne-Franche-Comté in eastern France.

== See also ==
- Communes of the Saône-et-Loire department
