= Segodunum =

Celtic place name

Segodūnum is an old Celtic place name derived from Proto-Celtic *sego-dūno-, meaning "strong fortress".

It can refer to the following locations:

- Rodez, Aveyron, former town of the Ruteni in Aquitania
- Segedunum, Wallsend, England.
- Suin, Saône-et-Loire
- Syon Haute-Savoie
- Würzburg, Bavaria

It may have Germanic counterparts in Swedish Fornsigtuna and Sigtuna, from Proto-Germanic *siga-tūna-, Old Norse Sigtún.
