= Canton of Charolles =

Coordinates: 46.44°N 4.28°E

The canton of Charolles is an administrative division of the Saône-et-Loire department, eastern France. Its borders were modified at the French canton reorganisation which came into effect in March 2015. Its seat is in Charolles.

It consists of the following communes:

1. Ballore
2. Baron
3. Beaubery
4. Champlecy
5. Changy
6. Charolles
7. Colombier-en-Brionnais
8. Dyo
9. Fontenay
10. Grandvaux
11. Lugny-lès-Charolles
12. Marcilly-la-Gueurce
13. Martigny-le-Comte
14. Mornay
15. Oudry
16. Ouroux-sous-le-Bois-Sainte-Marie
17. Ozolles
18. Palinges
19. Pouilloux
20. Prizy
21. Le Rousset-Marizy
22. Saint-Aubin-en-Charollais
23. Saint-Bonnet-de-Joux
24. Saint-Bonnet-de-Vieille-Vigne
25. Saint-Germain-en-Brionnais
26. Saint-Julien-de-Civry
27. Saint-Romain-sous-Gourdon
28. Saint-Vincent-Bragny
29. Suin
30. Vaudebarrier
31. Vendenesse-lès-Charolles
32. Viry
