= Viry, Saône-et-Loire =

Viry
- Commune
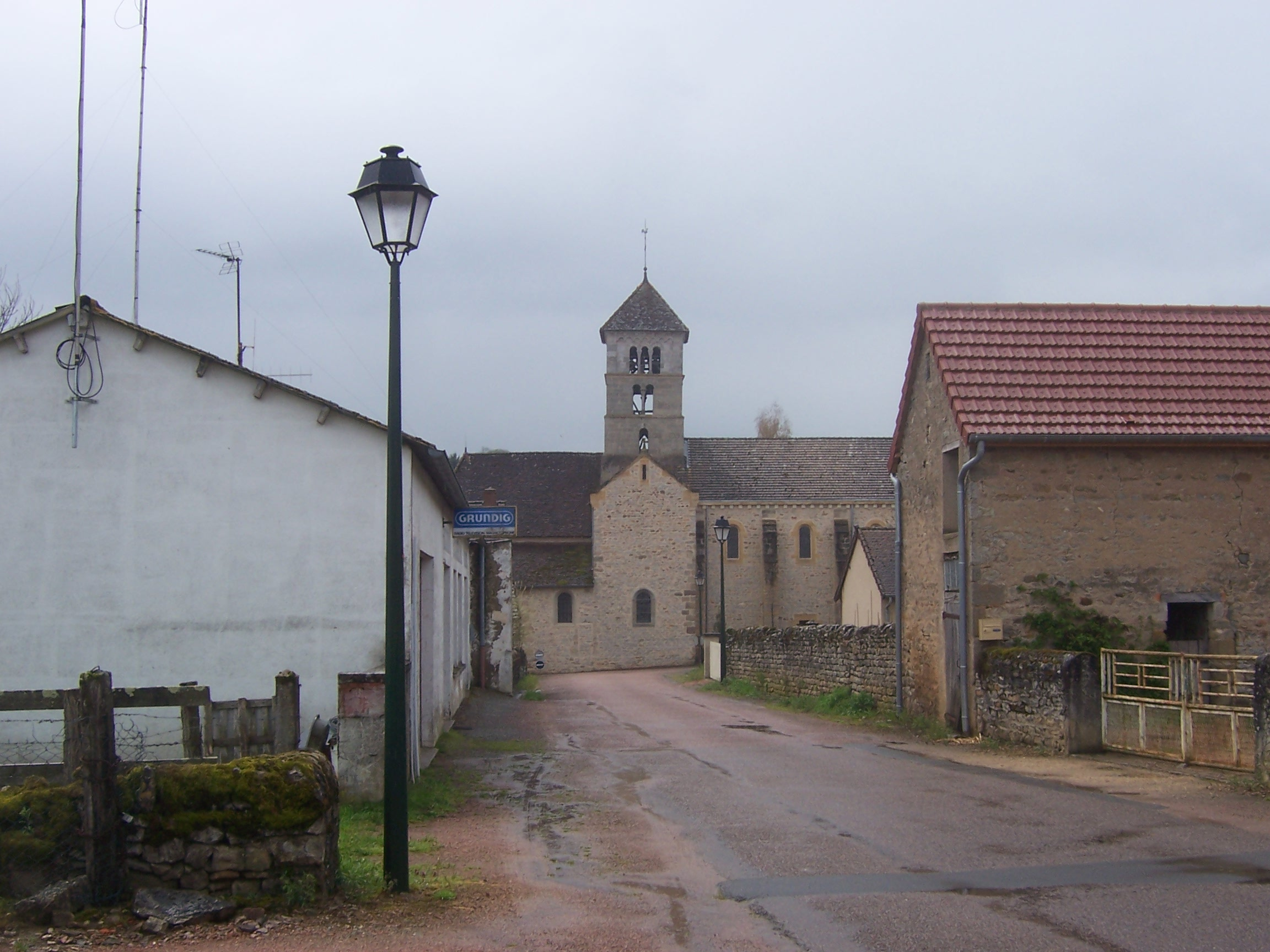
- The church and surroundings in Viry
- Location of Viry
- Location within France Location within Bourgogne-Franche-Comté
- Coordinates: 46°28′23″N 4°20′06″E
- Country: France
- Region: Bourgogne-Franche-Comté
- Department: Saône-et-Loire
- Arrondissement: Charolles
- Canton: Charolles
- Area^{1}: 20.14 km^{2} (7.78 sq mi)
- Elevation: 286 m (938 ft)
- Highest elevation: 430 m (1,410 ft)
- Lowest elevation: 279 m (915 ft)
- Population (2023): 261
  - Density: 13.0/km^{2} (33.6/sq mi)
- Time zone: UTC+01:00 (CET)
  - Summer (DST): UTC+02:00 (CEST)
- INSEE/Postal code: 71586 /71120
- ^{1} French Land Register data, which excludes lakes, ponds, glaciers > 1 km^{2} (0.386 sq mi or 247 acres) and river estuaries.

Viry (French pronunciation: [viʁi]) is a commune in the Saône-et-Loire department in the region of Bourgogne-Franche-Comté in eastern France.

== Geography ==
The Arconce forms part of the commune's northeastern border, flows southwest through the middle of the commune, then forms part of its southwestern border. The village lies in the middle of the commune, on the right bank of the Arconce.

== See also ==
- Communes of the Saône-et-Loire department
