= Mornay, Saône-et-Loire =

Mornay
- Commune
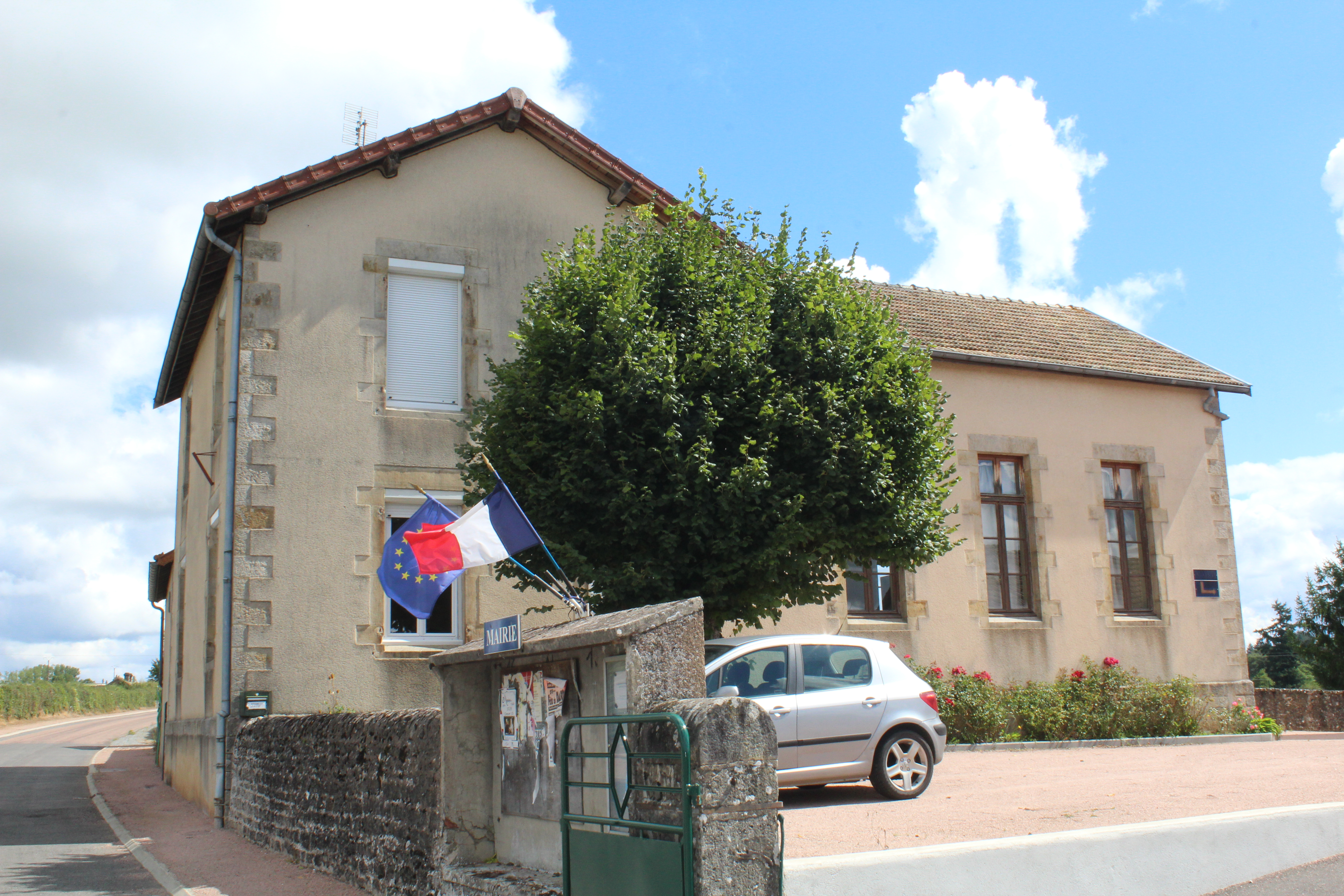
- The town hall in Mornay
- Location of Mornay
- Location within France Location within Bourgogne-Franche-Comté
- Coordinates: 46°30′26″N 4°22′45″E
- Country: France
- Region: Bourgogne-Franche-Comté
- Department: Saône-et-Loire
- Arrondissement: Charolles
- Canton: Charolles
- Area^{1}: 20.18 km^{2} (7.79 sq mi)
- Elevation: 320 m (1,050 ft)
- Highest elevation: 432 m (1,417 ft)
- Lowest elevation: 290 m (950 ft)
- Population (2023): 146
  - Density: 7.23/km^{2} (18.7/sq mi)
- Time zone: UTC+01:00 (CET)
  - Summer (DST): UTC+02:00 (CEST)
- INSEE/Postal code: 71323 /71220
- ^{1} French Land Register data, which excludes lakes, ponds, glaciers > 1 km^{2} (0.386 sq mi or 247 acres) and river estuaries.

Mornay (French pronunciation: [mɔʁnɛ]) is a commune in the Saône-et-Loire department in the region of Bourgogne-Franche-Comté in eastern France.

== Geography ==
The Arconce forms the commune's western border.

== See also ==
- Communes of the Saône-et-Loire department
