= Oudry, Saône-et-Loire =

Oudry
- Commune
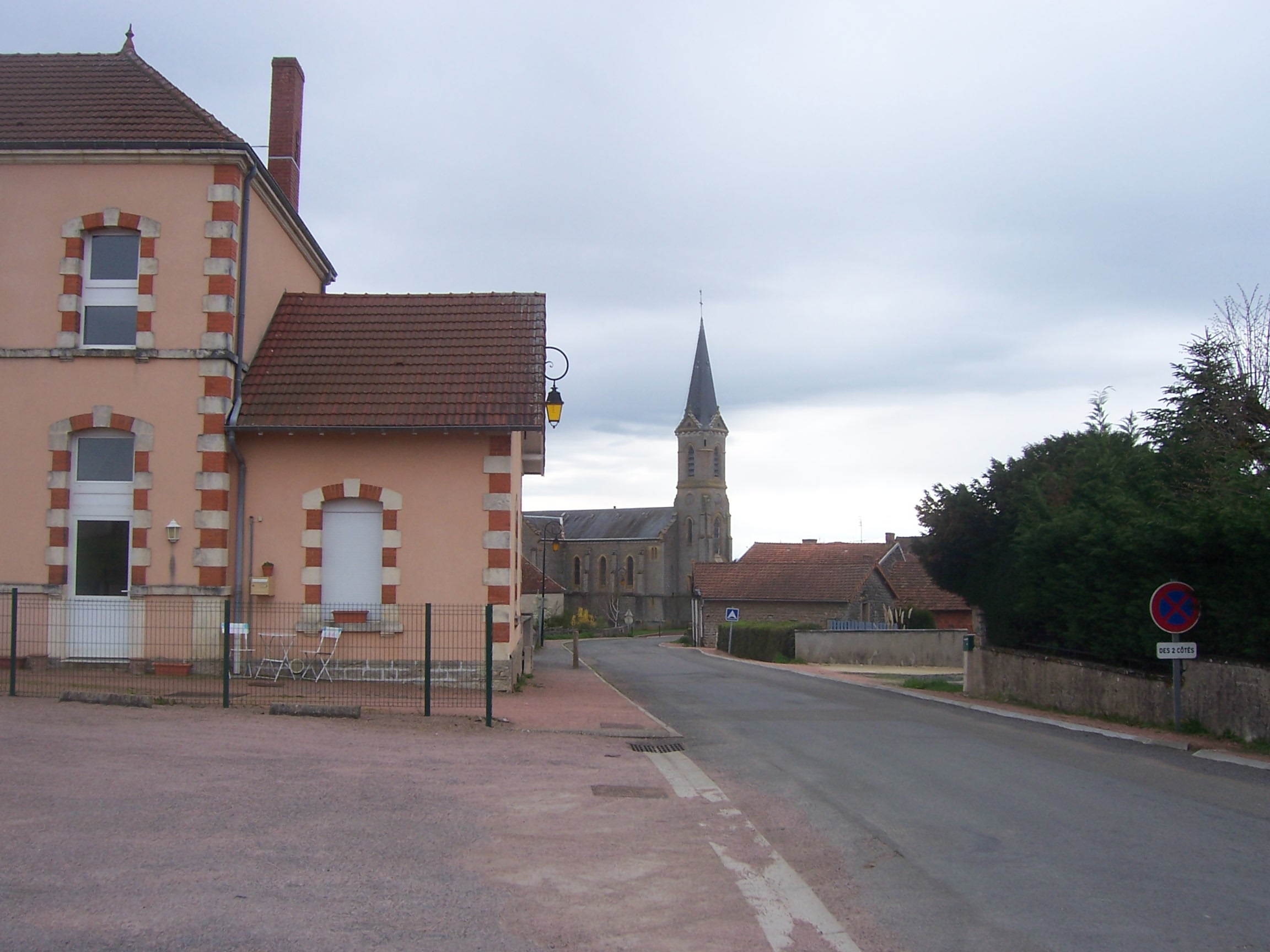
- The church and surroundings in Oudry
- Location of Oudry
- Location within France Location within Bourgogne-Franche-Comté
- Coordinates: 46°34′34″N 4°09′25″E
- Country: France
- Region: Bourgogne-Franche-Comté
- Department: Saône-et-Loire
- Arrondissement: Charolles
- Canton: Charolles
- Area^{1}: 20.78 km^{2} (8.02 sq mi)
- Elevation: 270 m (890 ft)
- Highest elevation: 344 m (1,129 ft)
- Lowest elevation: 259 m (850 ft)
- Population (2023): 387
  - Density: 18.6/km^{2} (48.2/sq mi)
- Time zone: UTC+01:00 (CET)
  - Summer (DST): UTC+02:00 (CEST)
- INSEE/Postal code: 71334 /71420
- ^{1} French Land Register data, which excludes lakes, ponds, glaciers > 1 km^{2} (0.386 sq mi or 247 acres) and river estuaries.

Oudry (French pronunciation: [udʁi]) is a commune in the Saône-et-Loire department in the region of Bourgogne-Franche-Comté in eastern France.

== See also ==
- Communes of the Saône-et-Loire department
