= Charolles =

- Subprefecture and commune
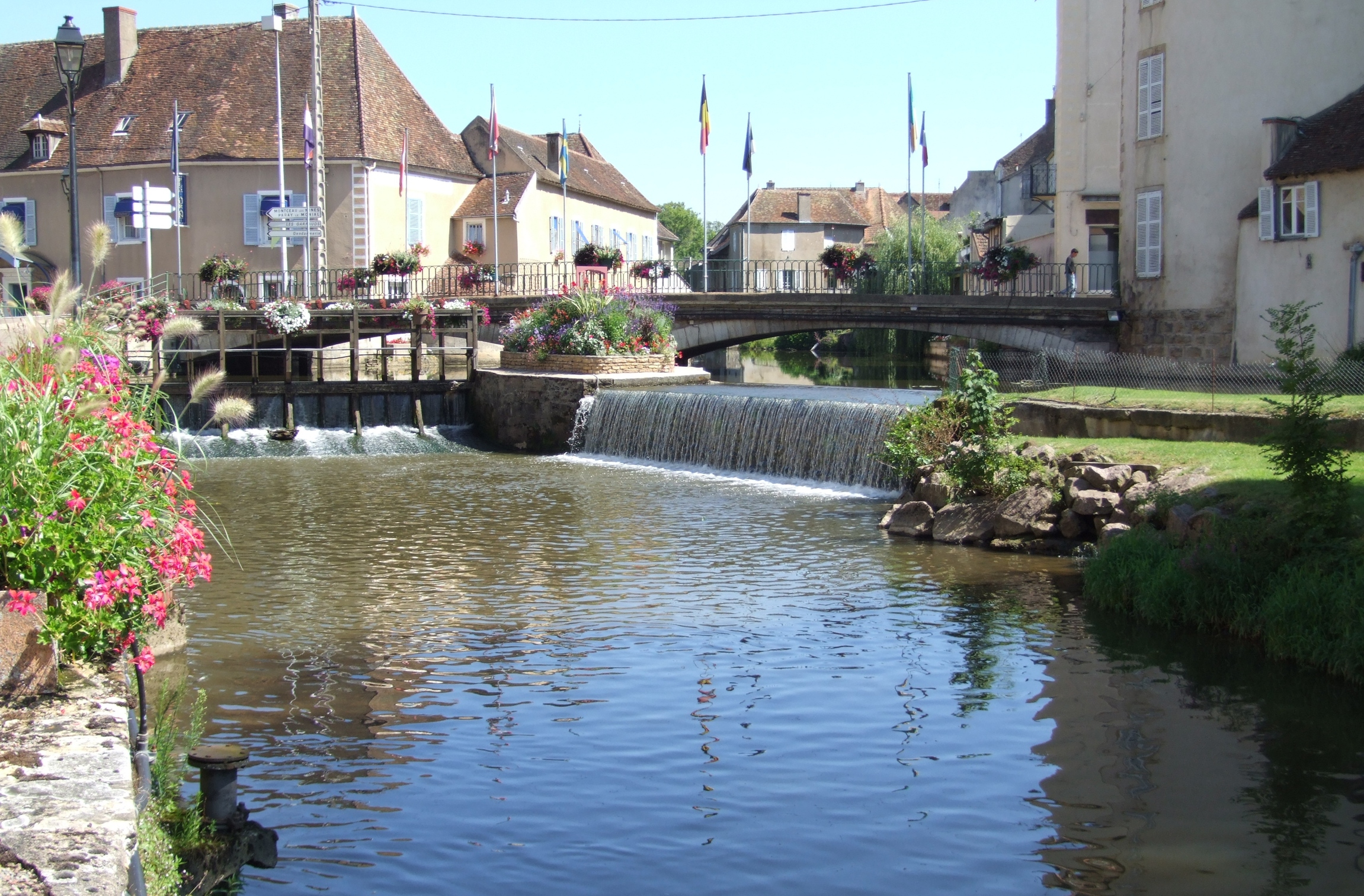
- The confluence of the Semence with Arconce in Charolles

- Coat of arms
- Location of Charolles
- Location within France Location within Bourgogne-Franche-Comté
- Coordinates: 46°26′04″N 4°16′31″E
- Country: France
- Region: Bourgogne-Franche-Comté
- Department: Saône-et-Loire
- Arrondissement: Charolles
- Canton: Charolles

Government
  - Mayor (2020–2026): Pierre Berthier
- Area^{1}: 19.92 km^{2} (7.69 sq mi)
- Elevation: 282 m (925 ft)
- Population (2023): 2,772
  - Density: 139.2/km^{2} (360.4/sq mi)
- Time zone: UTC+01:00 (CET)
  - Summer (DST): UTC+02:00 (CEST)
- INSEE/Postal code: 71106 /71120
- ^{1} French Land Register data, which excludes lakes, ponds, glaciers > 1 km^{2} (0.386 sq mi or 247 acres) and river estuaries.

Charolles (French pronunciation: [ʃaʁɔl]; Burgundian: Tsarolles) is a commune in the eastern French department of Saône-et-Loire.

The commune is listed as a Village étape.

== Geography ==
Charolles is located at the confluence of the Semence and the Arconce rivers, 60 kilometres (37 mi) west-northwest of Mâcon.

== History ==
Charolles was the capital of Charolais, an old division of France, which from the early 14th century gave the title of count to its possessors. In 1327, the county passed by marriage to the house of Armagnac, and in 1390 it was sold to Philip of Burgundy. After the death of Charles the Bold, who in his youth had borne the title of count of Charolais, it was seized by Louis XI of France, but in 1493 it was ceded by Charles VIII to Maximilian of Austria, the representative of the Burgundian family. Ultimately passing to the Spanish kings, it became for a considerable period an object of dispute between France and Spain, until at length in 1684 it was assigned to the great Condé, a creditor of the king of Spain. It was united to the French crown in 1771.

== Population ==
Historical population
Year	Pop.	±% p.a.
1968	3,813	—
1975	3,858	+0.17%
1982	3,392	−1.82%
1990	3,048	−1.33%
1999	3,027	−0.08%
2007	2,829	−0.84%
2012	2,773	−0.40%
2017	2,785	+0.09%
2023	2,772	−0.08%
Source: INSEE

== Sights ==
The ruin of the castle of the counts of Charolais occupies the summit of a hill in the immediate vicinity of the town.

== Economy ==
According to the Encyclopædia Britannica Eleventh Edition, in the early 20th century there were stone quarries in the vicinity; the town manufactured pottery, and was the centre for trade in the famous breed of Charolais cattle and in agricultural products.

== Tourism ==
In the Southern Bourgogne-Franche-Comté area, you can see :

- The Arboretum de Pézanin, one of the richest forest collection in France, near Charolles,
- The Rock of Solutré,
- The Cluny abbey and its medieval city,
- Mâcon, Paray-le-Monial, La Clayette...

== People ==
Charolles was the birthplace of:

- Louis Jacolliot (1837–1890), author
- Albert Roux (born 1935) and Michel Roux (1941–2020), French-born Michelin-starred restaurateurs working in Britain

== Climate ==
Climate in this area has mild differences between highs and lows, and there is adequate rainfall year-round. The Köppen Climate Classification subtype for this climate is "Cfb". (Marine West Coast Climate/Oceanic climate).

Climate data for Charolles
Month	Jan	Feb	Mar	Apr	May	Jun	Jul	Aug	Sep	Oct	Nov	Dec	Year
Mean daily maximum °C (°F)	6 (43)	8 (46)	13 (55)	16 (60)	19 (66)	23 (73)	25 (77)	24 (76)	22 (71)	16 (61)	10 (50)	6 (42)	16 (60)
Daily mean °C (°F)	2 (36)	3 (38)	7 (44)	9 (49)	13 (56)	17 (62)	18 (65)	18 (65)	16 (60)	11 (51)	6 (43)	2 (36)	11 (51)
Mean daily minimum °C (°F)	−1 (30)	−1 (30)	1 (34)	4 (39)	8 (46)	11 (52)	12 (54)	12 (54)	10 (50)	6 (42)	2 (36)	−1 (31)	6 (42)
Average precipitation mm (inches)	66 (2.6)	56 (2.2)	53 (2.1)	56 (2.2)	71 (2.8)	71 (2.8)	61 (2.4)	76 (3)	76 (3)	66 (2.6)	71 (2.8)	66 (2.6)	780 (30.7)
Source: Weatherbase

== See also ==
- Communes of the Saône-et-Loire department
