= Jean Raquin =

French politician (1935–2026)

President of the General Council of Jura
- In office March 2008 – March 2011
- Preceded by: Gérard Bailly
- Succeeded by: Christophe Perny

Member of the General Council of Jura for the Canton of Bletterans
- In office March 1994 – March 2015
- Preceded by: Jean Perraudin
- Succeeded by: Philippe Antoine

Personal details
- Born: 4 December 1935 Iguerande, France
- Died: 3 May 2026 (aged 90) Lons-le-Saunier, France
- Party: UMP
- Occupation: Farmer

Jean Raquin (French: [ʒˈɑ̃ ʁakˈɛ̃]; 4 December 1935 – 3 May 2026) was a French politician of the Union for a Popular Movement (UMP).

Raquin served the Canton of Bletterans in the General Council of Jura from 1994 to 2015, additionally serving as the General Council's president from 2008 to 2011. In office, he notably refused to comply with a European Court of Human Rights ruling when he refused to grant an adoption by a lesbian woman. He told La Voix du Jura that he prioritized adoption by heterosexual couples.

Raquin died in Lons-le-Saunier on 3 May 2026, at the age of 90.

== Decorations ==
- Knight of the Legion of Honour (2011)
