= Coublanc =

Coublanc may refer to:

- Coublanc, Haute-Marne, a commune in the French region of Champagne-Ardenne
- Coublanc, Saône-et-Loire a commune in the French region of Bourgogne
