= Saint-Maurice-lès-Châteauneuf =

- Commune
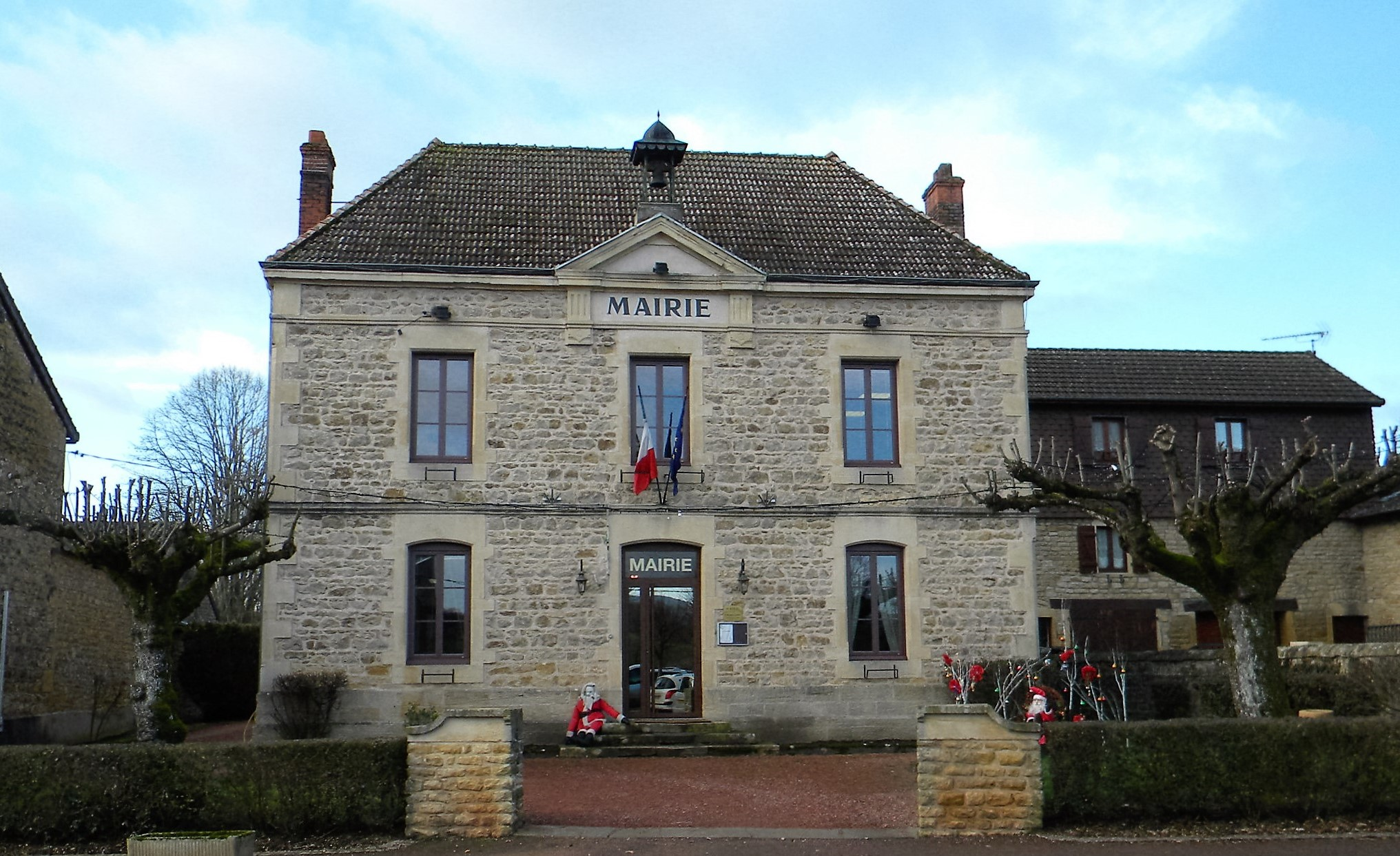
- The town hall in Saint-Maurice-lès-Châteauneuf
- Location of Saint-Maurice-lès-Châteauneuf
- Location within France Location within Bourgogne-Franche-Comté
- Coordinates: 46°13′01″N 4°15′14″E
- Country: France
- Region: Bourgogne-Franche-Comté
- Department: Saône-et-Loire
- Arrondissement: Charolles
- Canton: Chauffailles
- Area^{1}: 10.84 km^{2} (4.19 sq mi)
- Elevation: 295 m (968 ft)
- Highest elevation: 412 m (1,352 ft)
- Lowest elevation: 286 m (938 ft)
- Population (2023): 608
  - Density: 56.1/km^{2} (145/sq mi)
- Time zone: UTC+01:00 (CET)
  - Summer (DST): UTC+02:00 (CEST)
- INSEE/Postal code: 71463 /71740
- ^{1} French Land Register data, which excludes lakes, ponds, glaciers > 1 km^{2} (0.386 sq mi or 247 acres) and river estuaries.

Saint-Maurice-lès-Châteauneuf (French pronunciation: [sɛ̃ mɔʁis lɛ ʃɑtonœf]; literally "Saint-Maurice near Châteauneuf") is a commune in the Saône-et-Loire department in the region of Bourgogne-Franche-Comté in eastern France.

== See also ==
- Communes of the Saône-et-Loire department
