= Oyé =

- Commune
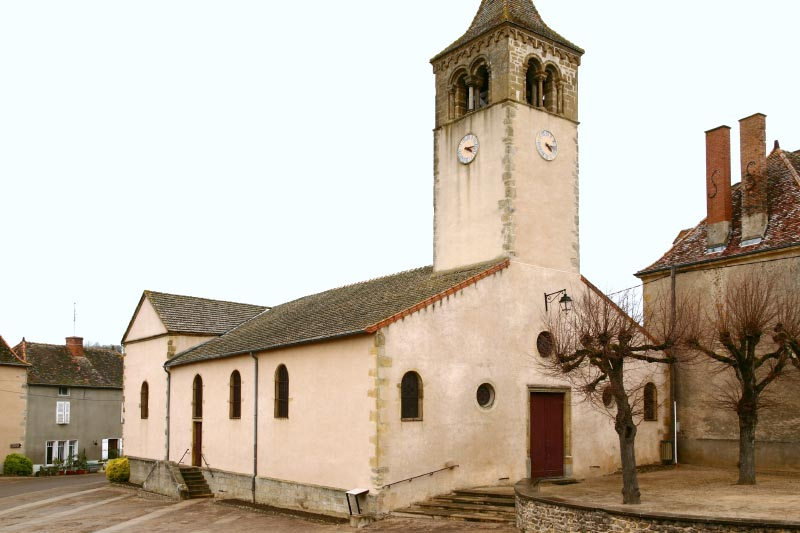
- The church in Oyé
- Location of Oyé
- Location within France Location within Bourgogne-Franche-Comté
- Coordinates: 46°19′30″N 4°11′33″E
- Country: France
- Region: Bourgogne-Franche-Comté
- Department: Saône-et-Loire
- Arrondissement: Charolles
- Canton: Chauffailles

Government
  - Mayor (2020–2026): Dominique Zanetto
- Area^{1}: 18.38 km^{2} (7.10 sq mi)
- Elevation: 400 m (1,300 ft)
- Highest elevation: 497 m (1,631 ft)
- Lowest elevation: 273 m (896 ft)
- Population (2023): 271
  - Density: 14.7/km^{2} (38.2/sq mi)
- Time zone: UTC+01:00 (CET)
  - Summer (DST): UTC+02:00 (CEST)
- INSEE/Postal code: 71337 /71800
- ^{1} French Land Register data, which excludes lakes, ponds, glaciers > 1 km^{2} (0.386 sq mi or 247 acres) and river estuaries.

Oyé (French pronunciation: [ɔje]) is a commune in the Saône-et-Loire department in the region of Bourgogne-Franche-Comté in eastern France.

== See also ==
- Communes of the Saône-et-Loire department
