= Canton of Chauffailles =

Coordinates: 46.21°N 4.34°E

The canton of Chauffailles is an administrative division of the Saône-et-Loire department, eastern France. Its borders were modified at the French canton reorganisation which came into effect in March 2015. Its seat is in Chauffailles.

It consists of the following communes:

1. Amanzé
2. Anglure-sous-Dun
3. Baudemont
4. Bois-Sainte-Marie
5. Briant
6. La Chapelle-sous-Dun
7. Chassigny-sous-Dun
8. Châteauneuf
9. Châtenay
10. Chauffailles
11. La Clayette
12. Coublanc
13. Curbigny
14. Fleury-la-Montagne
15. Gibles
16. Iguerande
17. Ligny-en-Brionnais
18. Mailly
19. Mussy-sous-Dun
20. Oyé
21. Saint-Bonnet-de-Cray
22. Saint-Christophe-en-Brionnais
23. Saint-Didier-en-Brionnais
24. Saint-Edmond
25. Sainte-Foy
26. Saint-Igny-de-Roche
27. Saint-Julien-de-Jonzy
28. Saint-Laurent-en-Brionnais
29. Saint-Martin-de-Lixy
30. Saint-Maurice-lès-Châteauneuf
31. Saint-Racho
32. Saint-Symphorien-des-Bois
33. Sarry
34. Semur-en-Brionnais
35. Tancon
36. Vareilles
37. Varenne-l'Arconce
38. Varennes-sous-Dun
39. Vauban
