= Saint-Igny-de-Roche =

- Commune
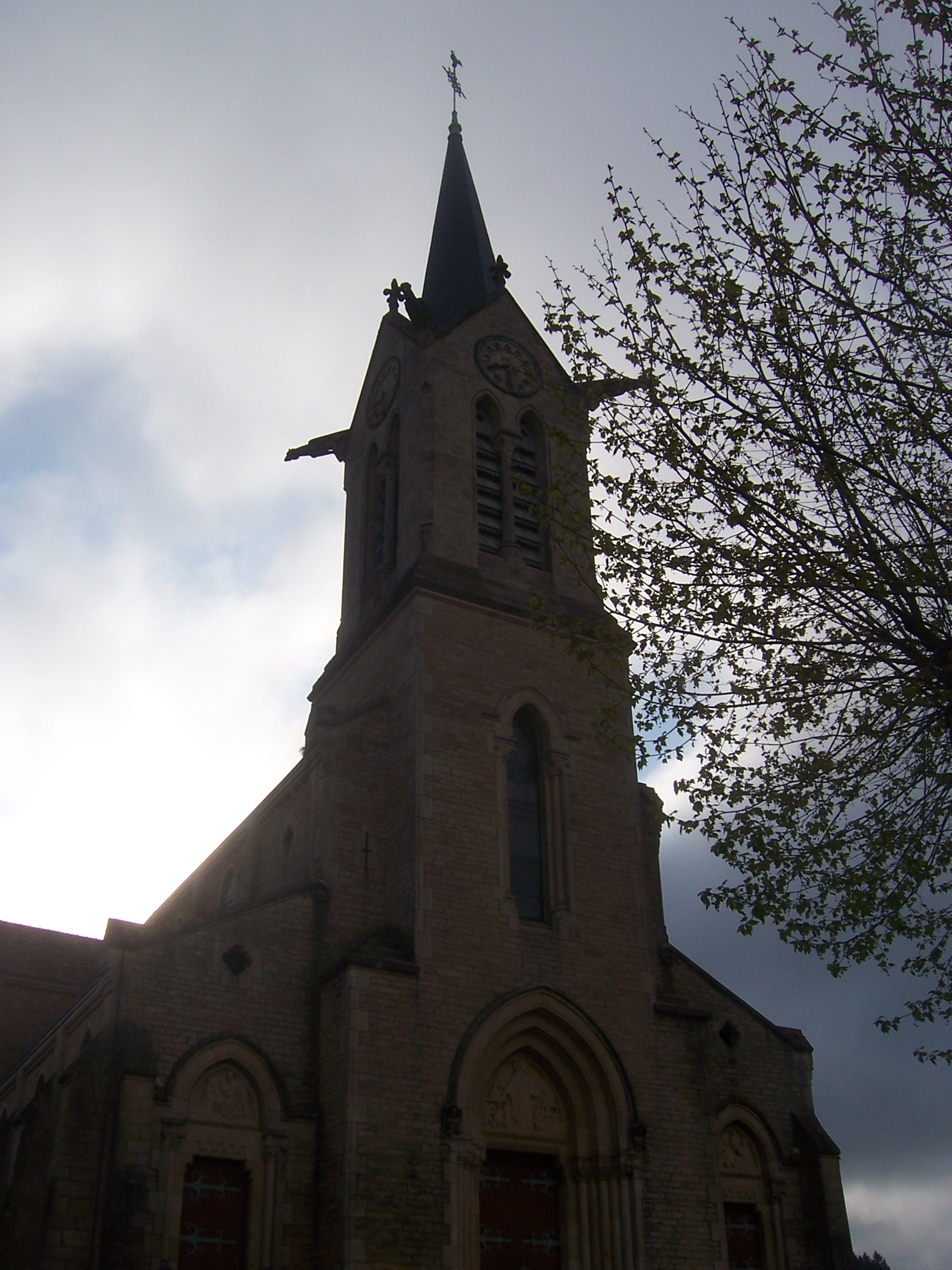
- The church in Saint-Igny-de-Roche
- Location of Saint-Igny-de-Roche
- Location within France Location within Bourgogne-Franche-Comté
- Coordinates: 46°11′33″N 4°17′48″E
- Country: France
- Region: Bourgogne-Franche-Comté
- Department: Saône-et-Loire
- Arrondissement: Charolles
- Canton: Chauffailles
- Area^{1}: 7.94 km^{2} (3.07 sq mi)
- Highest elevation: 520 m (1,710 ft)
- Lowest elevation: 339 m (1,112 ft)
- Population (2023): 789
  - Density: 99.4/km^{2} (257/sq mi)
- Time zone: UTC+01:00 (CET)
  - Summer (DST): UTC+02:00 (CEST)
- INSEE/Postal code: 71428 /71170
- ^{1} French Land Register data, which excludes lakes, ponds, glaciers > 1 km^{2} (0.386 sq mi or 247 acres) and river estuaries.

Saint-Igny-de-Roche (French pronunciation: [sɛ̃.t‿iɲi də ʁɔʃ]) is a commune in the Saône-et-Loire department in the region of Bourgogne-Franche-Comté in eastern France.

== See also ==
- Communes of the Saône-et-Loire department
