= Amanzé =

- Commune
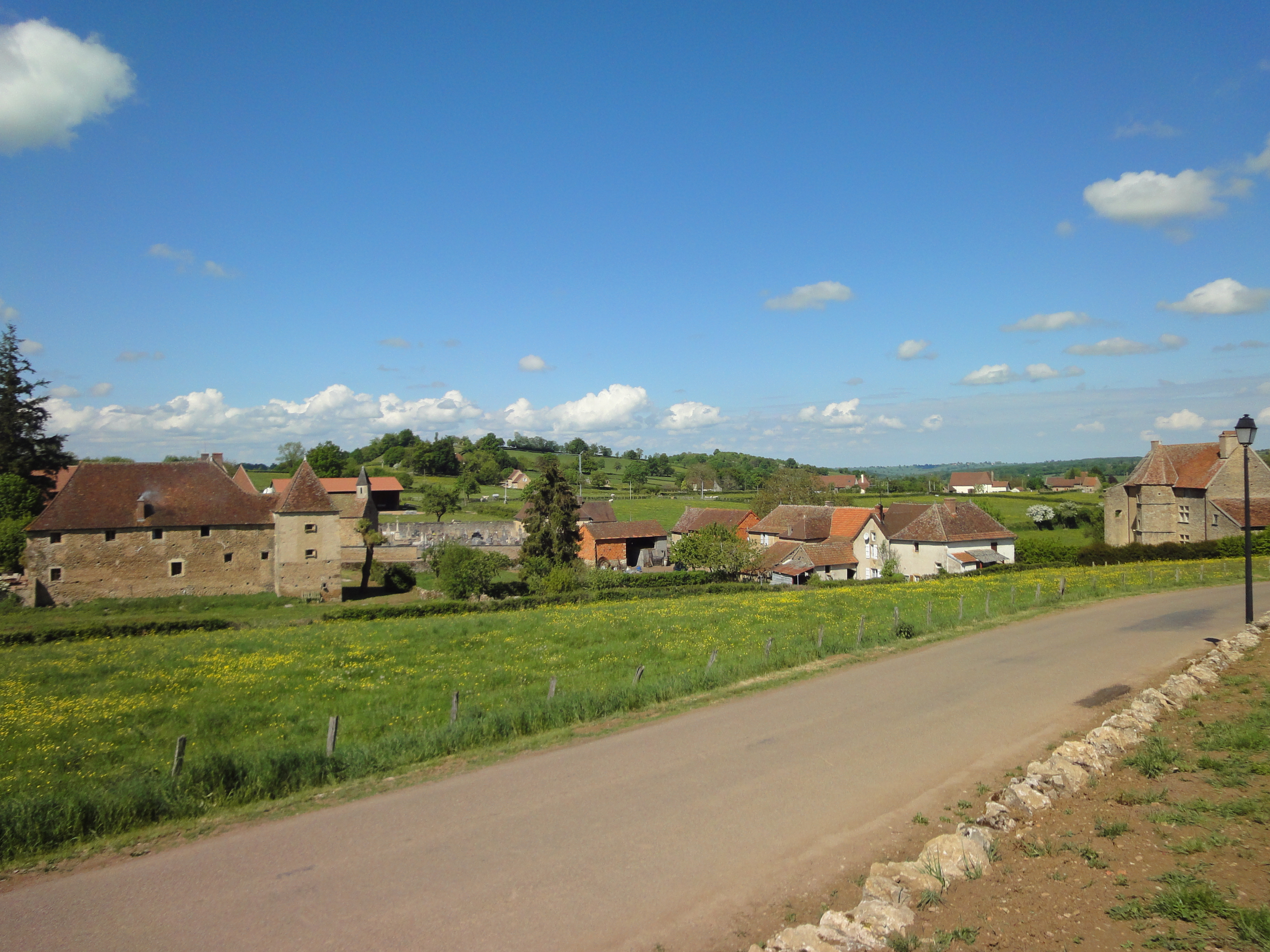
- Location of Amanzé
- Location within France Location within Bourgogne-Franche-Comté
- Coordinates: 46°19′58″N 4°14′32″E
- Country: France
- Region: Bourgogne-Franche-Comté
- Department: Saône-et-Loire
- Arrondissement: Charolles
- Canton: Chauffailles
- Intercommunality: CC Brionnais Sud Bourgogne

Government
  - Mayor (2020–2026): Philippe Paperin
- Area^{1}: 11.29 km^{2} (4.36 sq mi)
- Elevation: 380 m (1,250 ft)
- Highest elevation: 463 m (1,519 ft)
- Lowest elevation: 289 m (948 ft)
- Population (2023): 196
  - Density: 17.4/km^{2} (45.0/sq mi)
- Time zone: UTC+01:00 (CET)
  - Summer (DST): UTC+02:00 (CEST)
- INSEE/Postal code: 71006 /71800
- ^{1} French Land Register data, which excludes lakes, ponds, glaciers > 1 km^{2} (0.386 sq mi or 247 acres) and river estuaries.

Amanzé (French pronunciation: [amɑ̃ze]) is a commune in the Saône-et-Loire department in the Bourgogne-Franche-Comté region in eastern France.

== Population ==
Historical population
Year	Pop.	±% p.a.
1968	197	—
1975	161	−2.84%
1982	179	+1.53%
1990	198	+1.27%
1999	203	+0.28%
2007	210	+0.42%
2012	169	−4.25%
2017	176	+0.82%
2023	196	+1.81%
Source: INSEE

== See also ==
- Communes of the Saône-et-Loire department
