= Saint-Edmond =

- Commune
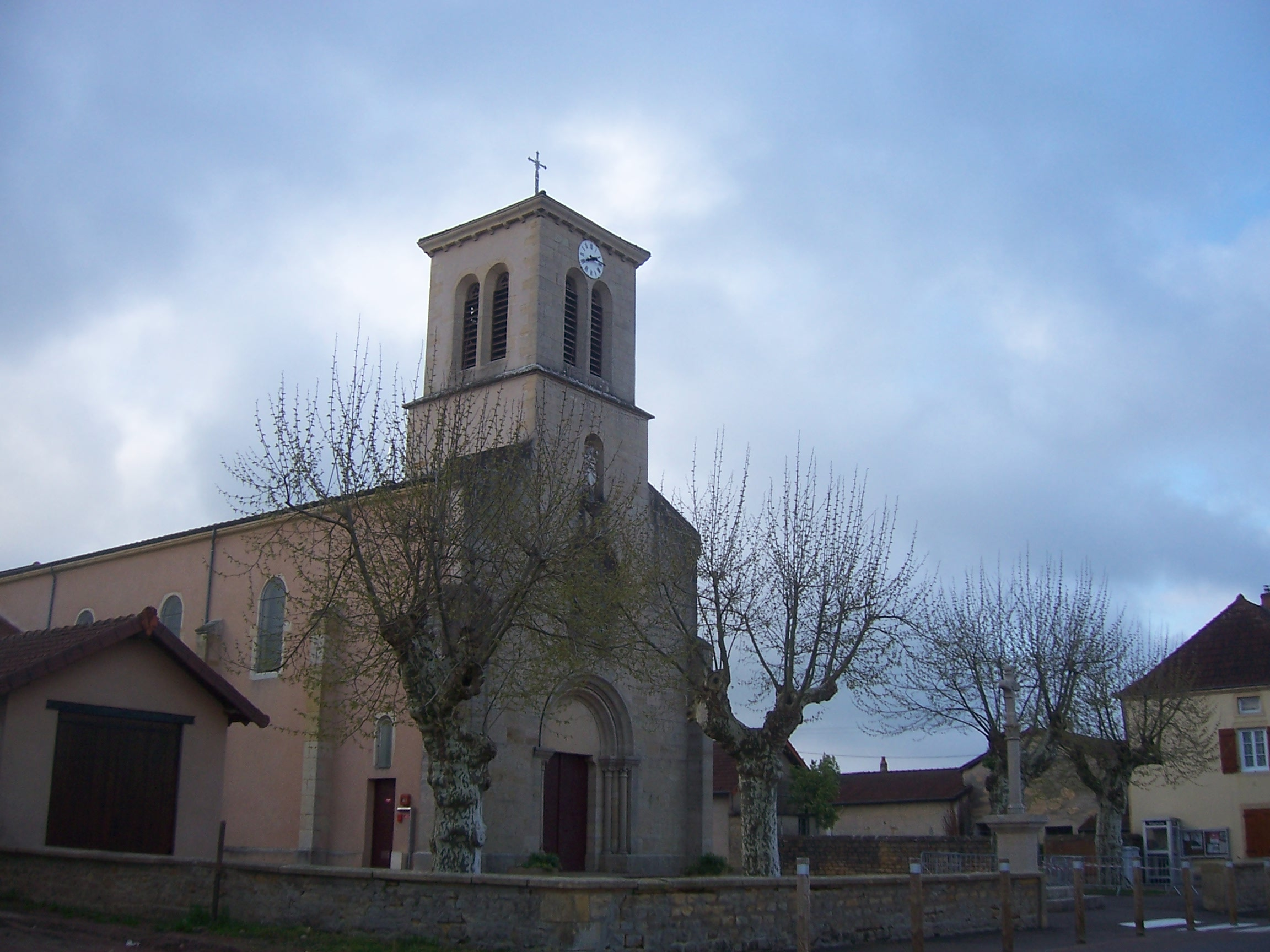
- The church in Saint-Edmond
- Location of Saint-Edmond
- Location within France Location within Bourgogne-Franche-Comté
- Coordinates: 46°12′18″N 4°12′49″E
- Country: France
- Region: Bourgogne-Franche-Comté
- Department: Saône-et-Loire
- Arrondissement: Charolles
- Canton: Chauffailles
- Area^{1}: 10.38 km^{2} (4.01 sq mi)
- Elevation: 387 m (1,270 ft)
- Highest elevation: 387 m (1,270 ft)
- Lowest elevation: 279 m (915 ft)
- Population (2023): 414
  - Density: 39.9/km^{2} (103/sq mi)
- Time zone: UTC+01:00 (CET)
  - Summer (DST): UTC+02:00 (CEST)
- INSEE/Postal code: 71408 /71740
- ^{1} French Land Register data, which excludes lakes, ponds, glaciers > 1 km^{2} (0.386 sq mi or 247 acres) and river estuaries.

Saint-Edmond (French pronunciation: [sɛ̃.t‿ɛdmɔ̃]) is a commune in the Saône-et-Loire department in the region of Bourgogne-Franche-Comté in eastern France.

== See also ==
- Communes of the Saône-et-Loire department
