= Gibles =

- Commune
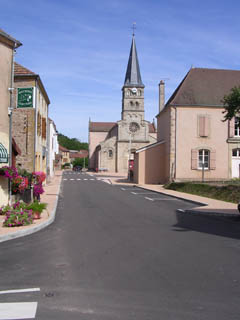
- The church and surroundings in Gibles
- Location of Gibles
- Location within France Location within Bourgogne-Franche-Comté
- Coordinates: 46°19′31″N 4°22′47″E
- Country: France
- Region: Bourgogne-Franche-Comté
- Department: Saône-et-Loire
- Arrondissement: Charolles
- Canton: Chauffailles

Government
  - Mayor (2020–2026): Bernard Grisard
- Area^{1}: 19.66 km^{2} (7.59 sq mi)
- Elevation: 465 m (1,526 ft)
- Highest elevation: 691 m (2,267 ft)
- Lowest elevation: 343 m (1,125 ft)
- Population (2023): 571
  - Density: 29.0/km^{2} (75.2/sq mi)
- Time zone: UTC+01:00 (CET)
  - Summer (DST): UTC+02:00 (CEST)
- INSEE/Postal code: 71218 /71800
- ^{1} French Land Register data, which excludes lakes, ponds, glaciers > 1 km^{2} (0.386 sq mi or 247 acres) and river estuaries.

Gibles (French pronunciation: [ʒibl]) is a commune in the Saône-et-Loire department in the region of Bourgogne-Franche-Comté in eastern France.

== Administration ==
Mayors of Gibles have included:

- 1955-1977 Louis Gatille
- 1977-1995 Jean Grisard
- 1995-2014 Jean-Claude Renon
- 2014-incumbent Bernard Grisard

== Geography ==
Gibles is part of the Brionnais countryside. It is situated:

- 10 minutes from La Clayette
- 20 minutes from Charolles
- 30 minutes from Paray-Le-Monial
- 40 minutes from Roanne
- 45 minutes from Mâcon

== Demography ==
Historical population
Year	Pop.	±% p.a.
1968	729	—
1975	677	−1.05%
1982	680	+0.06%
1990	604	−1.47%
1999	608	+0.07%
2007	653	+0.90%
2012	615	−1.19%
2017	590	−0.83%
2023	571	−0.54%
Source: INSEE

== Places of interest ==
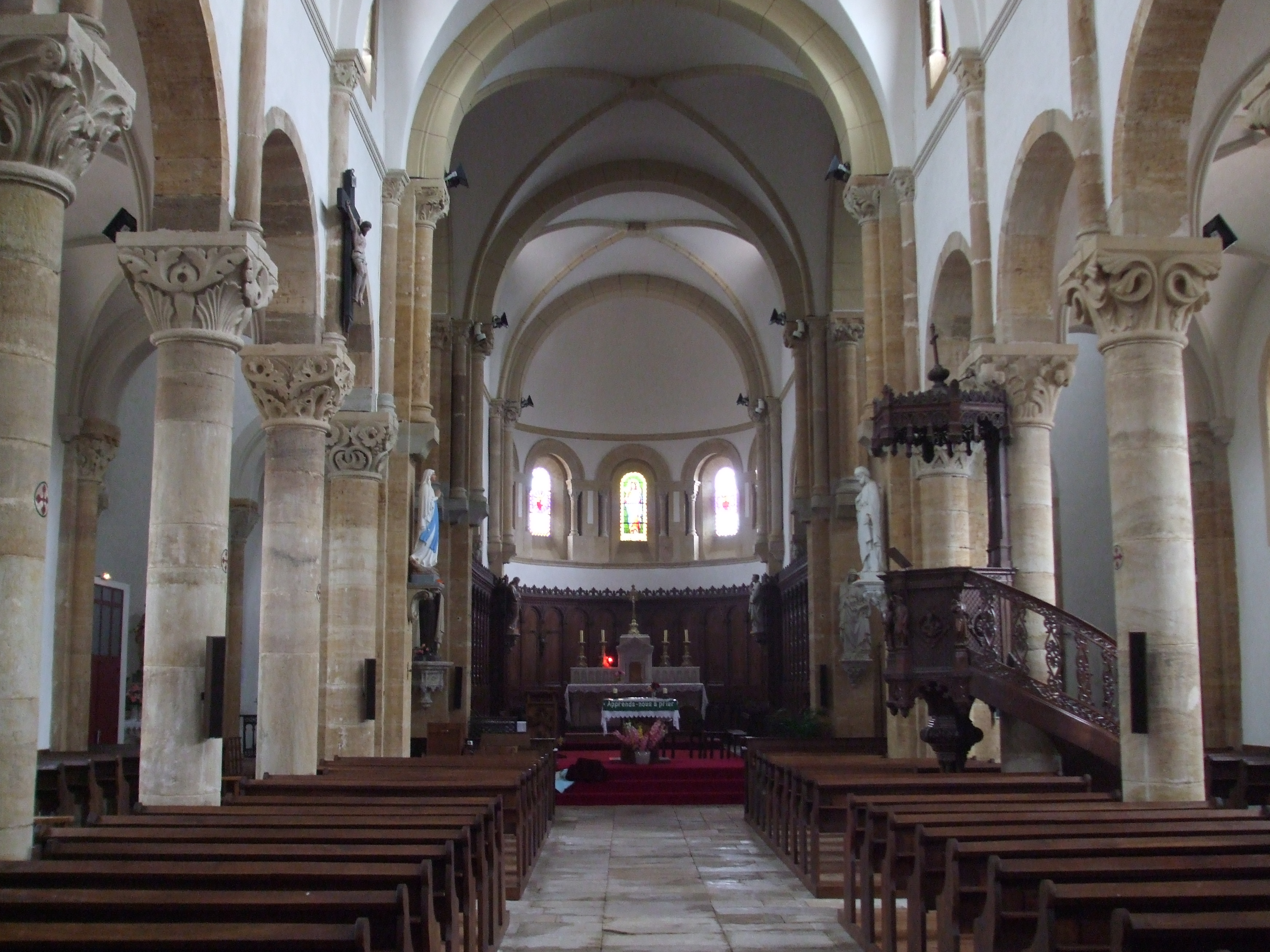
L'intérieur de l'Église de Gibles

== See also ==
- Communes of the Saône-et-Loire department
