= Fleury-la-Montagne =

- Commune
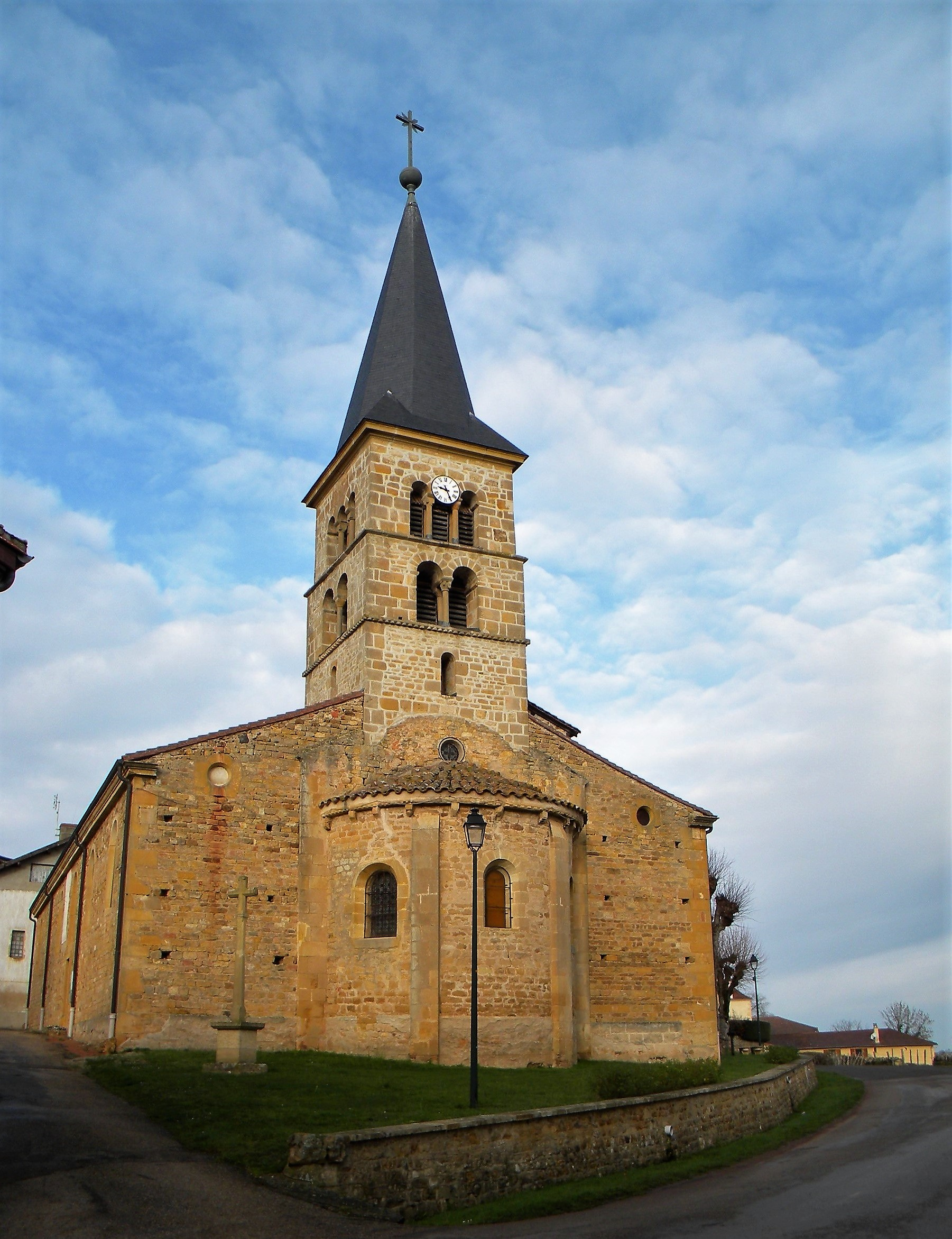
- The church in Fleury-la-Montagne
- Location of Fleury-la-Montagne
- Location within France Location within Bourgogne-Franche-Comté
- Coordinates: 46°12′18″N 4°07′14″E
- Country: France
- Region: Bourgogne-Franche-Comté
- Department: Saône-et-Loire
- Arrondissement: Charolles
- Canton: Chauffailles
- Area^{1}: 8.75 km^{2} (3.38 sq mi)
- Elevation: 430 m (1,410 ft)
- Highest elevation: 445 m (1,460 ft)
- Lowest elevation: 304 m (997 ft)
- Population (2023): 726
  - Density: 83.0/km^{2} (215/sq mi)
- Time zone: UTC+01:00 (CET)
  - Summer (DST): UTC+02:00 (CEST)
- INSEE/Postal code: 71200 /71340
- ^{1} French Land Register data, which excludes lakes, ponds, glaciers > 1 km^{2} (0.386 sq mi or 247 acres) and river estuaries.

Fleury-la-Montagne (French pronunciation: [flœʁi la mɔ̃taɲ]) is a commune in the Saône-et-Loire department in the region of Bourgogne-Franche-Comté in eastern France.

== See also ==
- Communes of the Saône-et-Loire department
