= Bois-Sainte-Marie =

- Commune
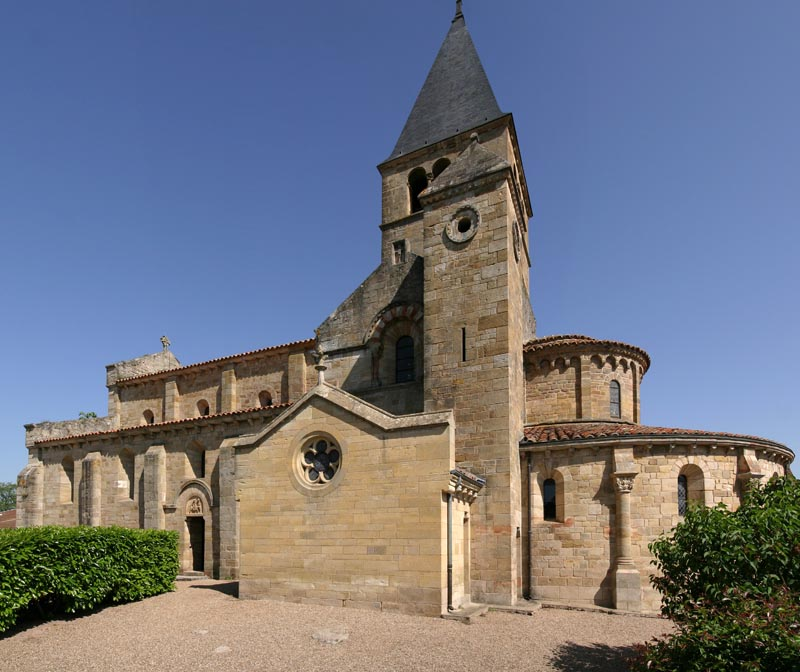
- The church in Bois-Sainte-Marie
- Location of Bois-Sainte-Marie
- Location within France Location within Bourgogne-Franche-Comté
- Coordinates: 46°19′48″N 4°21′21″E
- Country: France
- Region: Bourgogne-Franche-Comté
- Department: Saône-et-Loire
- Arrondissement: Charolles
- Canton: Chauffailles
- Intercommunality: CC Brionnais Sud Bourgogne
- Area^{1}: 2.69 km^{2} (1.04 sq mi)
- Elevation: 415 m (1,362 ft)
- Highest elevation: 462 m (1,516 ft)
- Lowest elevation: 390 m (1,280 ft)
- Population (2023): 189
  - Density: 70.3/km^{2} (182/sq mi)
- Time zone: UTC+01:00 (CET)
  - Summer (DST): UTC+02:00 (CEST)
- INSEE/Postal code: 71041 /71800
- ^{1} French Land Register data, which excludes lakes, ponds, glaciers > 1 km^{2} (0.386 sq mi or 247 acres) and river estuaries.

Bois-Sainte-Marie (French pronunciation: [bwa sɛ̃t maʁi]) is a commune in the Saône-et-Loire department in the region of Bourgogne-Franche-Comté in eastern France.

== See also ==
- Communes of the Saône-et-Loire department
