= Saint-Martin-de-Lixy =

- Commune
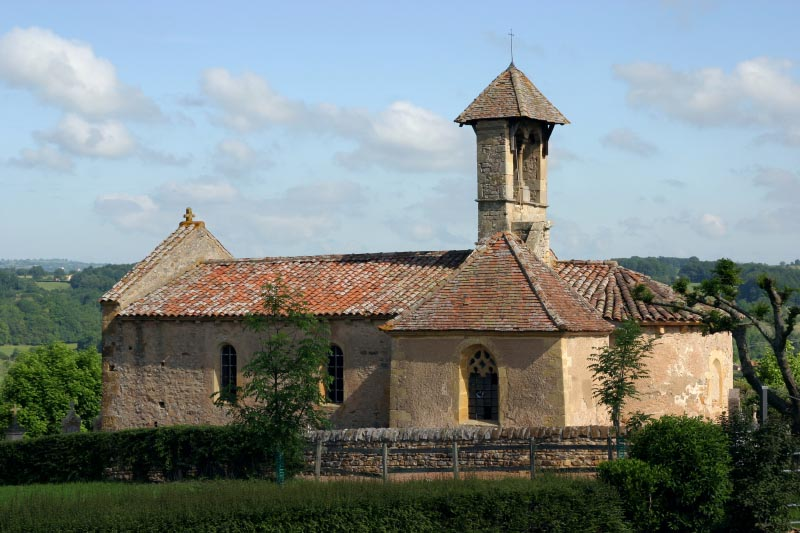
- The church in Saint-Martin-de-Lixy
- Location of Saint-Martin-de-Lixy
- Location within France Location within Bourgogne-Franche-Comté
- Coordinates: 46°12′14″N 4°14′48″E
- Country: France
- Region: Bourgogne-Franche-Comté
- Department: Saône-et-Loire
- Arrondissement: Charolles
- Canton: Chauffailles
- Area^{1}: 4.19 km^{2} (1.62 sq mi)
- Elevation: 350 m (1,150 ft)
- Highest elevation: 414 m (1,358 ft)
- Lowest elevation: 280 m (920 ft)
- Population (2023): 91
  - Density: 22/km^{2} (56/sq mi)
- Time zone: UTC+01:00 (CET)
  - Summer (DST): UTC+02:00 (CEST)
- INSEE/Postal code: 71451 /71740
- ^{1} French Land Register data, which excludes lakes, ponds, glaciers > 1 km^{2} (0.386 sq mi or 247 acres) and river estuaries.

Saint-Martin-de-Lixy is a commune in the Saône-et-Loire department in the region of Bourgogne-Franche-Comté in eastern France.

== See also ==
- Communes of the Saône-et-Loire department
