= Saint-Julien-de-Jonzy =

- Commune
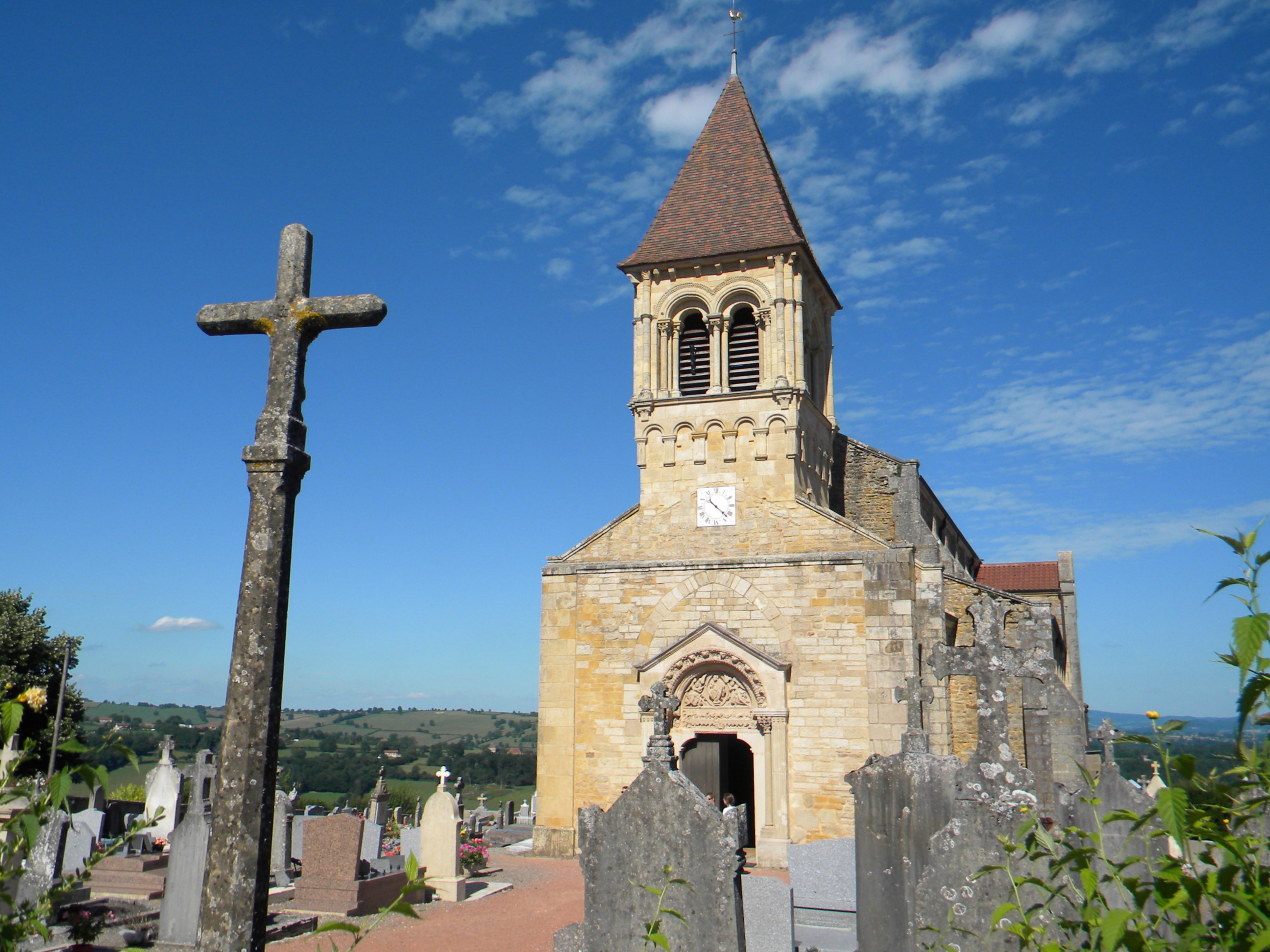
- The church in Saint-Julien-de-Jonzy
- Location of Saint-Julien-de-Jonzy
- Location within France Location within Bourgogne-Franche-Comté
- Coordinates: 46°14′15″N 4°08′36″E
- Country: France
- Region: Bourgogne-Franche-Comté
- Department: Saône-et-Loire
- Arrondissement: Charolles
- Canton: Chauffailles
- Area^{1}: 22.66 km^{2} (8.75 sq mi)
- Elevation: 501 m (1,644 ft)
- Highest elevation: 542 m (1,778 ft)
- Lowest elevation: 330 m (1,080 ft)
- Population (2023): 335
  - Density: 14.8/km^{2} (38.3/sq mi)
- Time zone: UTC+01:00 (CET)
  - Summer (DST): UTC+02:00 (CEST)
- INSEE/Postal code: 71434 /71110
- ^{1} French Land Register data, which excludes lakes, ponds, glaciers > 1 km^{2} (0.386 sq mi or 247 acres) and river estuaries.

Saint-Julien-de-Jonzy (French pronunciation: [sɛ̃ ʒyljɛ̃ də ʒɔ̃zi]) is a commune in the Saône-et-Loire department in the region of Bourgogne-Franche-Comté in eastern France.

== See also ==
- Communes of the Saône-et-Loire department
