= Chassigny-sous-Dun =

- Commune
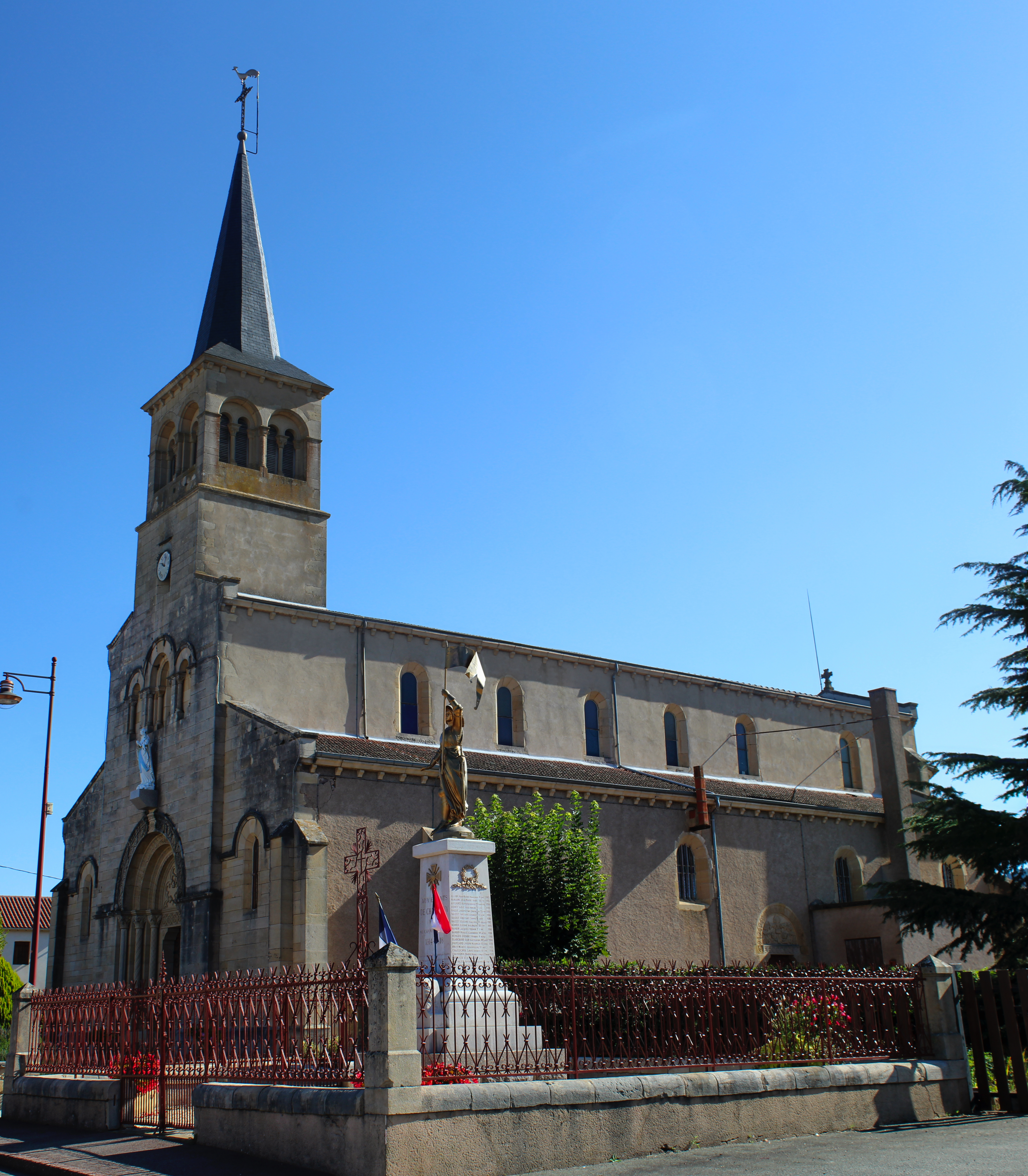
- The church in Chassigny-sous-Dun
- Location of Chassigny-sous-Dun
- Location within France Location within Bourgogne-Franche-Comté
- Coordinates: 46°14′23″N 4°17′42″E
- Country: France
- Region: Bourgogne-Franche-Comté
- Department: Saône-et-Loire
- Arrondissement: Charolles
- Canton: Chauffailles

Government
  - Mayor (2020–2026): Marie-Anne Bois
- Area^{1}: 13.28 km^{2} (5.13 sq mi)
- Elevation: 380 m (1,250 ft)
- Highest elevation: 546 m (1,791 ft)
- Lowest elevation: 305 m (1,001 ft)
- Population (2023): 569
  - Density: 42.8/km^{2} (111/sq mi)
- Time zone: UTC+01:00 (CET)
  - Summer (DST): UTC+02:00 (CEST)
- INSEE/Postal code: 71110 /71170
- ^{1} French Land Register data, which excludes lakes, ponds, glaciers > 1 km^{2} (0.386 sq mi or 247 acres) and river estuaries.

Chassigny-sous-Dun (French pronunciation: [ʃasiɲi su dœ̃]) is a commune in the Saône-et-Loire department in the region of Bourgogne-Franche-Comté in eastern France.

== See also ==
- Communes of the Saône-et-Loire department
