= Vauban, Saône-et-Loire =

Vauban
- Commune
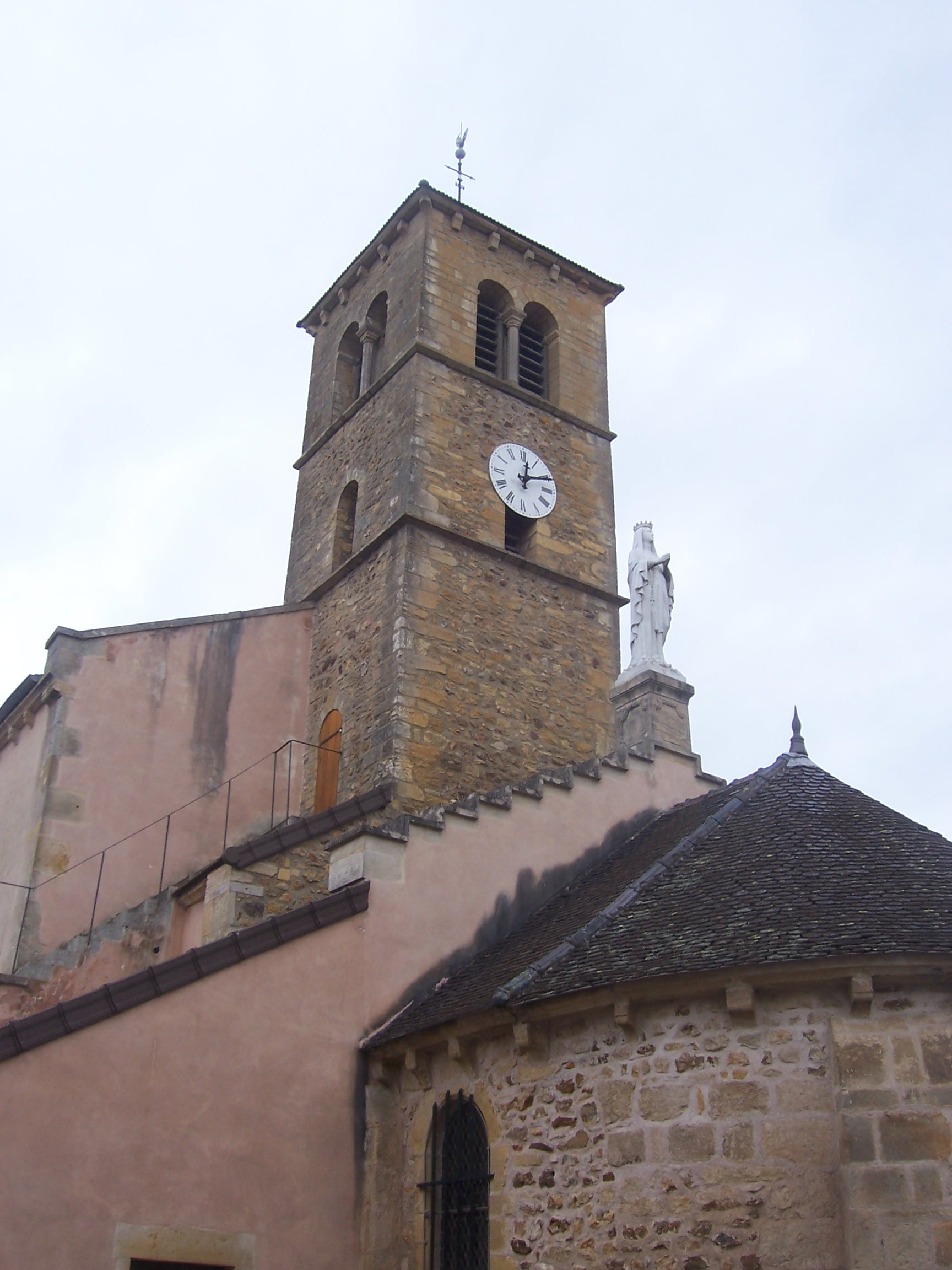
- The church in Vauban
- Location of Vauban
- Location within France Location within Bourgogne-Franche-Comté
- Coordinates: 46°15′42″N 4°13′27″E
- Country: France
- Region: Bourgogne-Franche-Comté
- Department: Saône-et-Loire
- Arrondissement: Charolles
- Canton: Chauffailles
- Area^{1}: 13.63 km^{2} (5.26 sq mi)
- Elevation: 419 m (1,375 ft)
- Highest elevation: 508 m (1,667 ft)
- Lowest elevation: 339 m (1,112 ft)
- Population (2023): 242
  - Density: 17.8/km^{2} (46.0/sq mi)
- Time zone: UTC+01:00 (CET)
  - Summer (DST): UTC+02:00 (CEST)
- INSEE/Postal code: 71561 /71800
- ^{1} French Land Register data, which excludes lakes, ponds, glaciers > 1 km^{2} (0.386 sq mi or 247 acres) and river estuaries.

Vauban (French pronunciation: [vobɑ̃]) is a commune in the Saône-et-Loire department in the region of Bourgogne-Franche-Comté in eastern France.

== See also ==
- Communes of the Saône-et-Loire department
