= Vareilles, Saône-et-Loire =

Vareilles
- Commune
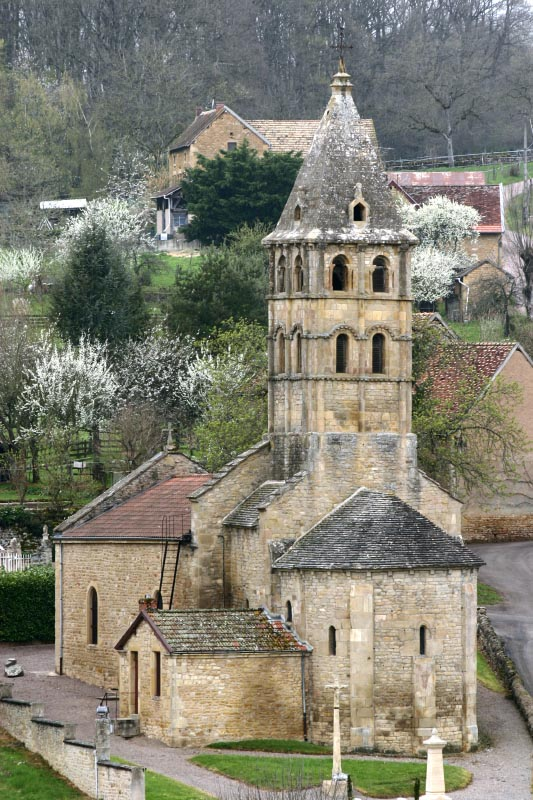
- The church in Vareilles
- Location of Vareilles
- Location within France Location within Bourgogne-Franche-Comté
- Coordinates: 46°17′56″N 4°15′41″E
- Country: France
- Region: Bourgogne-Franche-Comté
- Department: Saône-et-Loire
- Arrondissement: Charolles
- Canton: Chauffailles

Government
  - Mayor (2024–2026): Lucien Verchere
- Area^{1}: 8.62 km^{2} (3.33 sq mi)
- Elevation: 400 m (1,300 ft)
- Highest elevation: 510 m (1,670 ft)
- Lowest elevation: 357 m (1,171 ft)
- Population (2023): 276
  - Density: 32.0/km^{2} (82.9/sq mi)
- Time zone: UTC+01:00 (CET)
  - Summer (DST): UTC+02:00 (CEST)
- INSEE/Postal code: 71553 /71800
- ^{1} French Land Register data, which excludes lakes, ponds, glaciers > 1 km^{2} (0.386 sq mi or 247 acres) and river estuaries.

Vareilles (French pronunciation: [vaʁɛj]) is a commune in the Saône-et-Loire department in the region of Bourgogne-Franche-Comté in eastern France.

== See also ==
- Communes of the Saône-et-Loire department
