= Saint-Symphorien-des-Bois =

- Commune
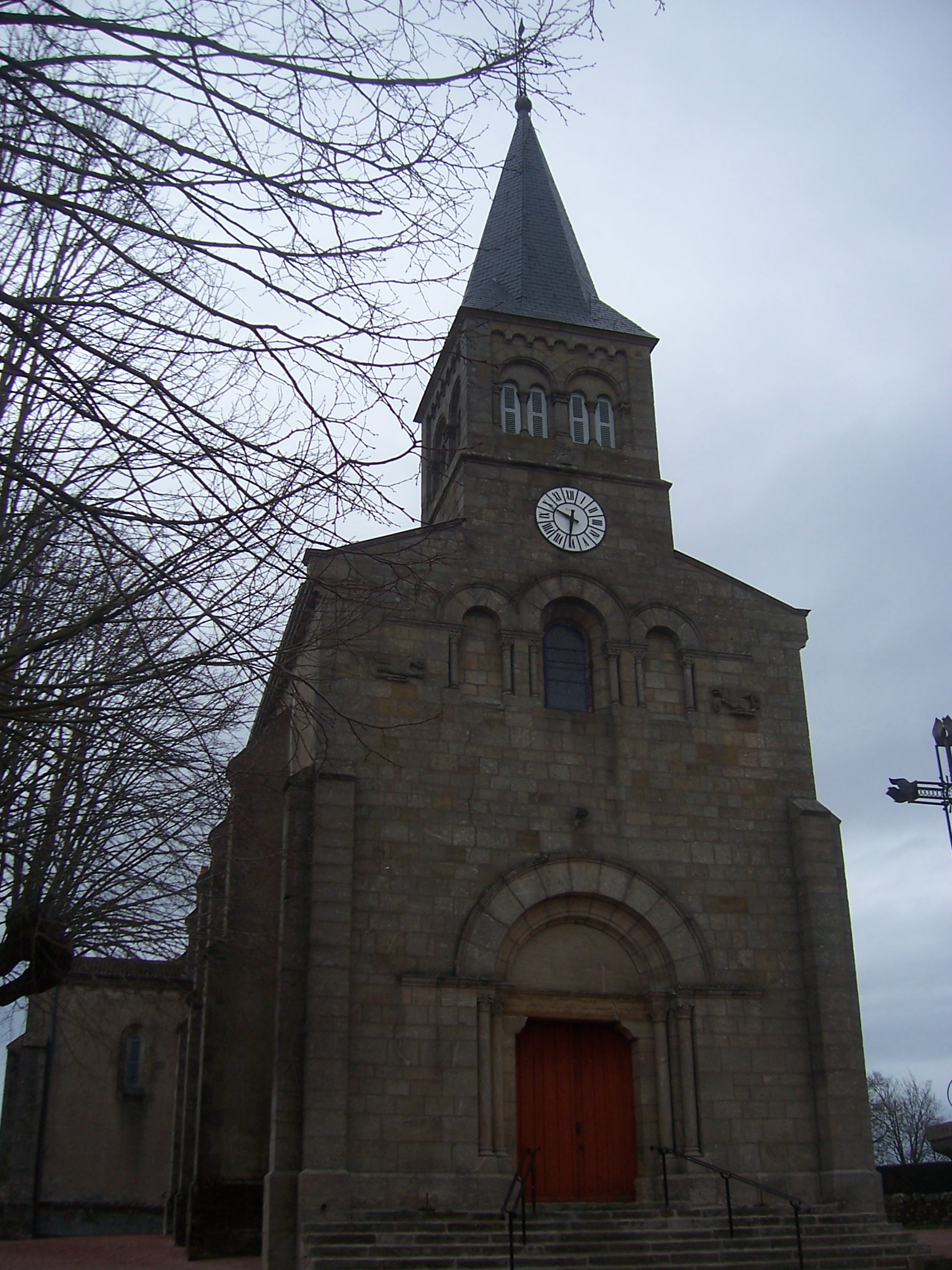
- The church in Saint-Symphorien-des-Bois
- Location of Saint-Symphorien-des-Bois
- Location within France Location within Bourgogne-Franche-Comté
- Coordinates: 46°20′05″N 4°17′04″E
- Country: France
- Region: Bourgogne-Franche-Comté
- Department: Saône-et-Loire
- Arrondissement: Charolles
- Canton: Chauffailles
- Area^{1}: 10.65 km^{2} (4.11 sq mi)
- Elevation: 450 m (1,480 ft)
- Highest elevation: 462 m (1,516 ft)
- Lowest elevation: 365 m (1,198 ft)
- Population (2023): 421
  - Density: 39.5/km^{2} (102/sq mi)
- Time zone: UTC+01:00 (CET)
  - Summer (DST): UTC+02:00 (CEST)
- INSEE/Postal code: 71483 /71800
- ^{1} French Land Register data, which excludes lakes, ponds, glaciers > 1 km^{2} (0.386 sq mi or 247 acres) and river estuaries.

Saint-Symphorien-des-Bois (French pronunciation: [sɛ̃ sɛ̃fɔʁjɛ̃ de bwa]) is a commune in the Saône-et-Loire department in the region of Bourgogne-Franche-Comté in eastern France.

== See also ==
- Communes of the Saône-et-Loire department
