= Saint-Racho =

- Commune
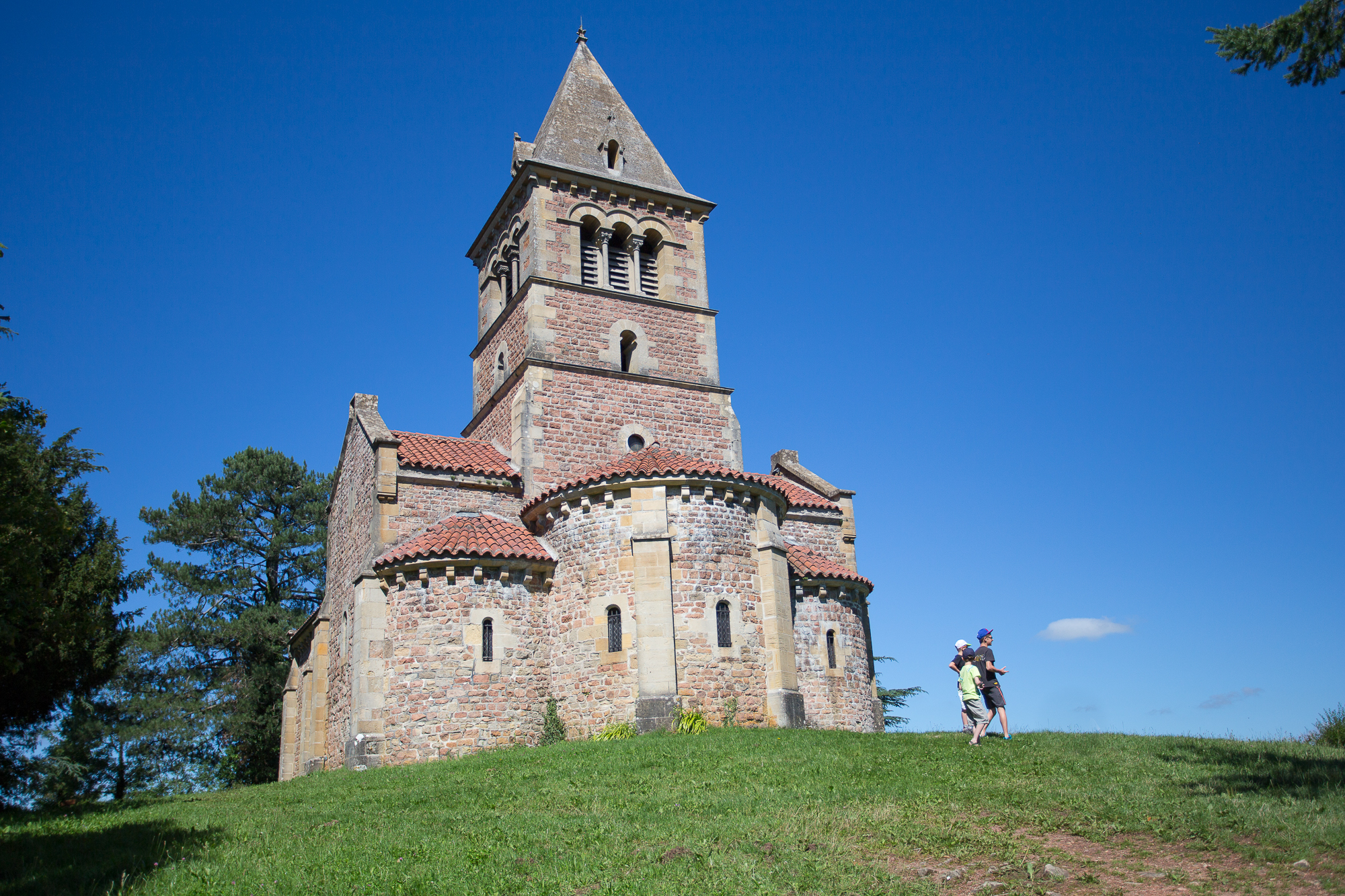
- The Dun chapel in Saint-Racho

- Coat of arms
- Location of Saint-Racho
- Location within France Location within Bourgogne-Franche-Comté
- Coordinates: 46°15′57″N 4°22′08″E
- Country: France
- Region: Bourgogne-Franche-Comté
- Department: Saône-et-Loire
- Arrondissement: Charolles
- Canton: Chauffailles

Government
  - Mayor (2021–2026): Jean Paul Besson
- Area^{1}: 10.57 km^{2} (4.08 sq mi)
- Elevation: 550 m (1,800 ft)
- Highest elevation: 728 m (2,388 ft)
- Lowest elevation: 375 m (1,230 ft)
- Population (2023): 158
  - Density: 14.9/km^{2} (38.7/sq mi)
- Time zone: UTC+01:00 (CET)
  - Summer (DST): UTC+02:00 (CEST)
- INSEE/Postal code: 71473 /71800
- ^{1} French Land Register data, which excludes lakes, ponds, glaciers > 1 km^{2} (0.386 sq mi or 247 acres) and river estuaries.

Saint-Racho (French pronunciation: [sɛ̃ ʁaʃo]) is a commune in the Saône-et-Loire department in the region of Bourgogne-Franche-Comté in eastern France.

== See also ==
- Communes of the Saône-et-Loire department
