= Curbigny =

- Commune
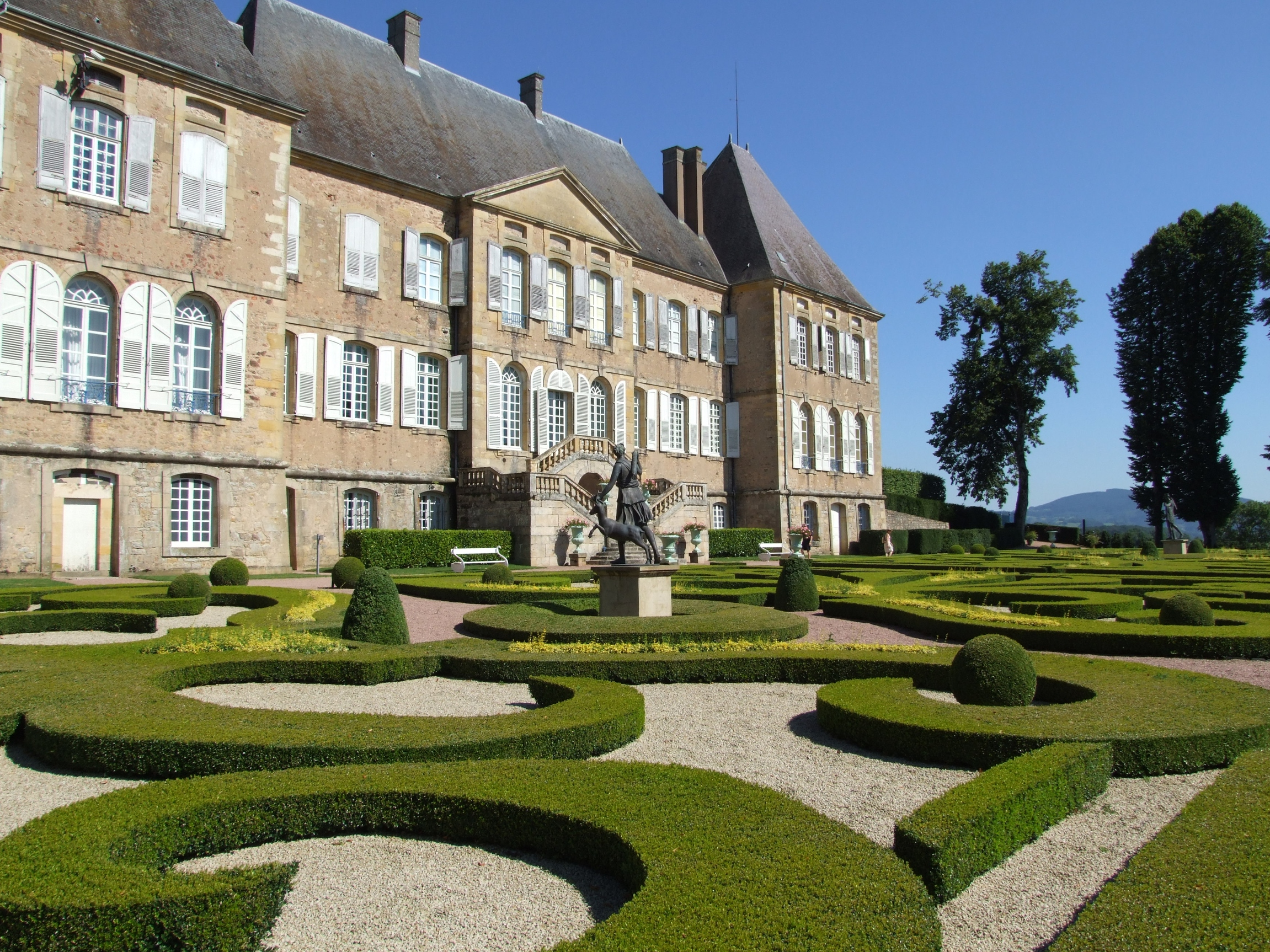
- Chateau of Drée
- Location of Curbigny
- Location within France Location within Bourgogne-Franche-Comté
- Coordinates: 46°18′30″N 4°18′44″E
- Country: France
- Region: Bourgogne-Franche-Comté
- Department: Saône-et-Loire
- Arrondissement: Charolles
- Canton: Chauffailles
- Area^{1}: 9.64 km^{2} (3.72 sq mi)
- Elevation: 400 m (1,300 ft)
- Highest elevation: 467 m (1,532 ft)
- Lowest elevation: 364 m (1,194 ft)
- Population (2023): 303
  - Density: 31.4/km^{2} (81.4/sq mi)
- Time zone: UTC+01:00 (CET)
  - Summer (DST): UTC+02:00 (CEST)
- INSEE/Postal code: 71160 /71800
- ^{1} French Land Register data, which excludes lakes, ponds, glaciers > 1 km^{2} (0.386 sq mi or 247 acres) and river estuaries.

Curbigny (French pronunciation: [kyʁbiɲi]) is a commune in the Saône-et-Loire department in the region of Bourgogne-Franche-Comté in eastern France.

== See also ==
- Communes of the Saône-et-Loire department
