= Châtenay, Saône-et-Loire =

Châtenay
- Commune
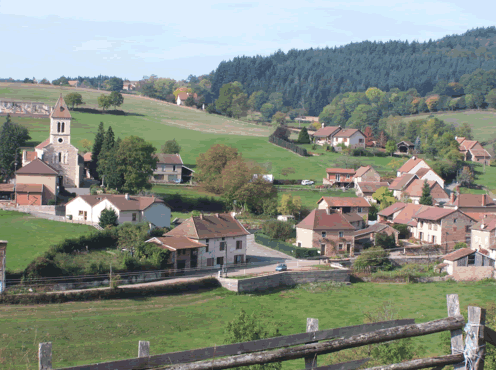
- A general view of Châtenay
- Location of Châtenay
- Location within France Location within Bourgogne-Franche-Comté
- Coordinates: 46°17′31″N 4°23′02″E
- Country: France
- Region: Bourgogne-Franche-Comté
- Department: Saône-et-Loire
- Arrondissement: Charolles
- Canton: Chauffailles
- Area^{1}: 8.07 km^{2} (3.12 sq mi)
- Elevation: 450 m (1,480 ft)
- Highest elevation: 595 m (1,952 ft)
- Lowest elevation: 380 m (1,250 ft)
- Population (2023): 166
  - Density: 20.6/km^{2} (53.3/sq mi)
- Time zone: UTC+01:00 (CET)
  - Summer (DST): UTC+02:00 (CEST)
- INSEE/Postal code: 71116 /71800
- ^{1} French Land Register data, which excludes lakes, ponds, glaciers > 1 km^{2} (0.386 sq mi or 247 acres) and river estuaries.

Châtenay is a commune in the Saône-et-Loire department in the region of Bourgogne-Franche-Comté in eastern France.

== See also ==
- Communes of the Saône-et-Loire department
