= Saint-Bonnet-de-Cray =

- Commune
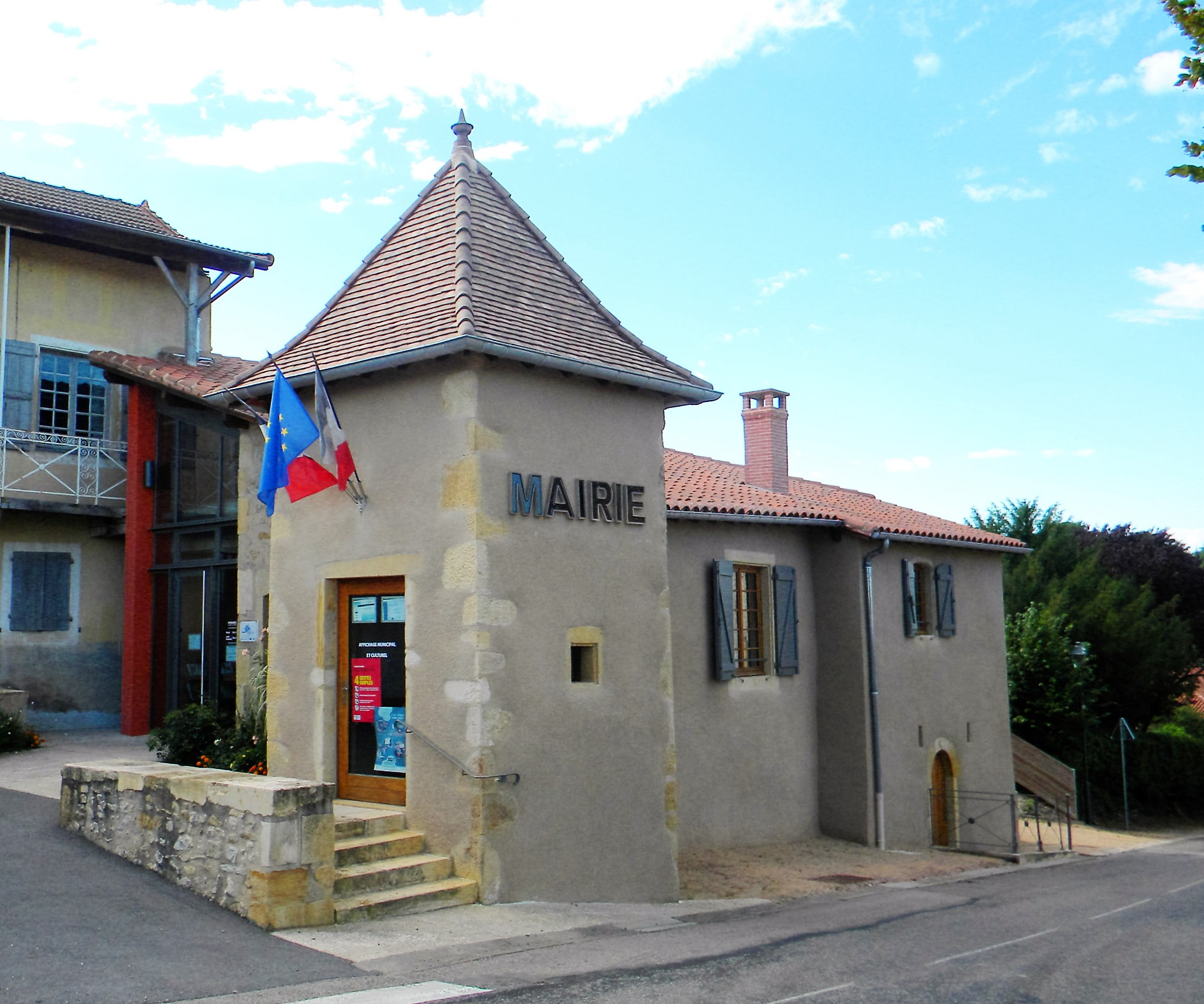
- The town hall in Saint-Bonnet-de-Cray
- Location of Saint-Bonnet-de-Cray
- Location within France Location within Bourgogne-Franche-Comté
- Coordinates: 46°12′57″N 4°08′24″E
- Country: France
- Region: Bourgogne-Franche-Comté
- Department: Saône-et-Loire
- Arrondissement: Charolles
- Canton: Chauffailles
- Area^{1}: 22.41 km^{2} (8.65 sq mi)
- Elevation: 400 m (1,300 ft)
- Highest elevation: 467 m (1,532 ft)
- Lowest elevation: 278 m (912 ft)
- Population (2023): 508
  - Density: 22.7/km^{2} (58.7/sq mi)
- Time zone: UTC+01:00 (CET)
  - Summer (DST): UTC+02:00 (CEST)
- INSEE/Postal code: 71393 /71340
- ^{1} French Land Register data, which excludes lakes, ponds, glaciers > 1 km^{2} (0.386 sq mi or 247 acres) and river estuaries.

Saint-Bonnet-de-Cray (French pronunciation: [sɛ̃ bɔnɛ də kʁɛ]) is a commune in the Saône-et-Loire department in the region of Bourgogne-Franche-Comté in eastern France.

== See also ==
- Communes of the Saône-et-Loire department
