= Mussy-sous-Dun =

- Commune
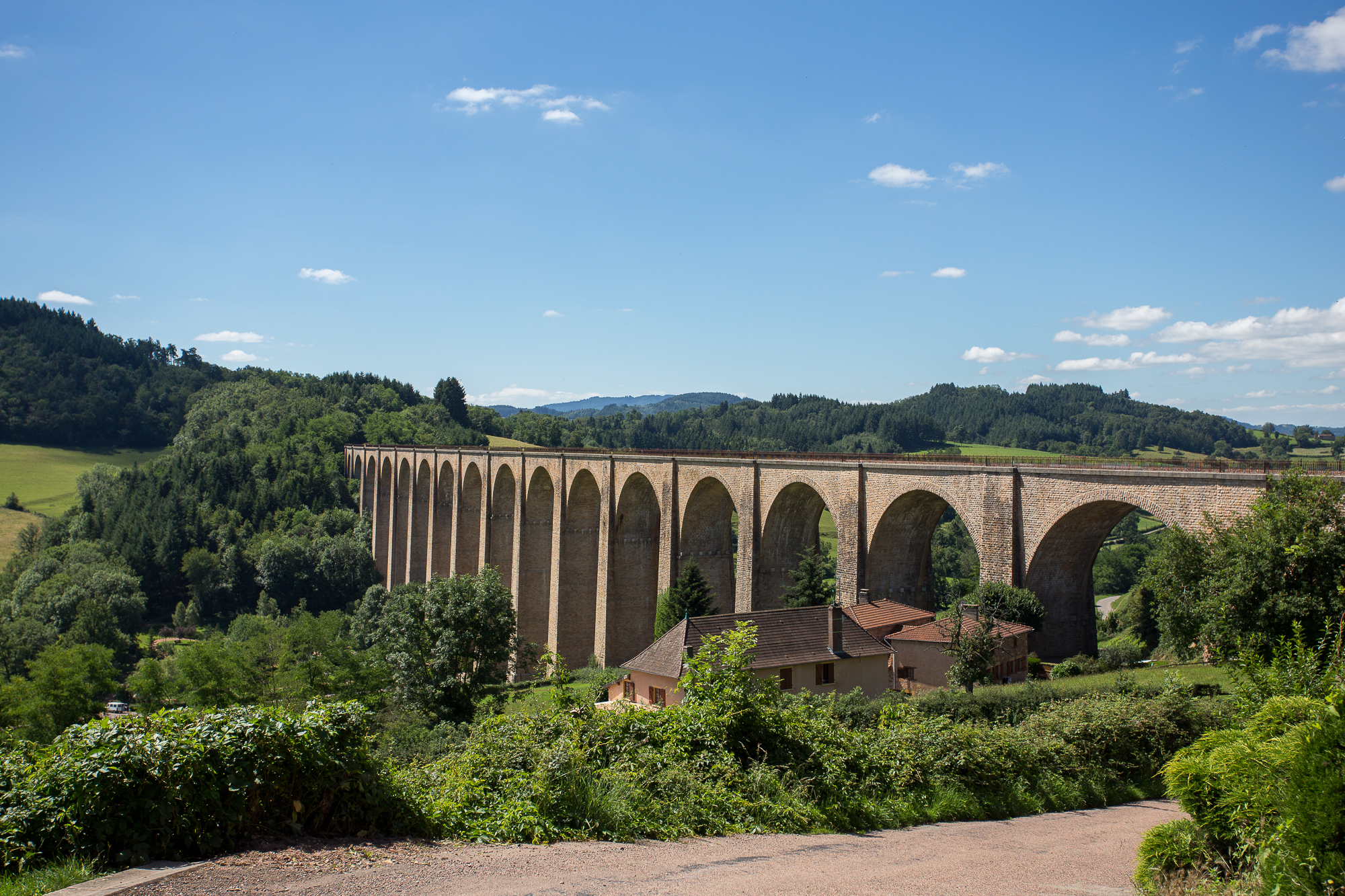
- The Mussy viaduct
- Location of Mussy-sous-Dun
- Location within France Location within Bourgogne-Franche-Comté
- Coordinates: 46°14′06″N 4°19′50″E
- Country: France
- Region: Bourgogne-Franche-Comté
- Department: Saône-et-Loire
- Arrondissement: Charolles
- Canton: Chauffailles

Government
  - Mayor (2022–2026): Jean-Pierre Bonin
- Area^{1}: 10 km^{2} (3.9 sq mi)
- Elevation: 410 m (1,350 ft)
- Highest elevation: 705 m (2,313 ft)
- Lowest elevation: 338 m (1,109 ft)
- Population (2023): 327
  - Density: 33/km^{2} (85/sq mi)
- Time zone: UTC+01:00 (CET)
  - Summer (DST): UTC+02:00 (CEST)
- INSEE/Postal code: 71327 /71170
- ^{1} French Land Register data, which excludes lakes, ponds, glaciers > 1 km^{2} (0.386 sq mi or 247 acres) and river estuaries.

Mussy-sous-Dun (French pronunciation: [mysi su dœ̃]) is a commune in the Saône-et-Loire department in the region of Bourgogne-Franche-Comté in eastern France.

== See also ==
- Communes of the Saône-et-Loire department
