= Tancon =

- Commune
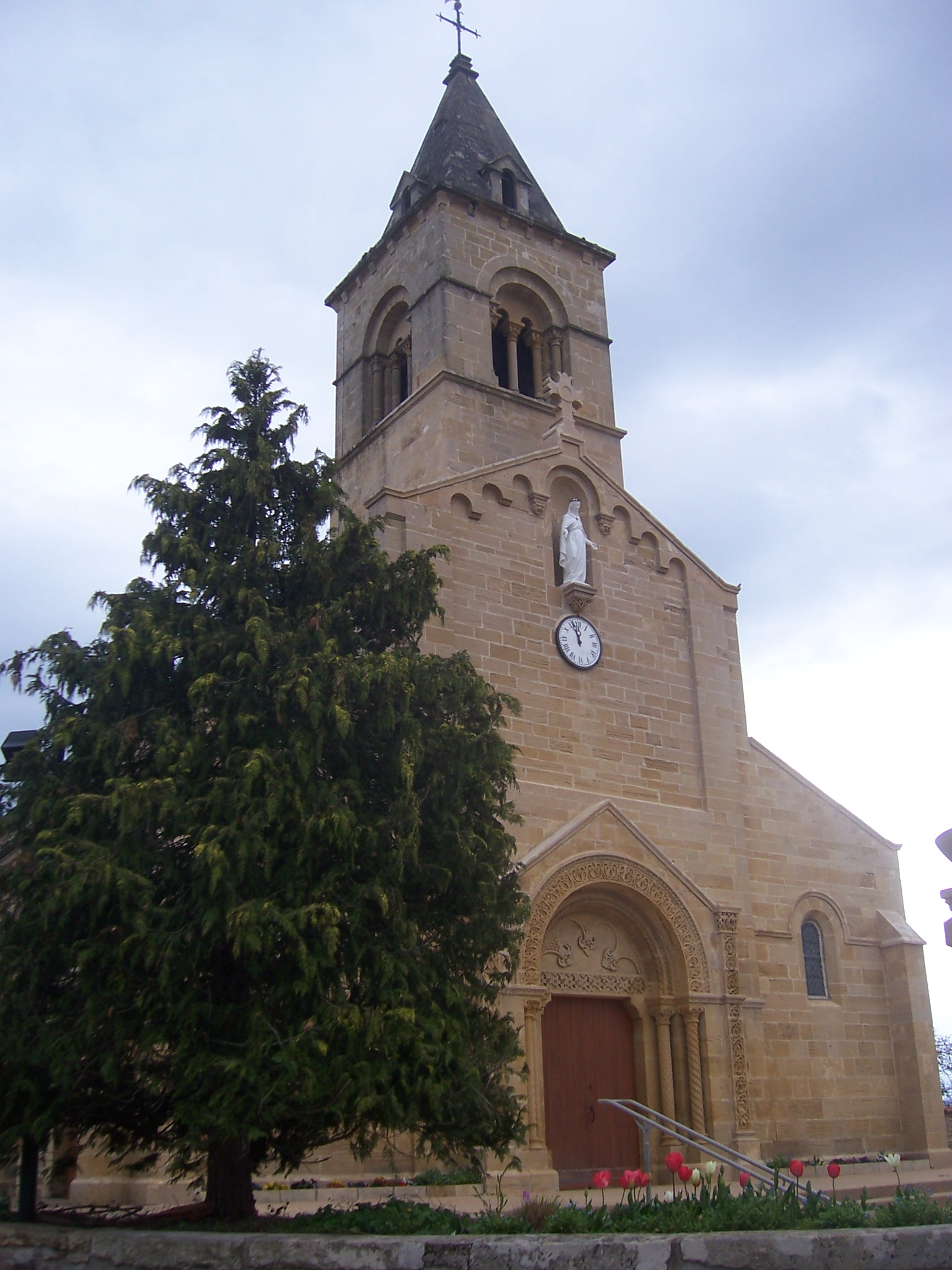
- The church in Tancon

- Coat of arms
- Location of Tancon
- Location within France Location within Bourgogne-Franche-Comté
- Coordinates: 46°12′11″N 4°15′52″E
- Country: France
- Region: Bourgogne-Franche-Comté
- Department: Saône-et-Loire
- Arrondissement: Charolles
- Canton: Chauffailles

Government
  - Mayor (2020–2026): Cyrille Brunet
- Area^{1}: 9.48 km^{2} (3.66 sq mi)
- Elevation: 400 m (1,300 ft)
- Highest elevation: 441 m (1,447 ft)
- Lowest elevation: 285 m (935 ft)
- Population (2023): 570
  - Density: 60/km^{2} (160/sq mi)
- Time zone: UTC+01:00 (CET)
  - Summer (DST): UTC+02:00 (CEST)
- INSEE/Postal code: 71533 /71740
- ^{1} French Land Register data, which excludes lakes, ponds, glaciers > 1 km^{2} (0.386 sq mi or 247 acres) and river estuaries.

Tancon (French pronunciation: [tɑ̃kɔ̃]) is a commune in the Saône-et-Loire department in the region of Bourgogne-Franche-Comté in eastern France.

== See also ==
- Communes of the Saône-et-Loire department
