= Sainte-Foy, Saône-et-Loire =

Sainte-Foy
- Commune
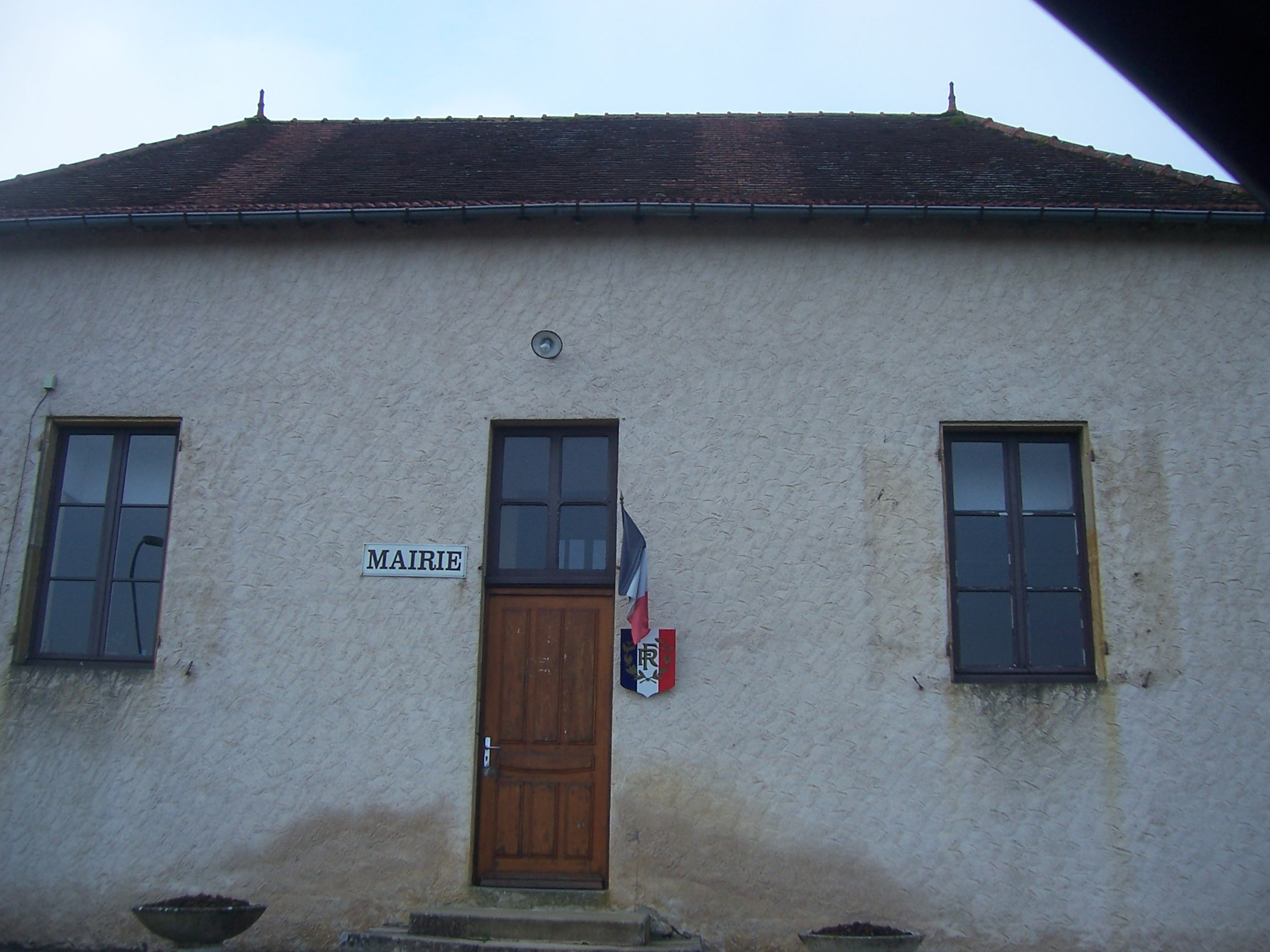
- Town hall
- Location of Sainte-Foy
- Location within France Location within Bourgogne-Franche-Comté
- Coordinates: 46°16′43″N 4°07′47″E
- Country: France
- Region: Bourgogne-Franche-Comté
- Department: Saône-et-Loire
- Arrondissement: Charolles
- Canton: Chauffailles
- Area^{1}: 8.3 km^{2} (3.2 sq mi)
- Elevation: 430 m (1,410 ft)
- Highest elevation: 549 m (1,801 ft)
- Lowest elevation: 339 m (1,112 ft)
- Population (2023): 144
  - Density: 17/km^{2} (45/sq mi)
- Time zone: UTC+01:00 (CET)
  - Summer (DST): UTC+02:00 (CEST)
- INSEE/Postal code: 71415 /71110
- ^{1} French Land Register data, which excludes lakes, ponds, glaciers > 1 km^{2} (0.386 sq mi or 247 acres) and river estuaries.

Sainte-Foy (French pronunciation: [sɛ̃t fwa]) is a commune in the Saône-et-Loire department in the region of Bourgogne-Franche-Comté in eastern France.

== See also ==
- Communes of the Saône-et-Loire department
