= La Chapelle-sous-Dun =

- Commune
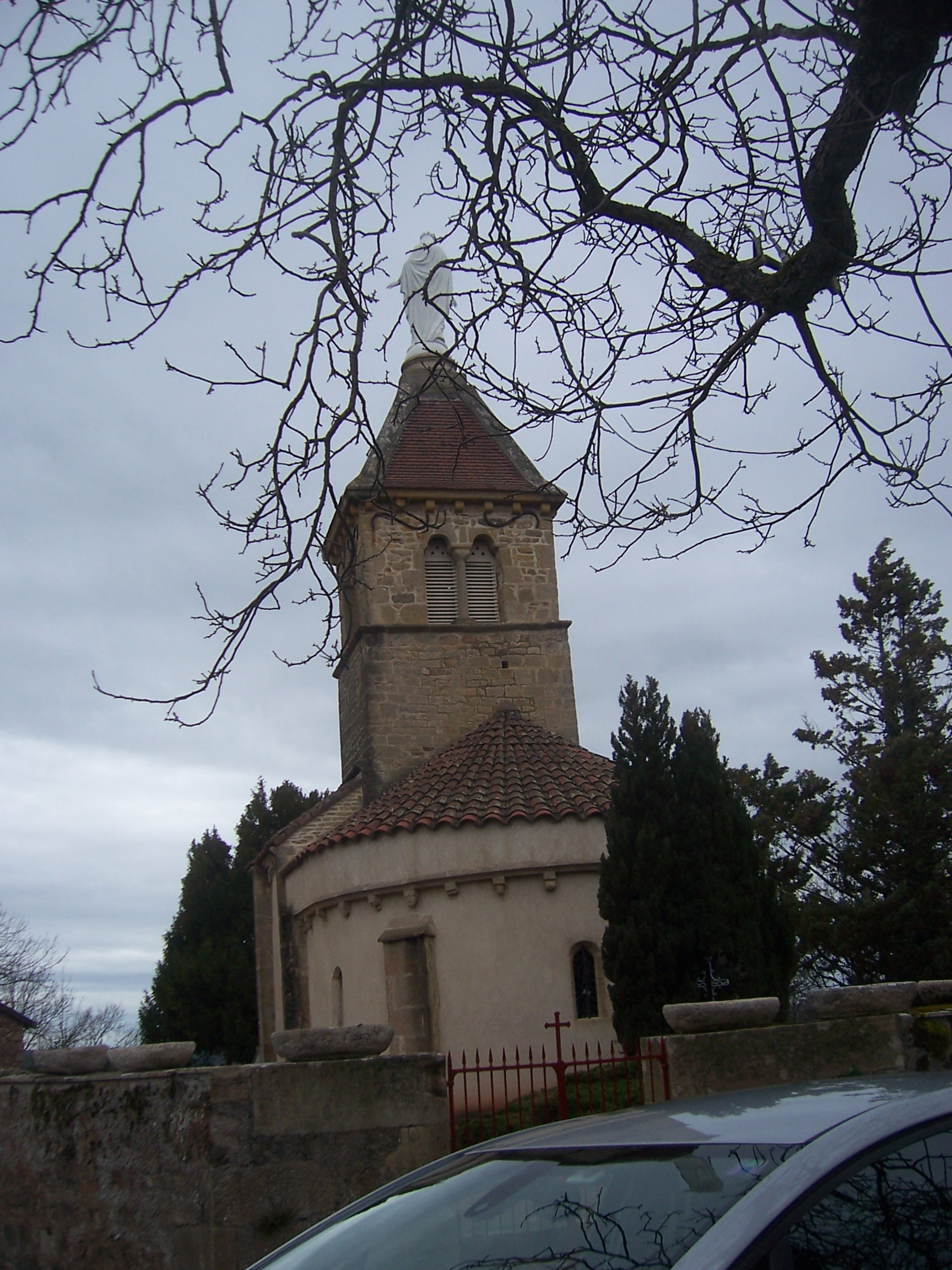
- The church in La Chapelle-sous-Dun
- Location of La Chapelle-sous-Dun
- Location within France Location within Bourgogne-Franche-Comté
- Coordinates: 46°15′39″N 4°17′38″E
- Country: France
- Region: Bourgogne-Franche-Comté
- Department: Saône-et-Loire
- Arrondissement: Charolles
- Canton: Chauffailles
- Area^{1}: 8.51 km^{2} (3.29 sq mi)
- Elevation: 350 m (1,150 ft)
- Highest elevation: 553 m (1,814 ft)
- Lowest elevation: 317 m (1,040 ft)
- Population (2023): 419
  - Density: 49.2/km^{2} (128/sq mi)
- Time zone: UTC+01:00 (CET)
  - Summer (DST): UTC+02:00 (CEST)
- INSEE/Postal code: 71095 /71800
- ^{1} French Land Register data, which excludes lakes, ponds, glaciers > 1 km^{2} (0.386 sq mi or 247 acres) and river estuaries.

La Chapelle-sous-Dun (French pronunciation: [la ʃapɛl su dœ̃]) is a commune in the Saône-et-Loire department in the region of Bourgogne-Franche-Comté in eastern France.

== See also ==
- Communes of the Saône-et-Loire department
