= Saint-Laurent-en-Brionnais =

- Commune
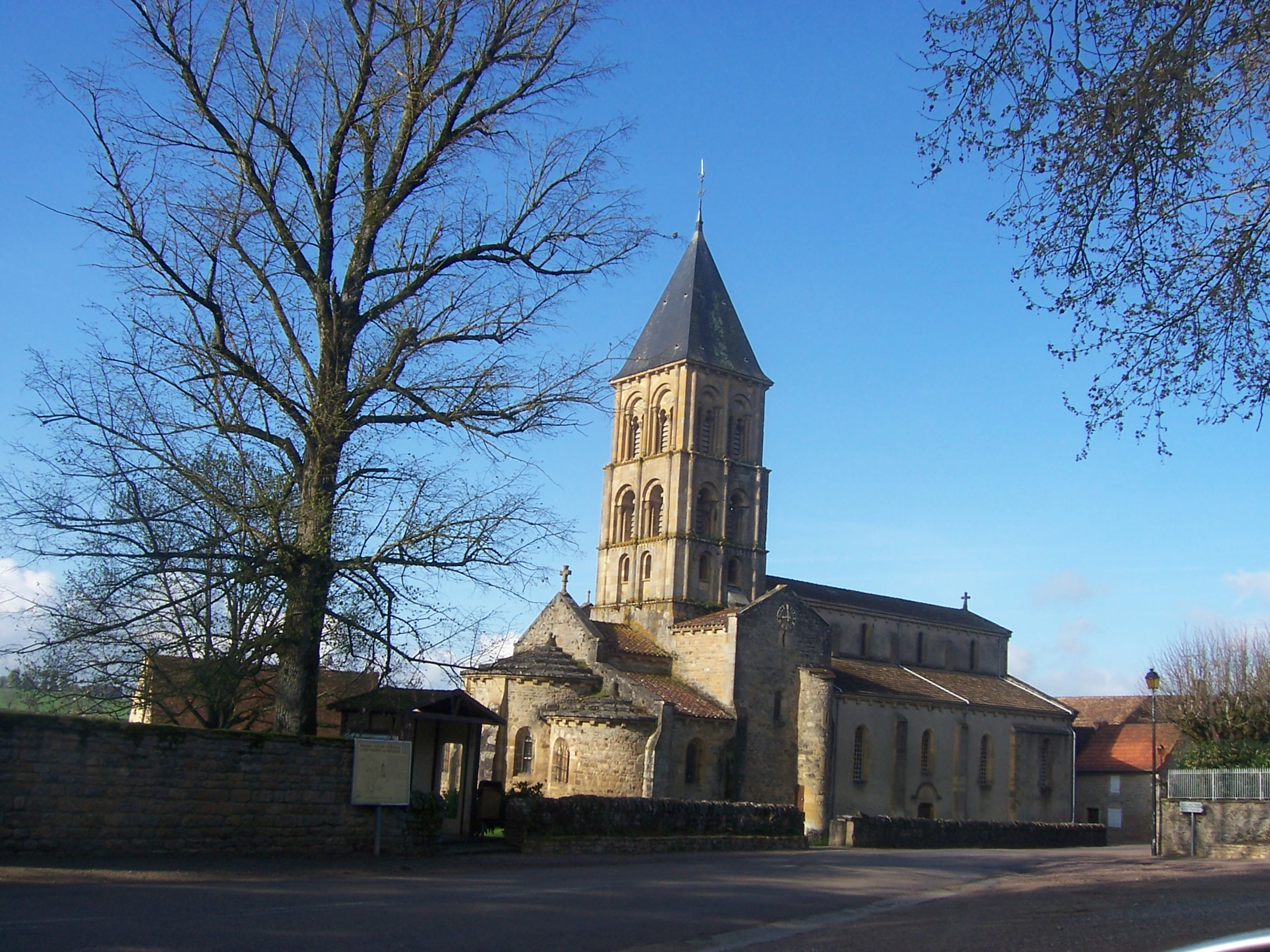
- The church in Saint-Laurent-en-Brionnais
- Location of Saint-Laurent-en-Brionnais
- Location within France Location within Bourgogne-Franche-Comté
- Coordinates: 46°16′29″N 4°15′33″E
- Country: France
- Region: Bourgogne-Franche-Comté
- Department: Saône-et-Loire
- Arrondissement: Charolles
- Canton: Chauffailles

Government
  - Mayor (2020–2026): Bernard Augagneur
- Area^{1}: 12.98 km^{2} (5.01 sq mi)
- Elevation: 300 m (980 ft)
- Highest elevation: 487 m (1,598 ft)
- Lowest elevation: 309 m (1,014 ft)
- Population (2023): 324
  - Density: 25.0/km^{2} (64.6/sq mi)
- Time zone: UTC+01:00 (CET)
  - Summer (DST): UTC+02:00 (CEST)
- INSEE/Postal code: 71437 /71800
- ^{1} French Land Register data, which excludes lakes, ponds, glaciers > 1 km^{2} (0.386 sq mi or 247 acres) and river estuaries.

Saint-Laurent-en-Brionnais (French pronunciation: [sɛ̃ loʁɑ̃ ɑ̃ bʁijɔnɛ]) is a commune in the Saône-et-Loire department in the region of Bourgogne-Franche-Comté in eastern France.

== See also ==
- Communes of the Saône-et-Loire department
