= Iguerande =

- Commune
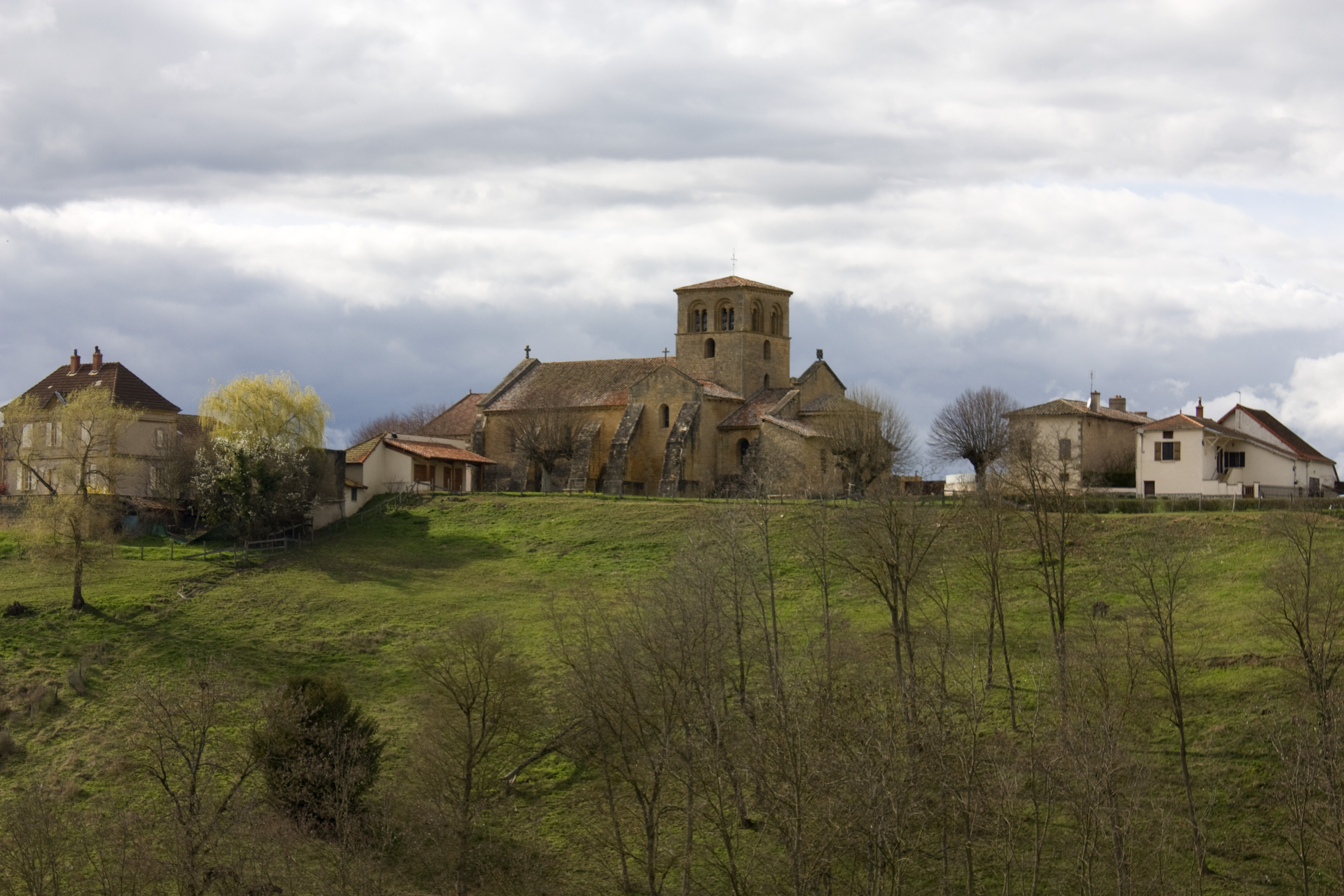
- The church in Iguerande
- Location of Iguerande
- Location within France Location within Bourgogne-Franche-Comté
- Coordinates: 46°12′22″N 4°04′46″E
- Country: France
- Region: Bourgogne-Franche-Comté
- Department: Saône-et-Loire
- Arrondissement: Charolles
- Canton: Chauffailles
- Area^{1}: 21.43 km^{2} (8.27 sq mi)
- Elevation: 300 m (980 ft)
- Highest elevation: 425 m (1,394 ft)
- Lowest elevation: 245 m (804 ft)
- Population (2023): 992
  - Density: 46.3/km^{2} (120/sq mi)
- Time zone: UTC+01:00 (CET)
  - Summer (DST): UTC+02:00 (CEST)
- INSEE/Postal code: 71238 /71340
- ^{1} French Land Register data, which excludes lakes, ponds, glaciers > 1 km^{2} (0.386 sq mi or 247 acres) and river estuaries.

Iguerande (French pronunciation: [iɡʁɑ̃d]) is a commune in the Saône-et-Loire department in the region of Bourgogne-Franche-Comté in eastern France.

== See also ==
- Communes of the Saône-et-Loire department

== Gallery ==
Parish church Saint Marcel

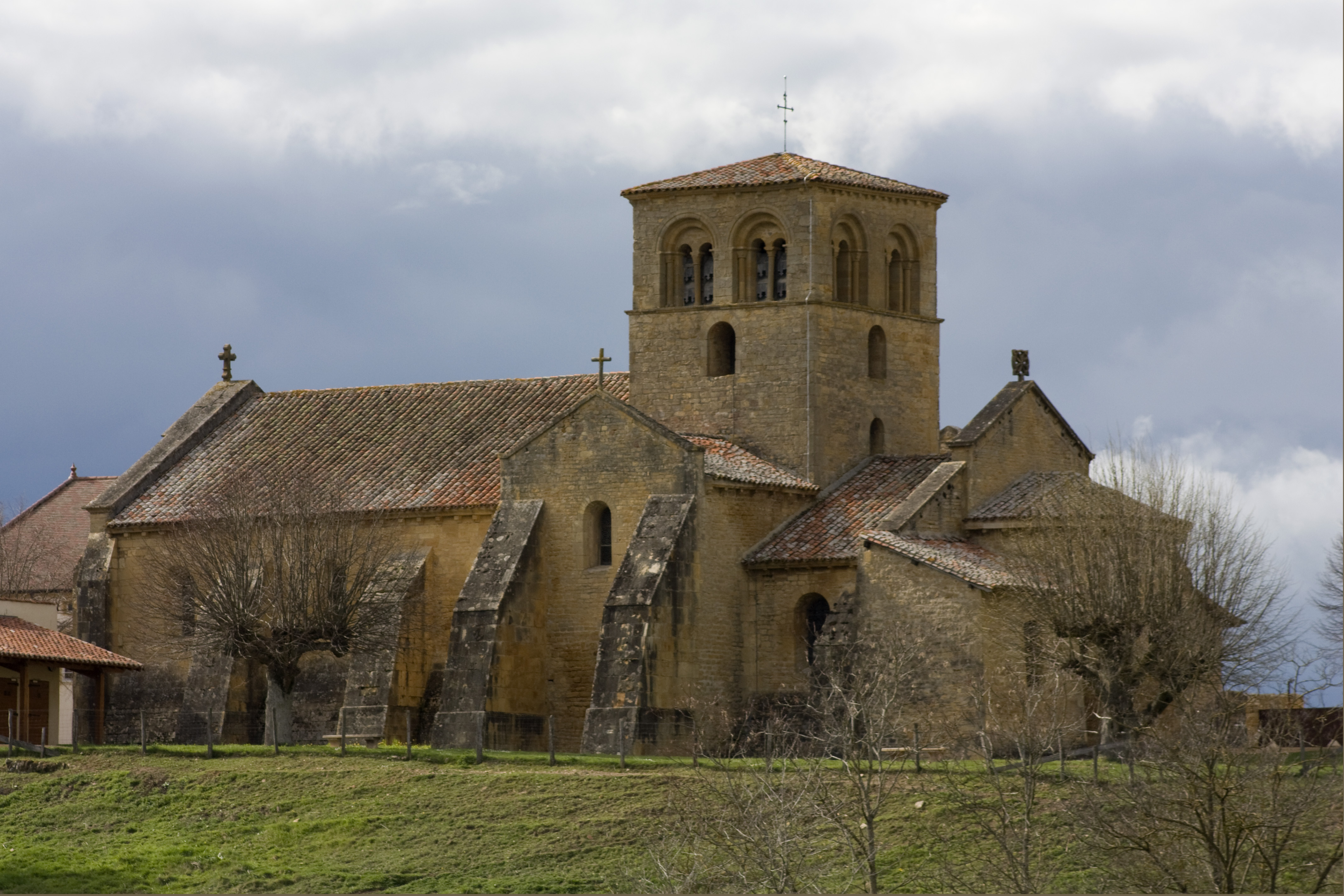
St Marcel's church.

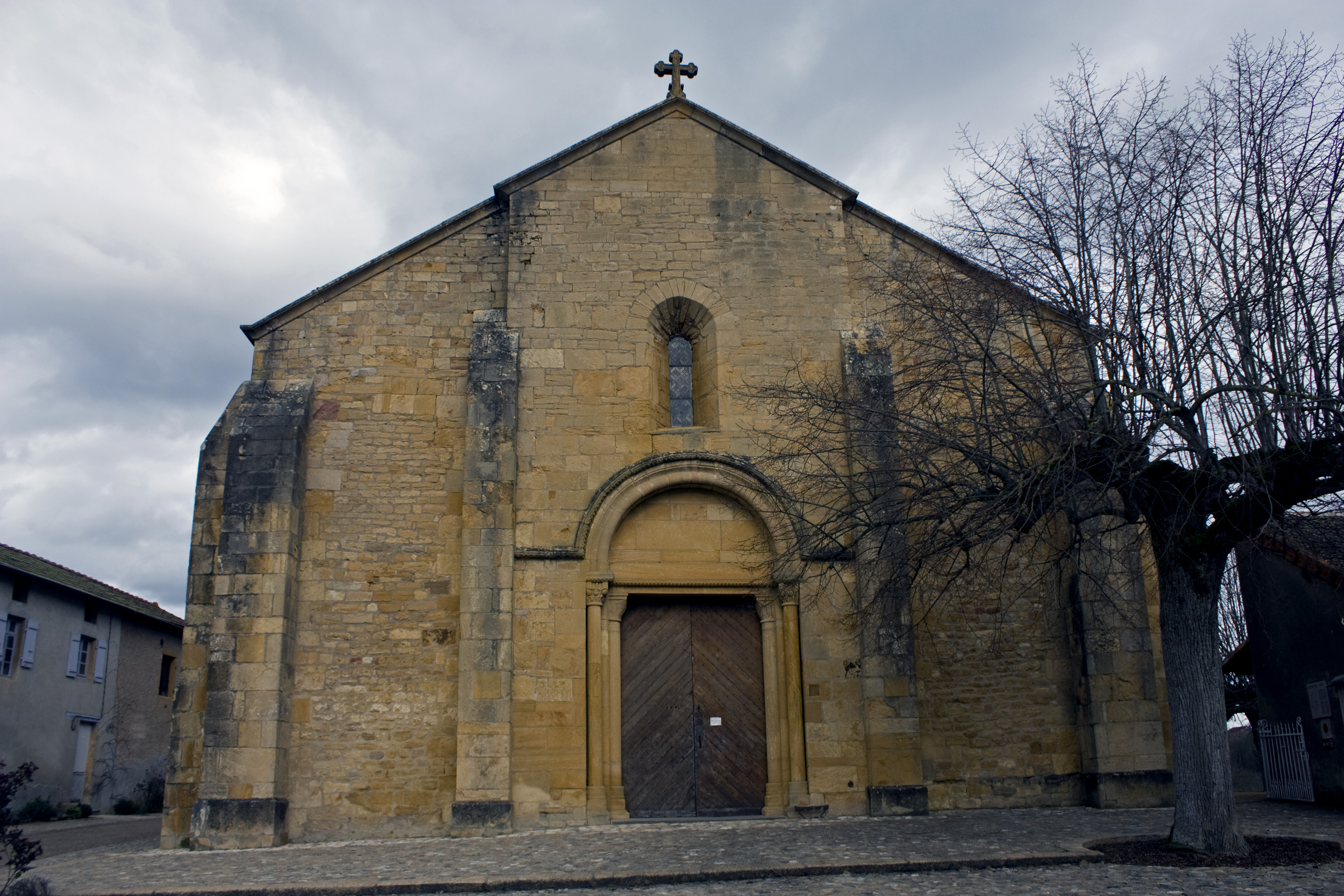
Forecourt view.

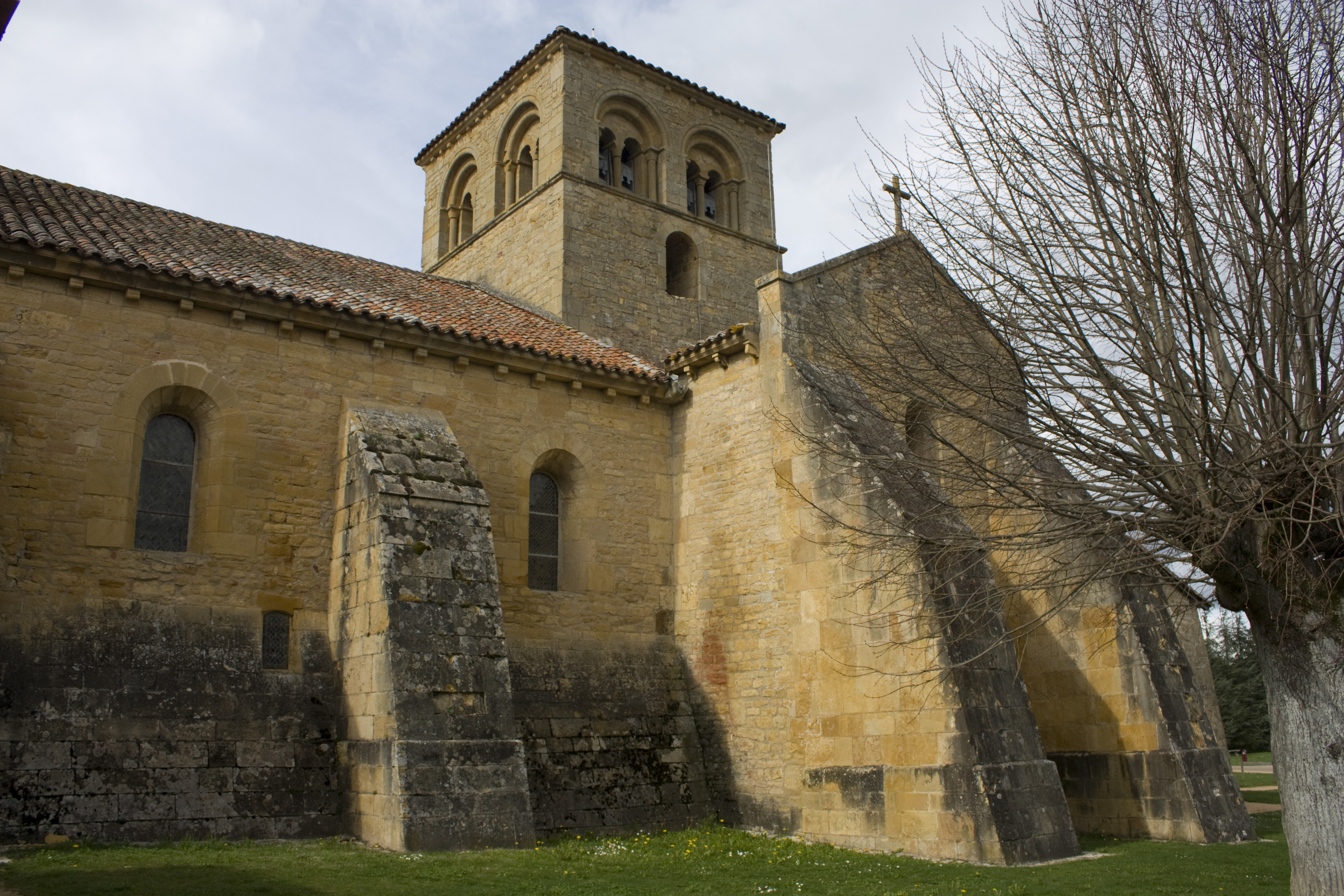
Buttress.

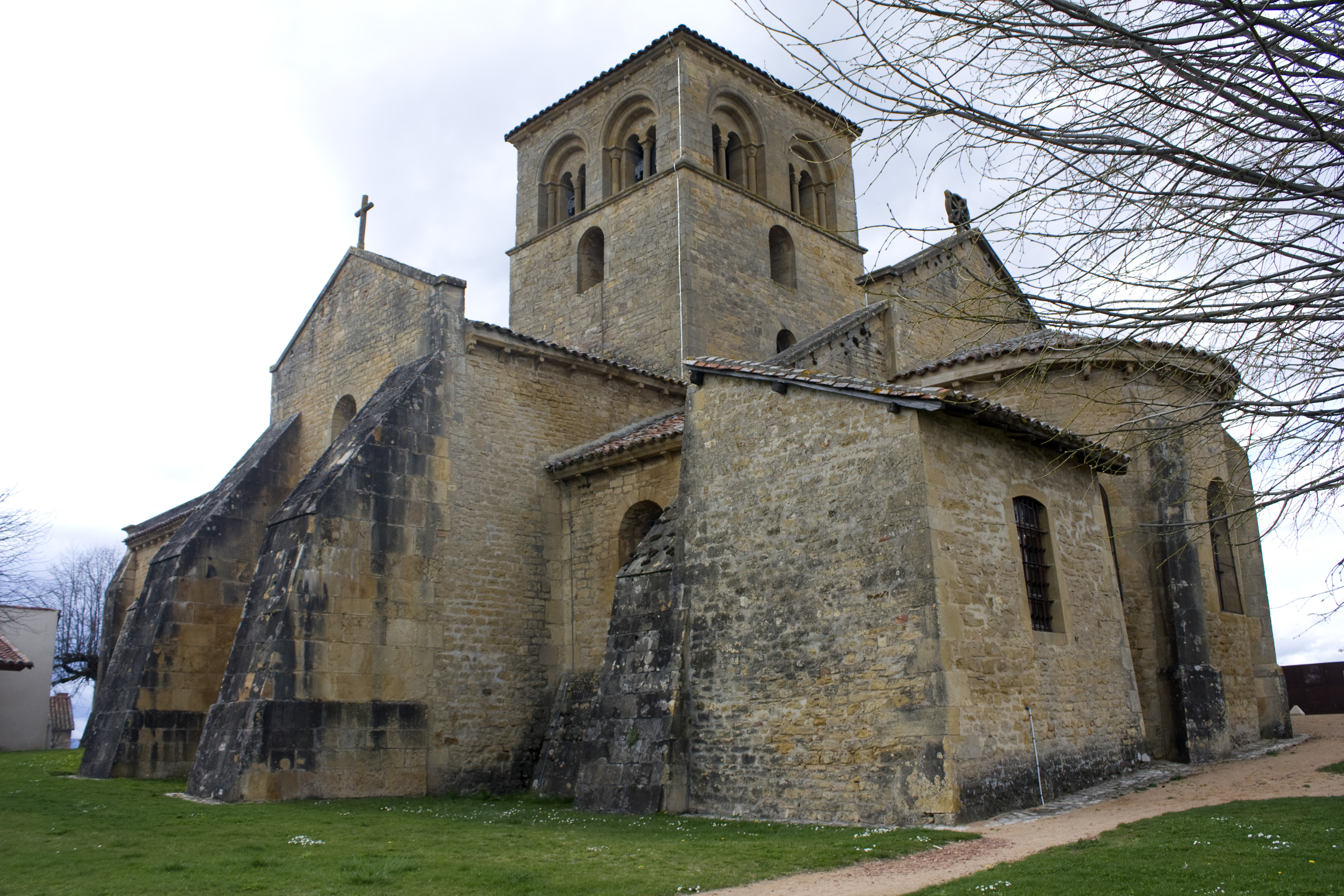
Bell tower.

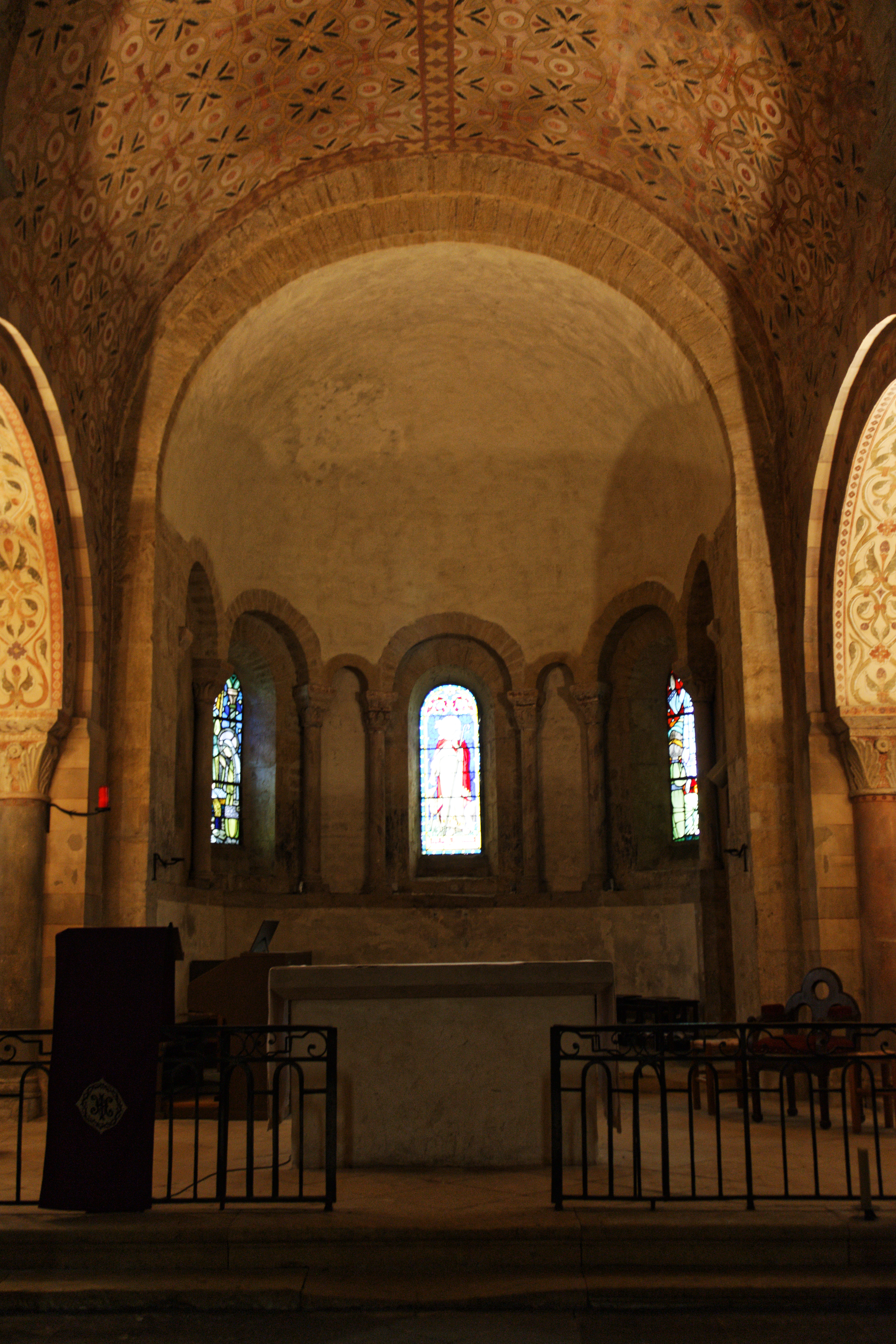
Oven bottom apse.

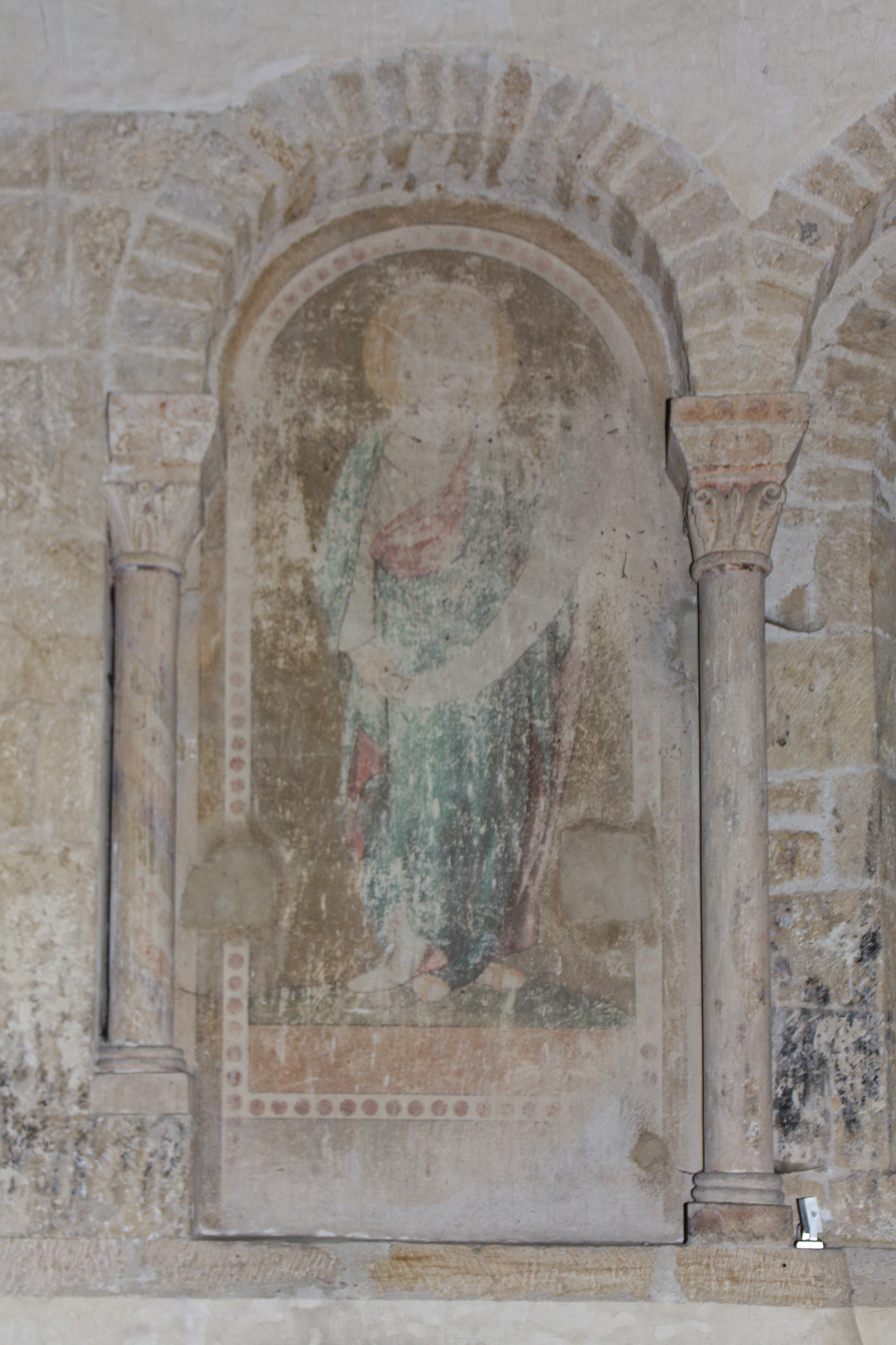
Saint with phylactery.

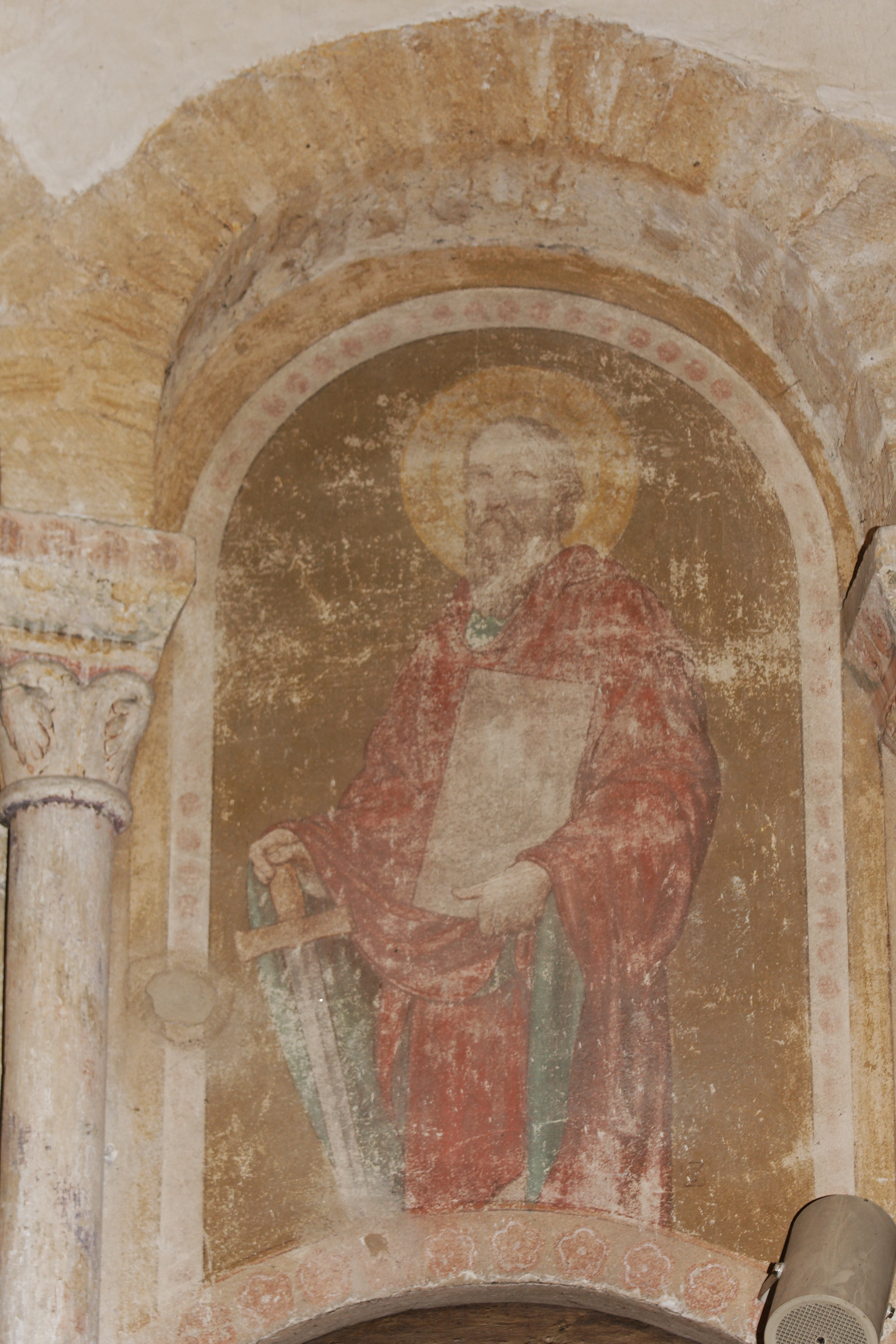
Saint Paul.
