= Coublanc, Saône-et-Loire =

Coublanc
- Commune
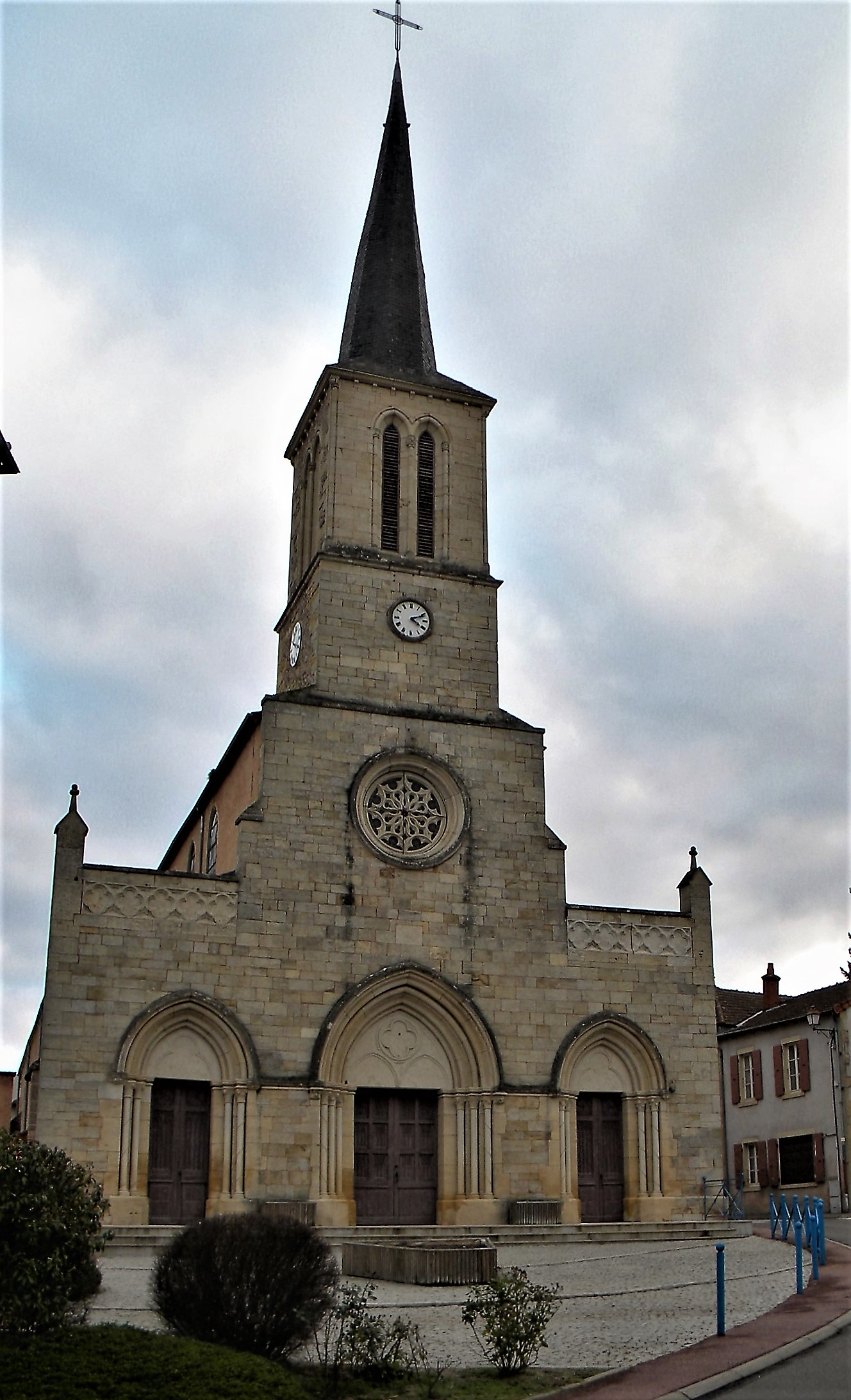
- The church in Coublanc

- Coat of arms
- Location of Coublanc
- Location within France Location within Bourgogne-Franche-Comté
- Coordinates: 46°10′29″N 4°16′25″E
- Country: France
- Region: Bourgogne-Franche-Comté
- Department: Saône-et-Loire
- Arrondissement: Charolles
- Canton: Chauffailles

Government
  - Mayor (2020–2026): Nicolas Crasnier
- Area^{1}: 8.76 km^{2} (3.38 sq mi)
- Elevation: 424 m (1,391 ft)
- Highest elevation: 570 m (1,870 ft)
- Lowest elevation: 330 m (1,080 ft)
- Population (2023): 838
  - Density: 95.7/km^{2} (248/sq mi)
- Time zone: UTC+01:00 (CET)
  - Summer (DST): UTC+02:00 (CEST)
- INSEE/Postal code: 71148 /71170
- ^{1} French Land Register data, which excludes lakes, ponds, glaciers > 1 km^{2} (0.386 sq mi or 247 acres) and river estuaries.

Coublanc (French pronunciation: [kublɑ̃]) is a commune in the Saône-et-Loire department in the region of Bourgogne-Franche-Comté in eastern France.

== See also ==
- Communes of the Saône-et-Loire department
