= Châteauneuf, Saône-et-Loire =

Châteauneuf
- Commune
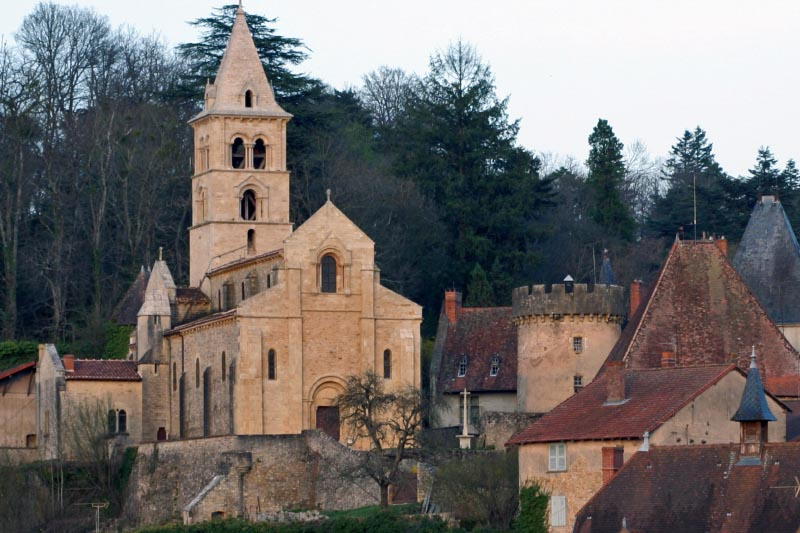
- The church in Châteauneuf
- Location of Châteauneuf
- Location within France Location within Bourgogne-Franche-Comté
- Coordinates: 46°12′48″N 4°15′20″E
- Country: France
- Region: Bourgogne-Franche-Comté
- Department: Saône-et-Loire
- Arrondissement: Charolles
- Canton: Chauffailles
- Area^{1}: 1.34 km^{2} (0.52 sq mi)
- Elevation: 293 m (961 ft)
- Highest elevation: 400 m (1,300 ft)
- Lowest elevation: 286 m (938 ft)
- Population (2023): 88
  - Density: 66/km^{2} (170/sq mi)
- Time zone: UTC+01:00 (CET)
  - Summer (DST): UTC+02:00 (CEST)
- INSEE/Postal code: 71113 /71740
- ^{1} French Land Register data, which excludes lakes, ponds, glaciers > 1 km^{2} (0.386 sq mi or 247 acres) and river estuaries.

Châteauneuf (French pronunciation: [ʃɑtonœf]; literally "Newcastle") is a commune in the Saône-et-Loire department in the region of Bourgogne-Franche-Comté in eastern France.

== See also ==
- Communes of the Saône-et-Loire department
