= Departmental Council of Jura =

Departmental legislature in France

Departmental Council of Jura Conseil départemental du Jura

Leadership
- President: Gérôme Fassenet, LR since 13 May 2024

Structure
- Seats: 34
- Political groups: Government (28): DVD (17); LR (11); Opposition (6): RE (4); DVG (1); PS (1); www.jura.fr

The Departmental Council of Jura (French: Conseil Départemental du Jura) is the deliberative assembly of the Jura department in the region of Bourgogne-Franche-Comté. It consists of 34 members (general councilors) from 17 cantons and its headquarters are in Lons-le-Saunier.

The president of the general council Gérôme Fassenet.

== See also ==
- Jura (department)
- General councils of France
