= Artaius =

Celtic epithet of Mercury

Artaius is a Celtic epithet applied to the Roman god Mercury during the Romano-Celtic period. It is known from a single inscription from Beaucroissant in the Isère:

MERCVRIO
AVG ARTAIO
SACR
SEX GEMINIVS
CVPITVS
EX VOTO

"To the august Mercury Artaius, Sextus Geminius Cupitus (has dedicated this) sacred (stone) in fulfillment of a vow."

In Gaulish, the word artos means ‘bear’, and artaios would have been a derivative (meaning something like ‘ursine’). Miranda Green considers Mercury Artaius to have been a bear-god. It is also possible that Artaius is derived from a place name (so that, as an "Artaian Mercury", he would only indirectly have any association with bears). Based on the inscription found at Beaucroissant, Auguste Longnon surmised that the location was once called Artay; there is a similarly named town, Artaix, in Saône-et-Loire.
