= Baugy =

Baugy may refer to the following places in France:

- Baugy, Cher, a commune in the department of Cher
- Baugy, Oise, a commune in the department of Oise
- Baugy, Saône-et-Loire, a commune in the department of Saône-et-Loire
