= Chenay =

Chenay may refer to the following places in France:

- Chenay, Marne, a commune in the Marne department
- Chenay, Sarthe, a commune in the Sarthe department
- Chenay, Deux-Sèvres, a commune in the Deux-Sèvres department
- Chenay-le-Châtel, a commune in the Saône-et-Loire department
