= Vitry-en-Charollais =

- Commune
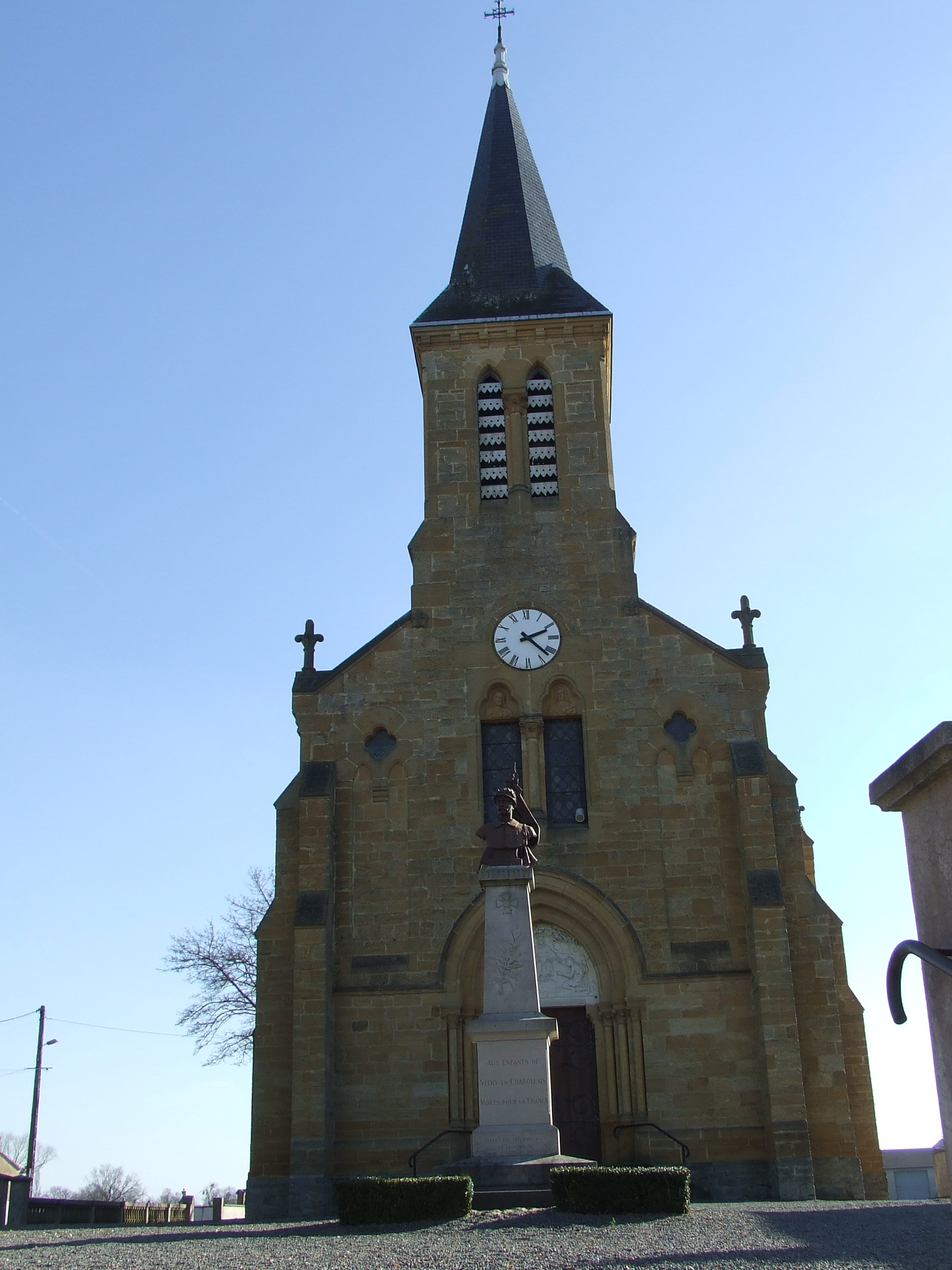
- The church in Vitry-en-Charollais
- Location of Vitry-en-Charollais
- Location within France Location within Bourgogne-Franche-Comté
- Coordinates: 46°27′19″N 4°03′32″E
- Country: France
- Region: Bourgogne-Franche-Comté
- Department: Saône-et-Loire
- Arrondissement: Charolles
- Canton: Paray-le-Monial
- Intercommunality: Le Grand Charolais

Government
  - Mayor (2020–2026): Daniel Therville
- Area^{1}: 21.24 km^{2} (8.20 sq mi)
- Elevation: 260 m (850 ft)
- Highest elevation: 277 m (909 ft)
- Lowest elevation: 229 m (751 ft)
- Population (2023): 1,082
  - Density: 50.94/km^{2} (131.9/sq mi)
- Time zone: UTC+01:00 (CET)
  - Summer (DST): UTC+02:00 (CEST)
- INSEE/Postal code: 71588 /71600
- ^{1} French Land Register data, which excludes lakes, ponds, glaciers > 1 km^{2} (0.386 sq mi or 247 acres) and river estuaries.

Vitry-en-Charollais (French pronunciation: [vitʁi ɑ̃ ʃaʁɔlɛ]) is a commune in the Saône-et-Loire department in the region of Bourgogne-Franche-Comté in eastern France.

== Geography ==
The Bourbince forms the commune's northeastern and northern borders.

== See also ==
- Communes of the Saône-et-Loire department
