= Poisson, Saône-et-Loire =

Poisson
- Commune
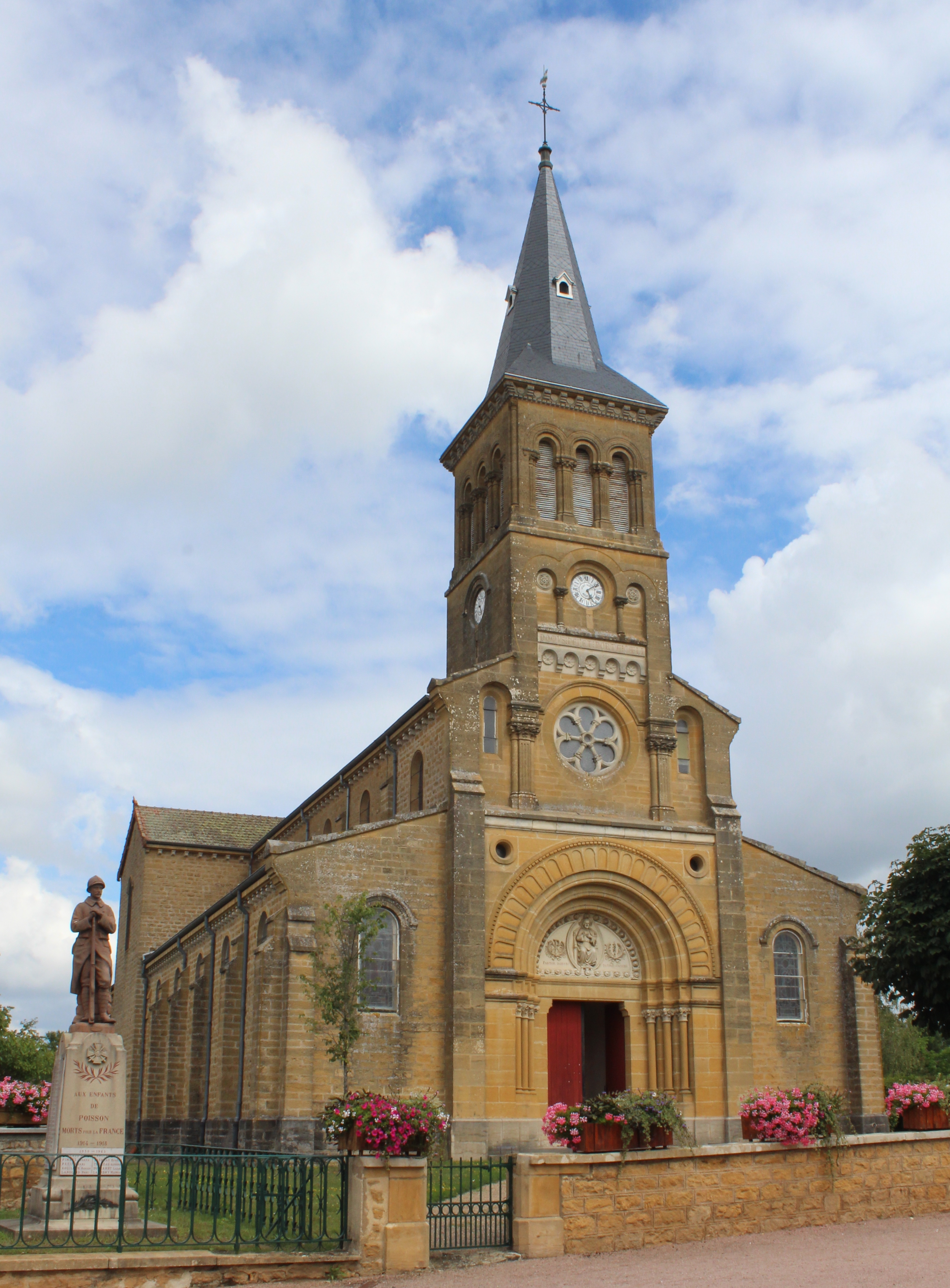
- The church in Poisson
- Location of Poisson
- Location within France Location within Bourgogne-Franche-Comté
- Coordinates: 46°23′10″N 4°07′46″E
- Country: France
- Region: Bourgogne-Franche-Comté
- Department: Saône-et-Loire
- Arrondissement: Charolles
- Canton: Paray-le-Monial
- Area^{1}: 35.48 km^{2} (13.70 sq mi)
- Elevation: 310 m (1,020 ft)
- Highest elevation: 366 m (1,201 ft)
- Lowest elevation: 250 m (820 ft)
- Population (2023): 551
  - Density: 15.5/km^{2} (40.2/sq mi)
- Time zone: UTC+01:00 (CET)
  - Summer (DST): UTC+02:00 (CEST)
- INSEE/Postal code: 71354 /71600
- ^{1} French Land Register data, which excludes lakes, ponds, glaciers > 1 km^{2} (0.386 sq mi or 247 acres) and river estuaries.

Poisson (French pronunciation: [pwasɔ̃]) is a commune in the Saône-et-Loire department in the region of Bourgogne-Franche-Comté in eastern France.

== Geography ==
The Arconce flows southwestward through the south-eastern part of the commune and forms part of its southern border.

== See also ==
- Communes of the Saône-et-Loire department
