= Canton of Paray-le-Monial =

Canton of France

Coordinates: 46.45°N 4.12°E

The canton of Paray-le-Monial is an administrative division of the Saône-et-Loire department, eastern France. Its borders were modified at the French canton reorganisation which came into effect in March 2015. Its seat is in Paray-le-Monial.

It consists of the following communes:

1. Anzy-le-Duc
2. Artaix
3. Baugy
4. Bourg-le-Comte
5. Céron
6. Chambilly
7. Chenay-le-Châtel
8. Hautefond
9. L'Hôpital-le-Mercier
10. Marcigny
11. Melay
12. Montceaux-l'Étoile
13. Nochize
14. Paray-le-Monial
15. Poisson
16. Saint-Léger-lès-Paray
17. Saint-Martin-du-Lac
18. Saint-Yan
19. Versaugues
20. Vindecy
21. Vitry-en-Charollais
22. Volesvres
