= Arconce =

River in central France

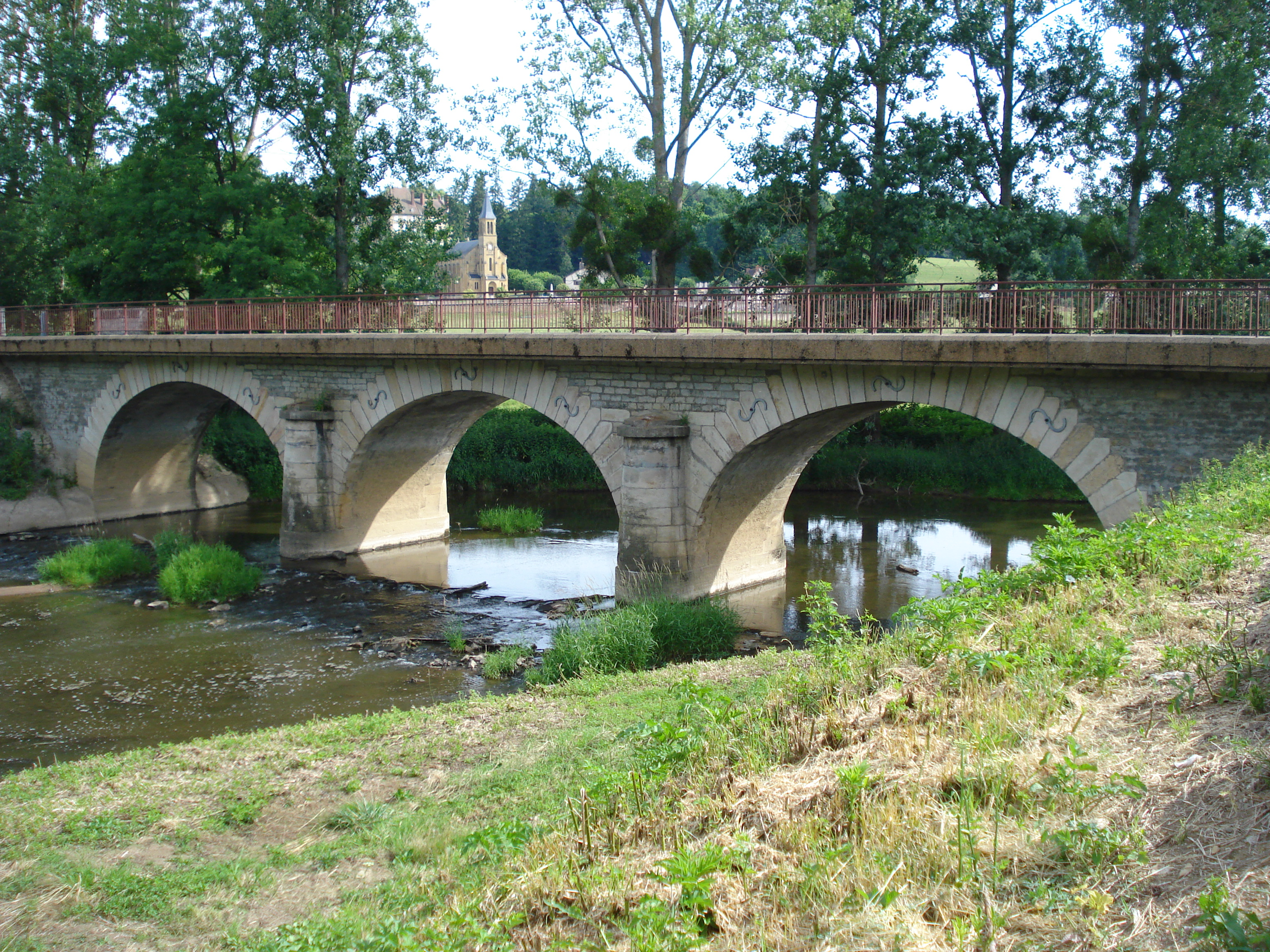

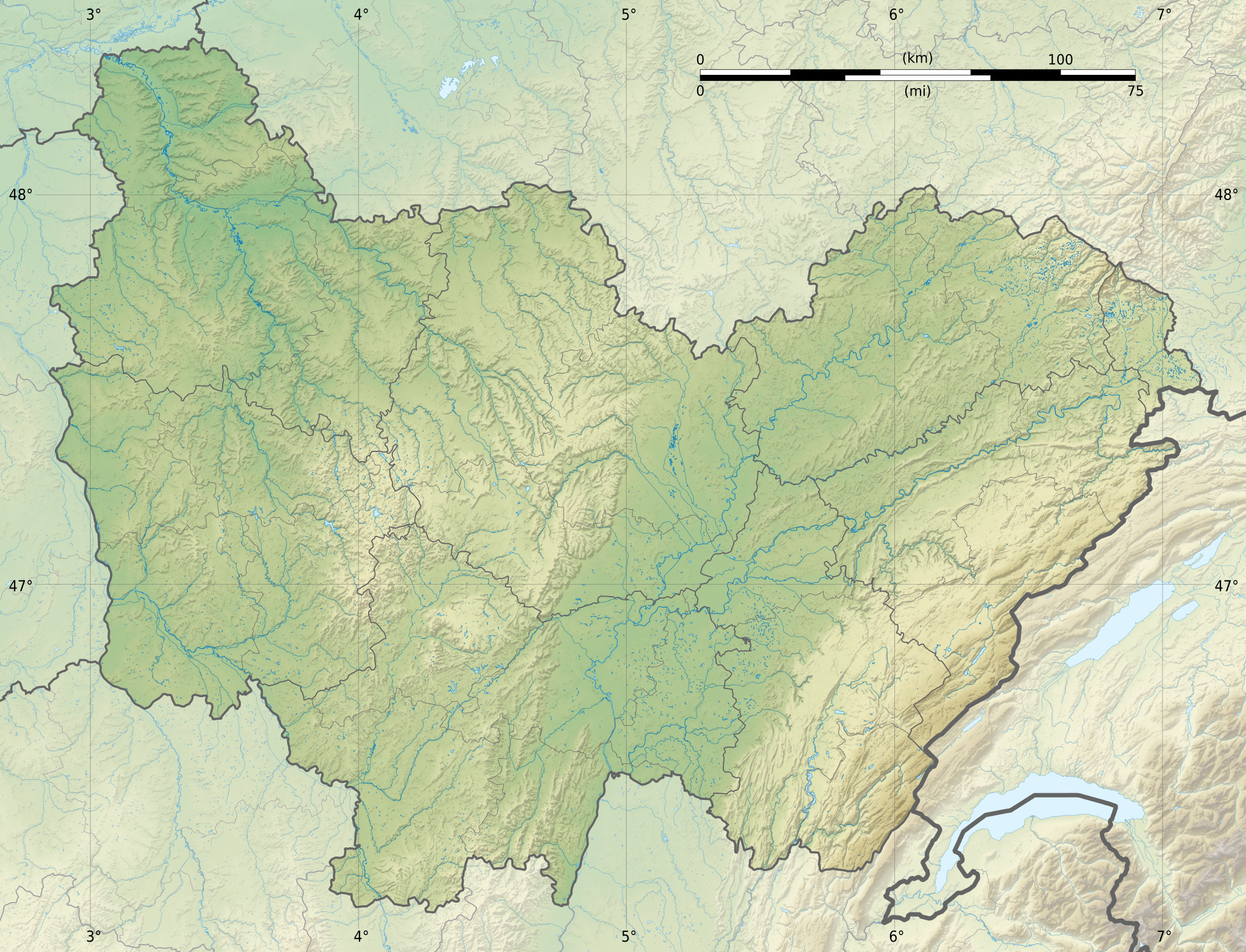
- Location within France Location within Bourgogne-Franche-Comté

Location
- Country: France

Physical characteristics
- Source
  - location: in Mary
  - coordinates: 46°36′33″N 04°28′20″E
  - elevation: 460 m (1,510 ft)
- Mouth
  - location: Loire
  - coordinates: 46°26′39″N 04°00′17″E
  - elevation: 229 m (751 ft)
- Length: 98.8 km (61.4 mi)
- Basin size: 599 km^{2} (231 sq mi)
- Discharge
  - average: 5.65 m^{3}/s (200 cu ft/s)

Basin features
- Progression: Loire→ Atlantic Ocean

The Arconce (French pronunciation: [aʁkɔ̃s]) is a 98.8 km (61.4 mi) long river in the Saône-et-Loire department in central France. Its source is in Mary, 2 km (1.2 mi) southwest of the village. It is a right tributary of the Loire, into which it flows at Varenne-Saint-Germain, 2.5 km (1.6 mi) northwest of the village.

It flows generally southwest, but north from Anzy-le-Duc to its mouth, with numerous meanders.

== Communes along its course ==
The following communes are ordered from source to mouth : Mary, Gourdon, Le Rousset, Marizy, Ballore, Mornay, Martigny-le-Comte, Viry, Charolles, Changy, Lugny-lès-Charolles, Saint-Julien-de-Civry, Nochize, Poisson, Varenne-l'Arconce, Saint-Didier-en-Brionnais, Sarry, Anzy-le-Duc, Montceaux-l'Étoile, Versaugues, L'Hôpital-le-Mercier, Saint-Yan, Varenne-Saint-Germain
