= Sarry, Saône-et-Loire =

Sarry
- Commune
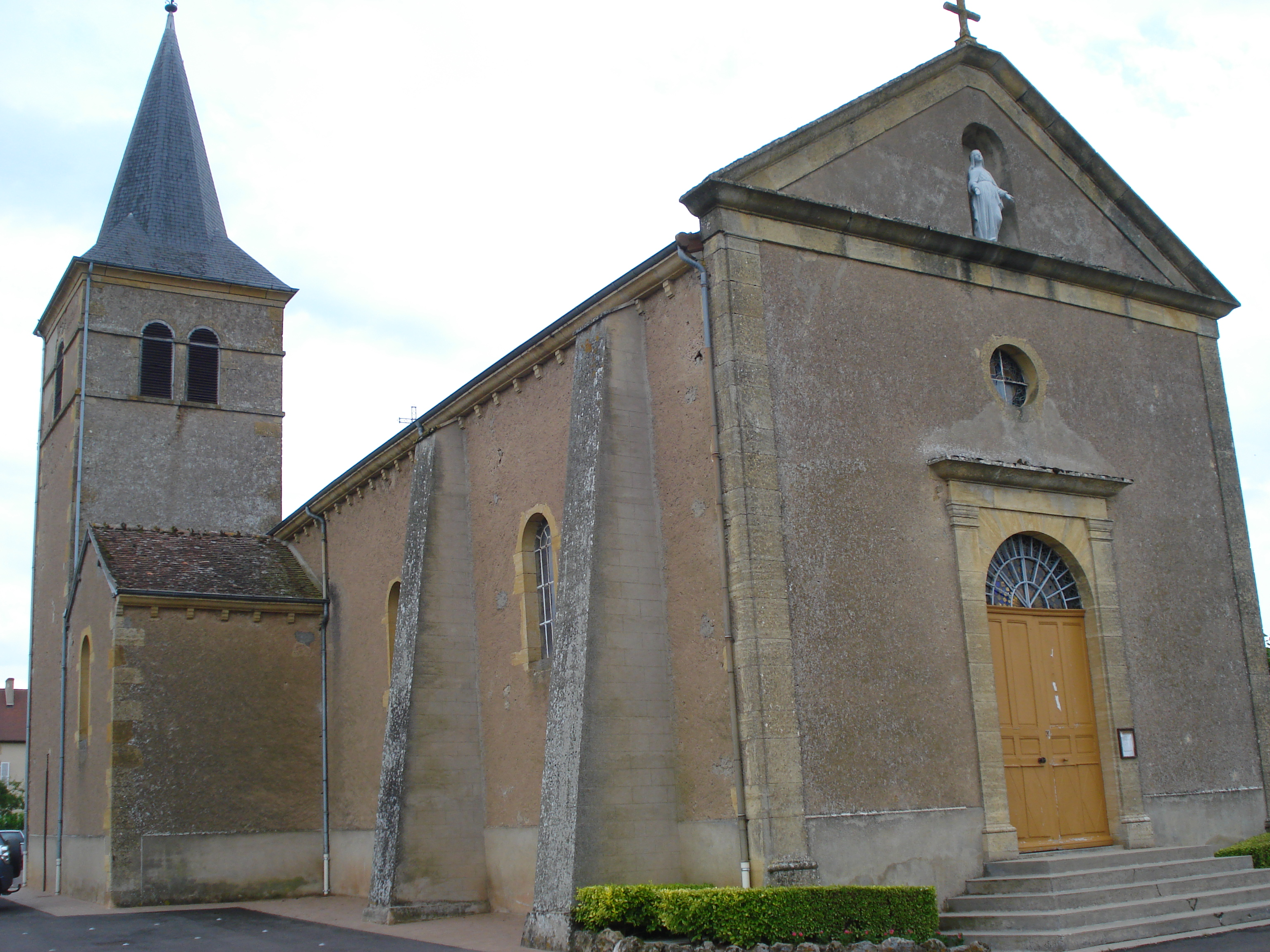
- The church in Sarry
- Location of Sarry
- Location within France Location within Bourgogne-Franche-Comté
- Coordinates: 46°18′41″N 4°07′00″E
- Country: France
- Region: Bourgogne-Franche-Comté
- Department: Saône-et-Loire
- Arrondissement: Charolles
- Canton: Chauffailles
- Area^{1}: 9.67 km^{2} (3.73 sq mi)
- Elevation: 300 m (980 ft)
- Highest elevation: 420 m (1,380 ft)
- Lowest elevation: 254 m (833 ft)
- Population (2023): 103
  - Density: 10.7/km^{2} (27.6/sq mi)
- Time zone: UTC+01:00 (CET)
  - Summer (DST): UTC+02:00 (CEST)
- INSEE/Postal code: 71500 /71110
- ^{1} French Land Register data, which excludes lakes, ponds, glaciers > 1 km^{2} (0.386 sq mi or 247 acres) and river estuaries.

Sarry (French pronunciation: [saʁi]) is a commune in the Saône-et-Loire department in the region of Bourgogne-Franche-Comté in eastern France.

== Geography ==
The Arconce forms part of the commune's northwestern border. The village lies on the left bank of the Belaine, a tributary of the Arconce.

== See also ==
- Communes of the Saône-et-Loire department
