= Pouilloux =

- Commune
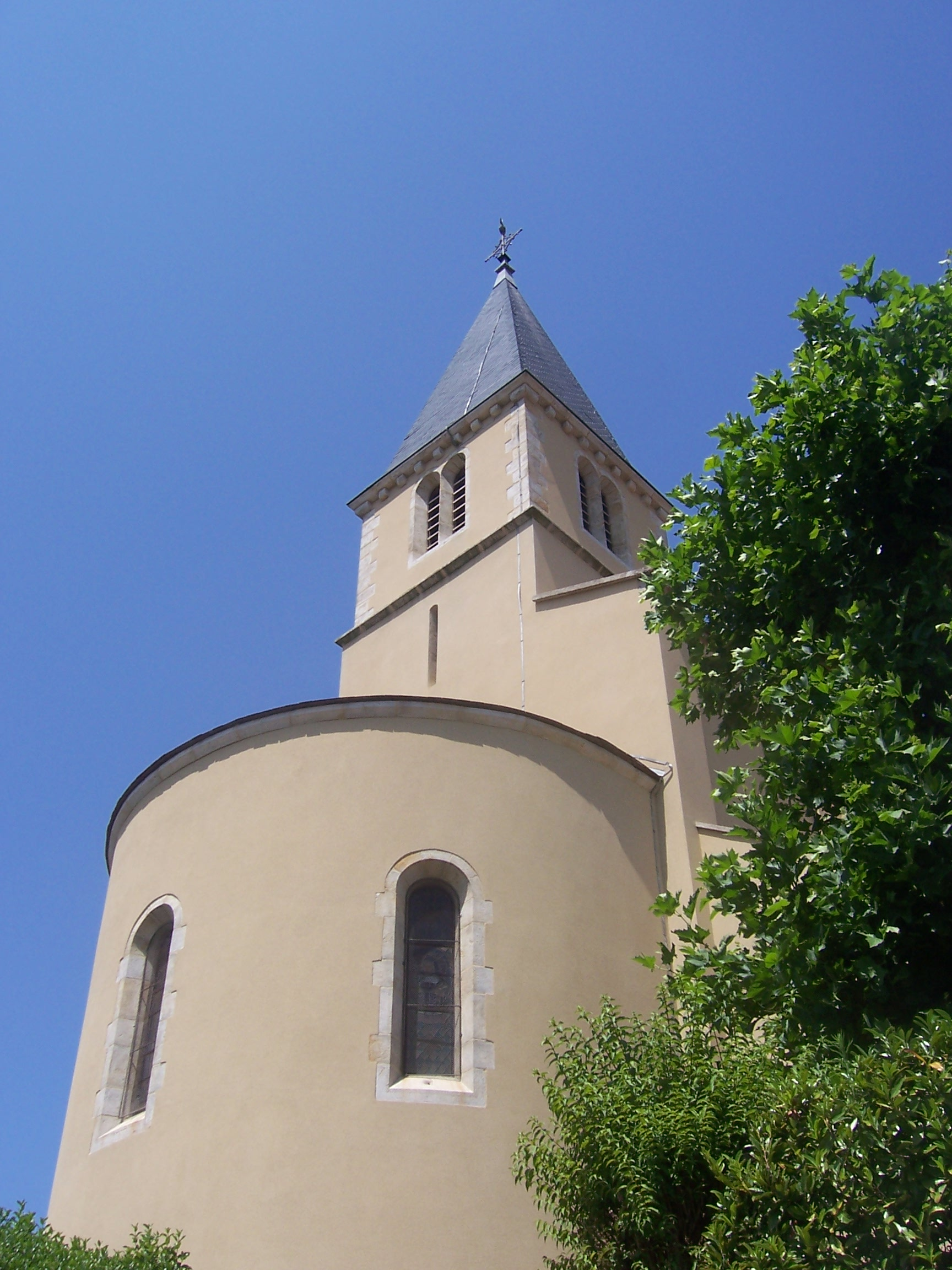
- The church in Pouilloux
- Location of Pouilloux
- Location within France Location within Bourgogne-Franche-Comté
- Coordinates: 46°36′31″N 4°21′42″E
- Country: France
- Region: Bourgogne-Franche-Comté
- Department: Saône-et-Loire
- Arrondissement: Autun
- Canton: Charolles
- Intercommunality: CU Creusot Montceau
- Area^{1}: 18.4 km^{2} (7.1 sq mi)
- Elevation: 385 m (1,263 ft)
- Highest elevation: 405 m (1,329 ft)
- Lowest elevation: 267 m (876 ft)
- Population (2023): 946
  - Density: 51.4/km^{2} (133/sq mi)
- Time zone: UTC+01:00 (CET)
  - Summer (DST): UTC+02:00 (CEST)
- INSEE/Postal code: 71356 /71230
- ^{1} French Land Register data, which excludes lakes, ponds, glaciers > 1 km^{2} (0.386 sq mi or 247 acres) and river estuaries.

Pouilloux (French pronunciation: [puju]) is a commune in the Saône-et-Loire department in the region of Bourgogne-Franche-Comté in eastern France.

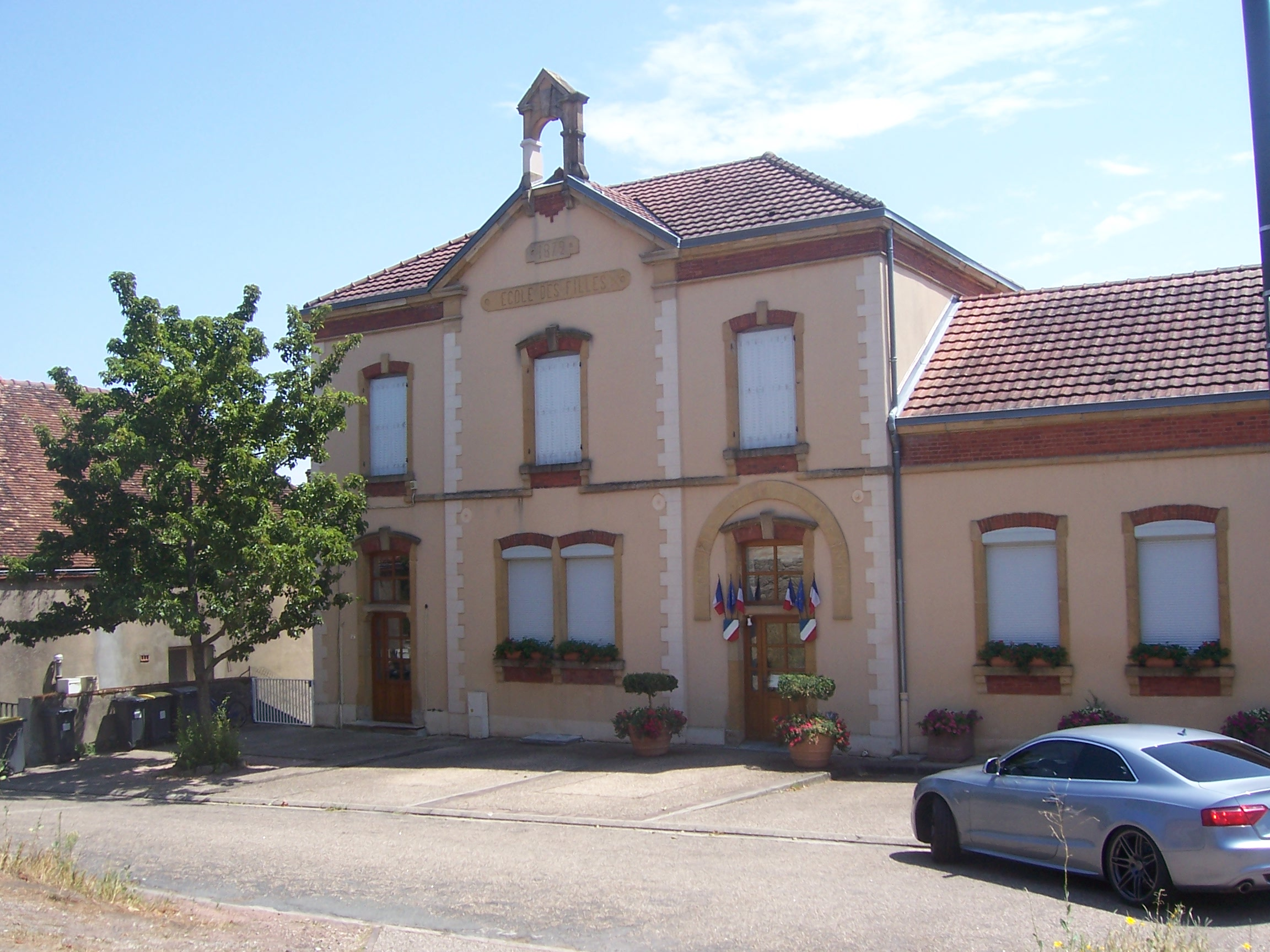
Town hall

== Geography ==
The Bourbince forms part of the commune's northwestern border.

== See also ==
- Communes of the Saône-et-Loire department
