= Nochize =

- Commune
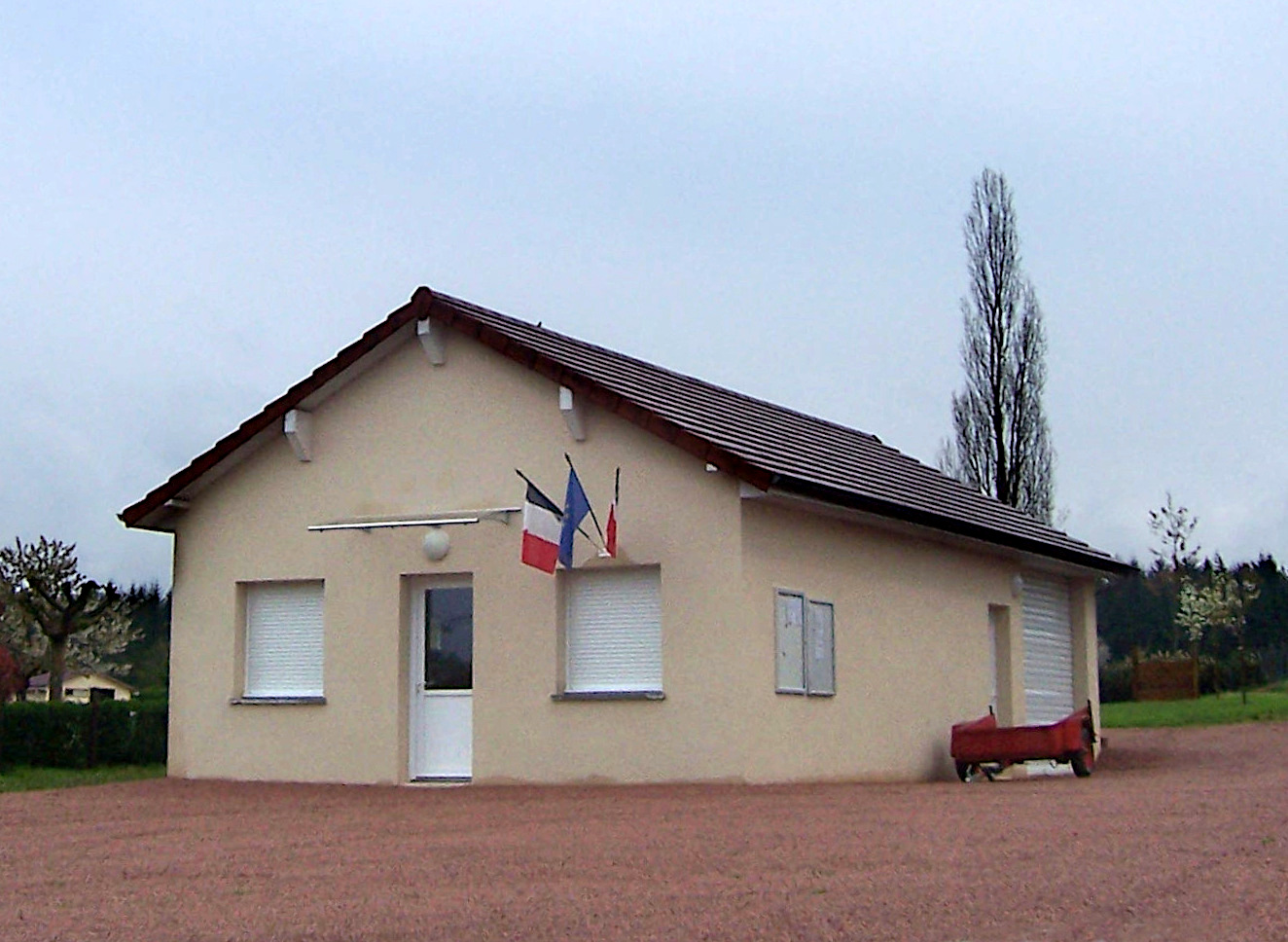
- The town hall in Nochize
- Location of Nochize
- Location within France Location within Bourgogne-Franche-Comté
- Coordinates: 46°23′46″N 4°10′26″E
- Country: France
- Region: Bourgogne-Franche-Comté
- Department: Saône-et-Loire
- Arrondissement: Charolles
- Canton: Paray-le-Monial
- Area^{1}: 11.07 km^{2} (4.27 sq mi)
- Elevation: 300 m (980 ft)
- Highest elevation: 353 m (1,158 ft)
- Lowest elevation: 249 m (817 ft)
- Population (2023): 99
  - Density: 8.9/km^{2} (23/sq mi)
- Time zone: UTC+01:00 (CET)
  - Summer (DST): UTC+02:00 (CEST)
- INSEE/Postal code: 71331 /71600
- ^{1} French Land Register data, which excludes lakes, ponds, glaciers > 1 km^{2} (0.386 sq mi or 247 acres) and river estuaries.

Nochize (French pronunciation: [nɔʃiz]) is a commune in the Saône-et-Loire department in the region of Bourgogne-Franche-Comté in eastern France.

== Geography ==
The Arconce forms the commune's south-eastern border.

== See also ==
- Communes of the Saône-et-Loire department
