= Bourg-le-Comte =

- Commune
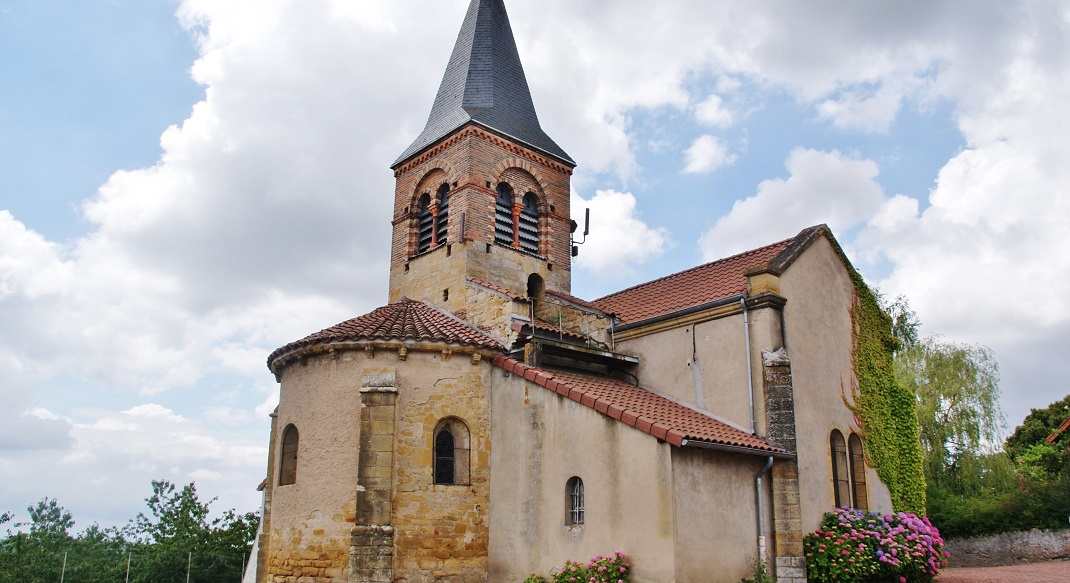
- The church in Bourg-le-Comte
- Location of Bourg-le-Comte
- Location within France Location within Bourgogne-Franche-Comté
- Coordinates: 46°18′35″N 3°59′21″E
- Country: France
- Region: Bourgogne-Franche-Comté
- Department: Saône-et-Loire
- Arrondissement: Charolles
- Canton: Paray-le-Monial

Government
  - Mayor (2021–2026): Stéphane Luceau
- Area^{1}: 11.4 km^{2} (4.4 sq mi)
- Elevation: 289 m (948 ft)
- Highest elevation: 316 m (1,037 ft)
- Lowest elevation: 238 m (781 ft)
- Population (2023): 168
  - Density: 14.7/km^{2} (38.2/sq mi)
- Time zone: UTC+01:00 (CET)
  - Summer (DST): UTC+02:00 (CEST)
- INSEE/Postal code: 71048 /71110
- ^{1} French Land Register data, which excludes lakes, ponds, glaciers > 1 km^{2} (0.386 sq mi or 247 acres) and river estuaries.

Bourg-le-Comte is a commune in the Saône-et-Loire department in the region of Bourgogne-Franche-Comté in eastern France.

== See also ==
- Communes of the Saône-et-Loire department
