= Saint-Didier-en-Brionnais =

- Commune
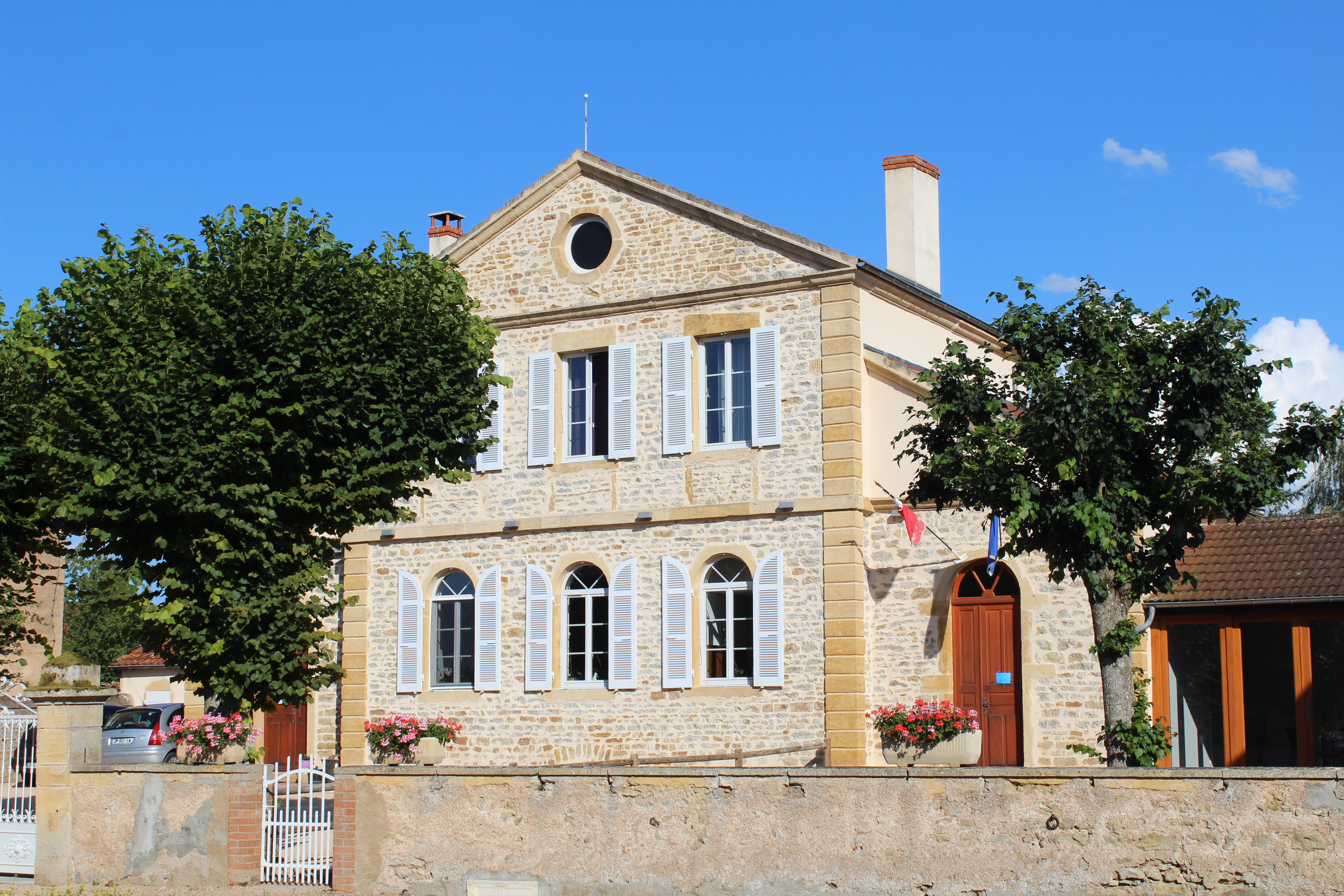
- The town hall in Saint-Didier-en-Brionnais
- Location of Saint-Didier-en-Brionnais
- Location within France Location within Bourgogne-Franche-Comté
- Coordinates: 46°20′15″N 4°07′36″E
- Country: France
- Region: Bourgogne-Franche-Comté
- Department: Saône-et-Loire
- Arrondissement: Charolles
- Canton: Chauffailles

Government
  - Mayor (2020–2026): René Sarroca
- Area^{1}: 11.34 km^{2} (4.38 sq mi)
- Elevation: 220 m (720 ft)
- Highest elevation: 348 m (1,142 ft)
- Lowest elevation: 254 m (833 ft)
- Population (2023): 121
  - Density: 10.7/km^{2} (27.6/sq mi)
- Time zone: UTC+01:00 (CET)
  - Summer (DST): UTC+02:00 (CEST)
- INSEE/Postal code: 71406 /71110
- ^{1} French Land Register data, which excludes lakes, ponds, glaciers > 1 km^{2} (0.386 sq mi or 247 acres) and river estuaries.

Saint-Didier-en-Brionnais (French pronunciation: [sɛ̃ didje ɑ̃ bʁijɔnɛ]) is a commune in the Saône-et-Loire department in the region of Bourgogne-Franche-Comté in eastern France.

== Geography ==
The Arconce flows southwestward through the middle of the commune.

== See also ==
- Communes of the Saône-et-Loire department
