= Anzy-le-Duc =

- Commune
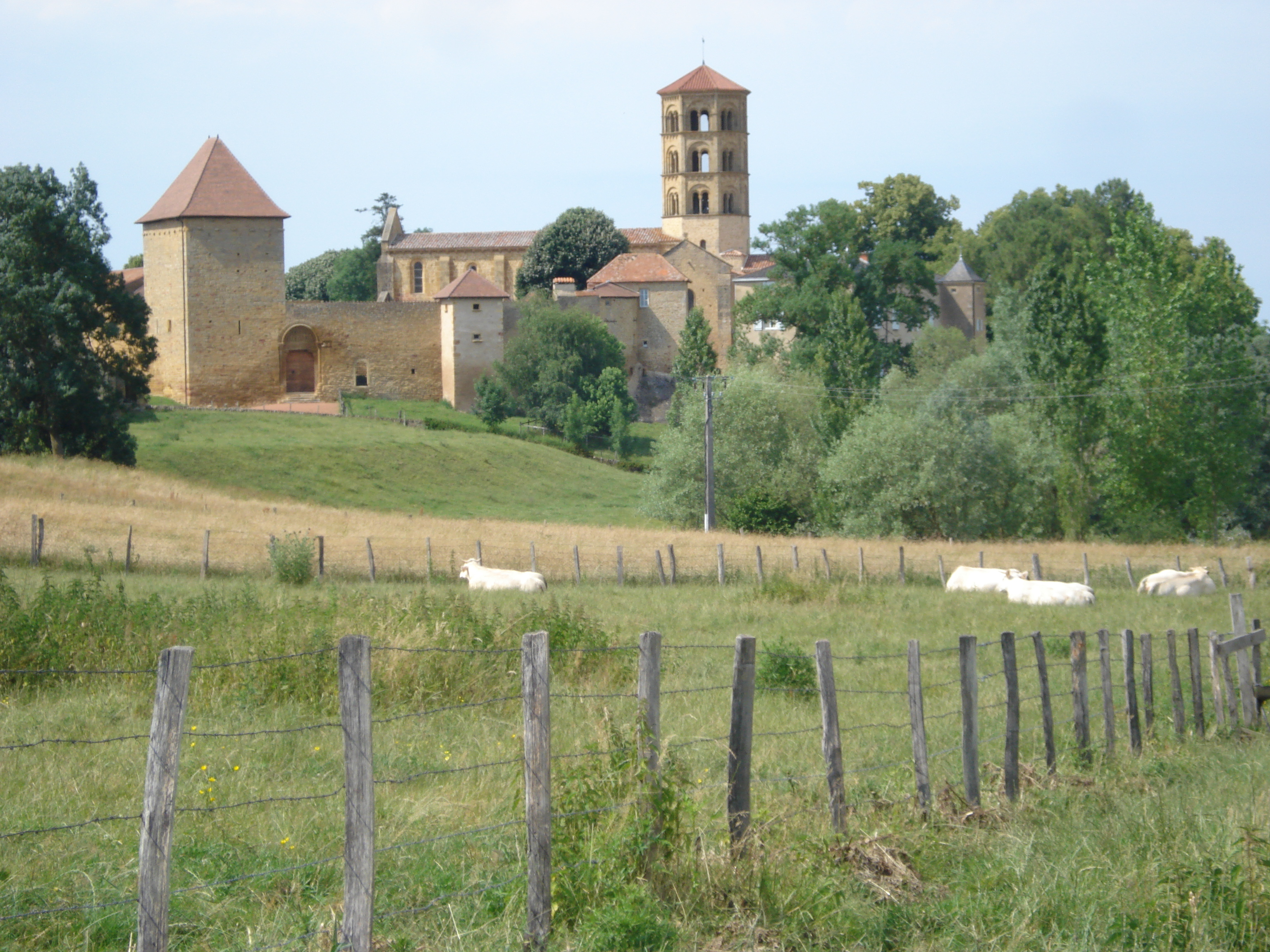
- Location of Anzy-le-Duc
- Location within France Location within Bourgogne-Franche-Comté
- Coordinates: 46°19′15″N 4°03′39″E
- Country: France
- Region: Bourgogne-Franche-Comté
- Department: Saône-et-Loire
- Arrondissement: Charolles
- Canton: Paray-le-Monial

Government
  - Mayor (2020–2026): Jean-Marc Pommier
- Area^{1}: 25.06 km^{2} (9.68 sq mi)
- Elevation: 275 m (902 ft)
- Highest elevation: 345 m (1,132 ft)
- Lowest elevation: 243 m (797 ft)
- Population (2023): 419
  - Density: 16.7/km^{2} (43.3/sq mi)
- Time zone: UTC+01:00 (CET)
  - Summer (DST): UTC+02:00 (CEST)
- INSEE/Postal code: 71011 /71110
- ^{1} French Land Register data, which excludes lakes, ponds, glaciers > 1 km^{2} (0.386 sq mi or 247 acres) and river estuaries.

Anzy-le-Duc (French pronunciation: [ɑ̃zi lə dyk]) is a commune in the Saône-et-Loire department in the region of Bourgogne-Franche-Comté in eastern France.

== Geography ==
The commune lies in the southwest of the department in the valley of the Loire.

The village lies in the middle of the commune, above the left bank of the Arconce, which flows southwest through the eastern part of the commune, then north through its central part.

== Population ==
Historical population
Year	Pop.	±% p.a.
1968	518	—
1975	447	−2.08%
1982	428	−0.62%
1990	458	+0.85%
1999	434	−0.60%
2007	441	+0.20%
2012	435	−0.27%
2017	472	+1.65%
2023	419	−1.97%
Source: INSEE

== See also ==
- Communes of the Saône-et-Loire department
