= Saint-Martin-du-Lac =

- Commune
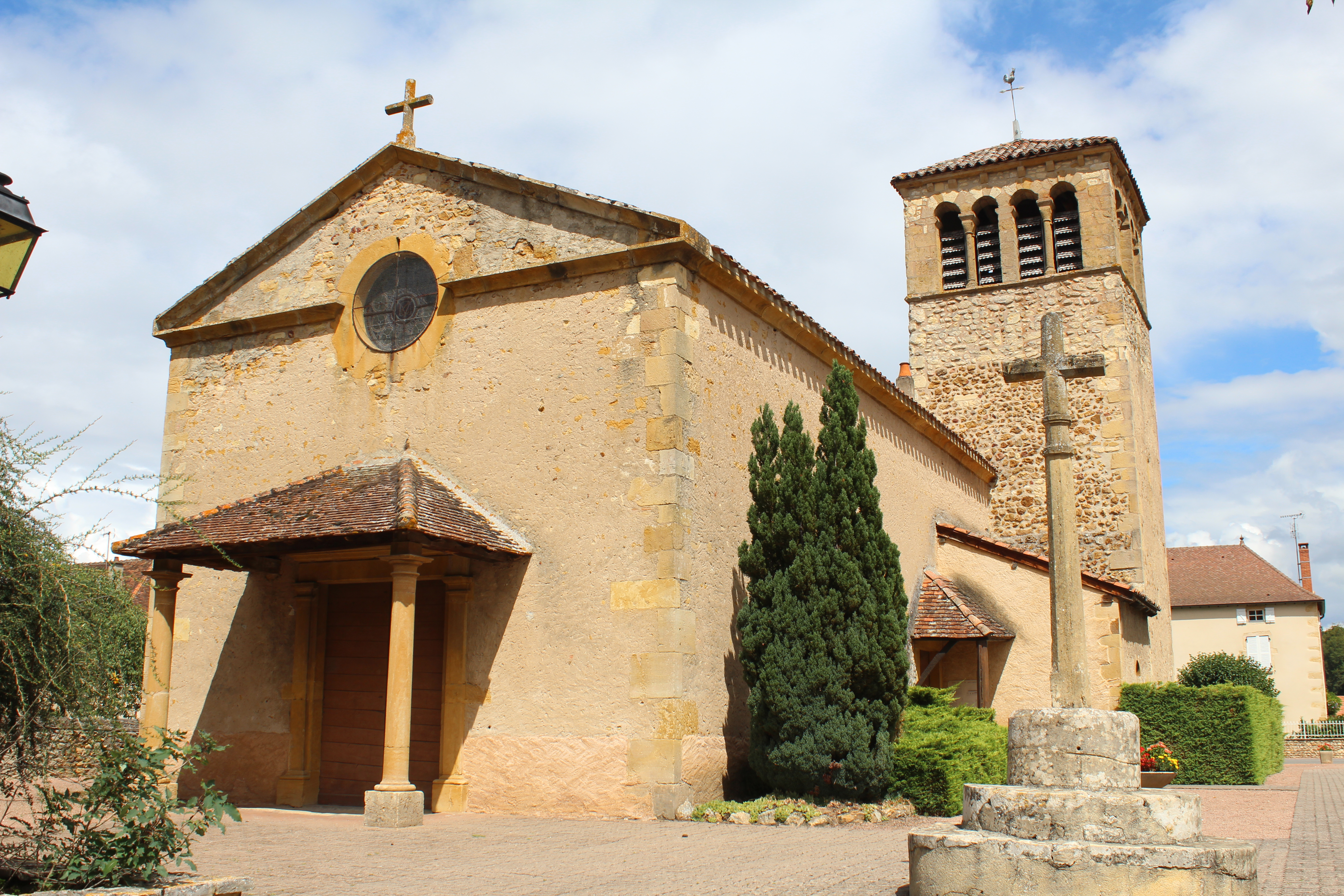
- The church in Saint-Martin-du-Lac
- Location of Saint-Martin-du-Lac
- Location within France Location within Bourgogne-Franche-Comté
- Coordinates: 46°15′17″N 4°02′42″E
- Country: France
- Region: Bourgogne-Franche-Comté
- Department: Saône-et-Loire
- Arrondissement: Charolles
- Canton: Paray-le-Monial
- Area^{1}: 14.04 km^{2} (5.42 sq mi)
- Elevation: 250 m (820 ft)
- Highest elevation: 417 m (1,368 ft)
- Lowest elevation: 242 m (794 ft)
- Population (2023): 234
  - Density: 16.7/km^{2} (43.2/sq mi)
- Time zone: UTC+01:00 (CET)
  - Summer (DST): UTC+02:00 (CEST)
- INSEE/Postal code: 71453 /71110
- ^{1} French Land Register data, which excludes lakes, ponds, glaciers > 1 km^{2} (0.386 sq mi or 247 acres) and river estuaries.

Saint-Martin-du-Lac (French pronunciation: [sɛ̃ maʁtɛ̃ dy lak]) is a commune in the Saône-et-Loire department in the region of Bourgogne-Franche-Comté in eastern France.

== See also ==
- Communes of the Saône-et-Loire department
