= Chambilly =

- Commune
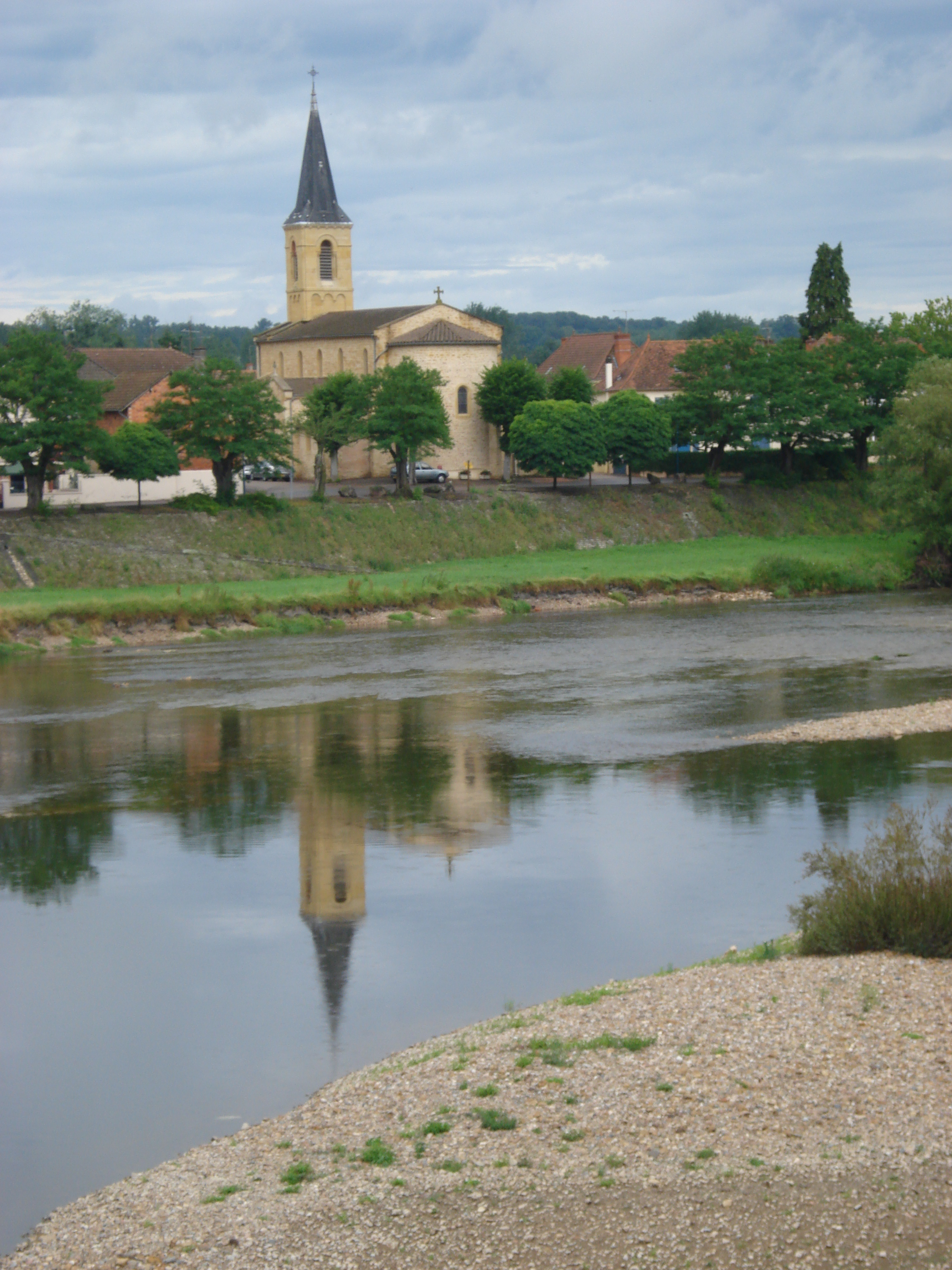
- The Loire river and church in Chambilly
- Location of Chambilly
- Location within France Location within Bourgogne-Franche-Comté
- Coordinates: 46°16′50″N 4°00′51″E
- Country: France
- Region: Bourgogne-Franche-Comté
- Department: Saône-et-Loire
- Arrondissement: Charolles
- Canton: Paray-le-Monial
- Area^{1}: 13.63 km^{2} (5.26 sq mi)
- Elevation: 248 m (814 ft)
- Highest elevation: 320 m (1,050 ft)
- Lowest elevation: 238 m (781 ft)
- Population (2023): 464
  - Density: 34.0/km^{2} (88.2/sq mi)
- Time zone: UTC+01:00 (CET)
  - Summer (DST): UTC+02:00 (CEST)
- INSEE/Postal code: 71077 /71110
- ^{1} French Land Register data, which excludes lakes, ponds, glaciers > 1 km^{2} (0.386 sq mi or 247 acres) and river estuaries.

Chambilly (French pronunciation: [ʃɑ̃biji]) is a commune in the Saône-et-Loire department in the region of Bourgogne-Franche-Comté in eastern France.

== See also ==
- Communes of the Saône-et-Loire department
