= L'Hôpital-le-Mercier =

- Commune
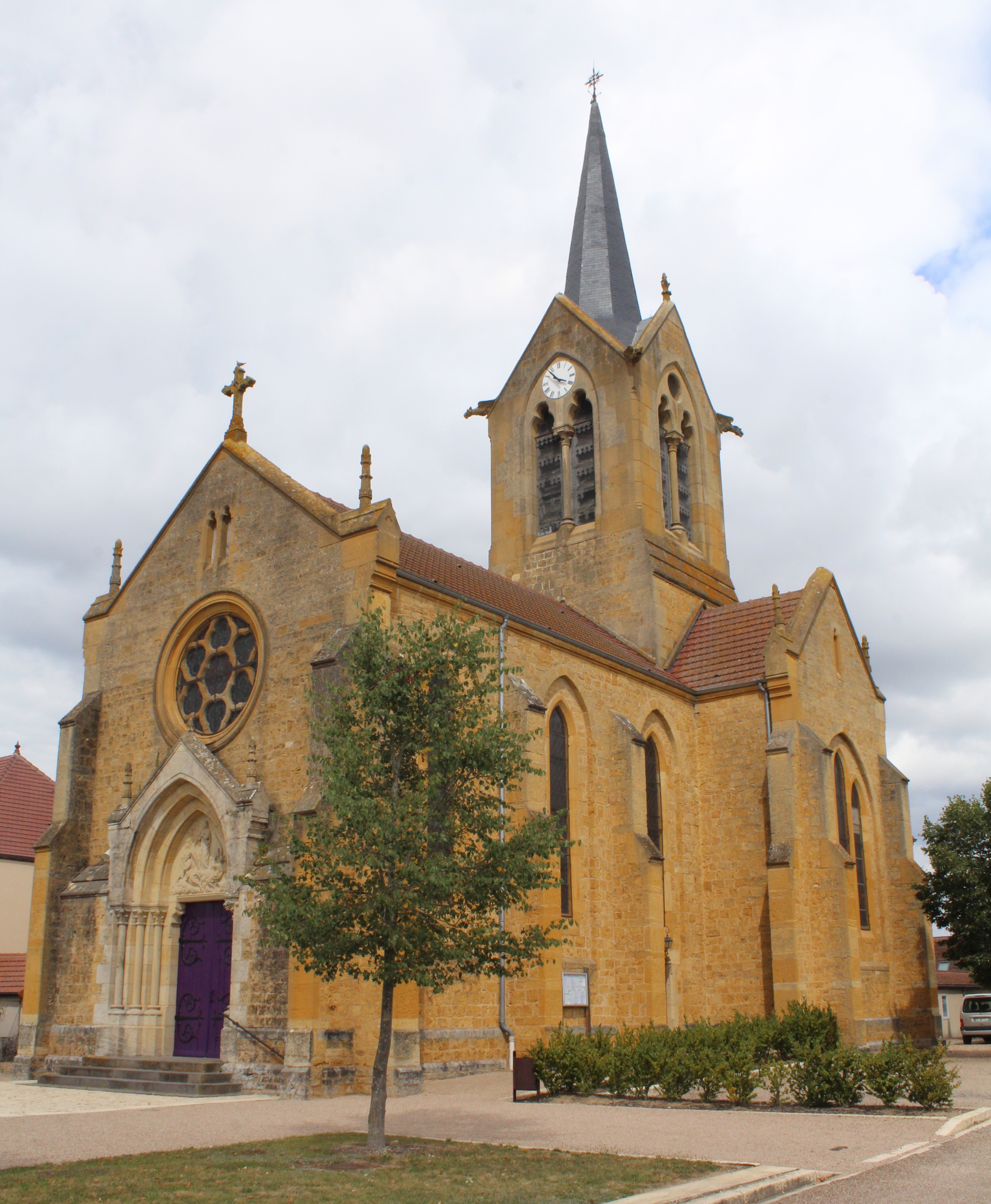
- The church in L'Hôpital-le-Mercier
- Location of L'Hôpital-le-Mercier
- Location within France Location within Bourgogne-Franche-Comté
- Coordinates: 46°23′34″N 4°00′56″E
- Country: France
- Region: Bourgogne-Franche-Comté
- Department: Saône-et-Loire
- Arrondissement: Charolles
- Canton: Paray-le-Monial
- Area^{1}: 16.47 km^{2} (6.36 sq mi)
- Elevation: 241 m (791 ft)
- Highest elevation: 256 m (840 ft)
- Lowest elevation: 229 m (751 ft)
- Population (2023): 294
  - Density: 17.9/km^{2} (46.2/sq mi)
- Time zone: UTC+01:00 (CET)
  - Summer (DST): UTC+02:00 (CEST)
- INSEE/Postal code: 71233 /71600
- ^{1} French Land Register data, which excludes lakes, ponds, glaciers > 1 km^{2} (0.386 sq mi or 247 acres) and river estuaries.

L'Hôpital-le-Mercier (French pronunciation: [lopital lə mɛʁsje]) is a commune in the Saône-et-Loire department in the region of Bourgogne-Franche-Comté in eastern France.

== Geography ==
The Arconce forms most of the commune's eastern border and the Loire parts of its western border.

== See also ==
- Communes of the Saône-et-Loire department
