= Varenne-l'Arconce =

- Commune
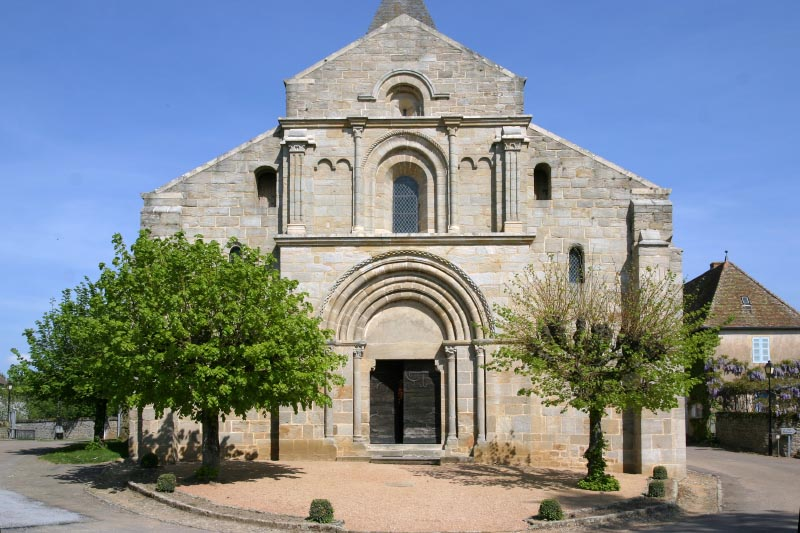
- The Catholic church in Varenne-l'Arconce
- Location of Varenne-l'Arconce
- Location within France Location within Bourgogne-Franche-Comté
- Coordinates: 46°20′21″N 4°09′37″E
- Country: France
- Region: Bourgogne-Franche-Comté
- Department: Saône-et-Loire
- Arrondissement: Charolles
- Canton: Chauffailles
- Intercommunality: None

Government
  - Mayor (2021–2026): Patricia Mommessin
- Area^{1}: 8.3 km^{2} (3.2 sq mi)
- Elevation: 330 m (1,080 ft)
- Highest elevation: 372 m (1,220 ft)
- Lowest elevation: 258 m (846 ft)
- Population (2023): 110
  - Density: 13/km^{2} (34/sq mi)
- Time zone: UTC+01:00 (CET)
  - Summer (DST): UTC+02:00 (CEST)
- INSEE/Postal code: 71554 /71110
- ^{1} French Land Register data, which excludes lakes, ponds, glaciers > 1 km^{2} (0.386 sq mi or 247 acres) and river estuaries.

Varenne-l'Arconce is a commune in the Saône-et-Loire department in the region of Bourgogne-Franche-Comté in eastern France.

== Geography ==
The Arconce forms part of the commune's northwestern border.

== See also ==
- Communes of the Saône-et-Loire department
