= Céron =

- Commune
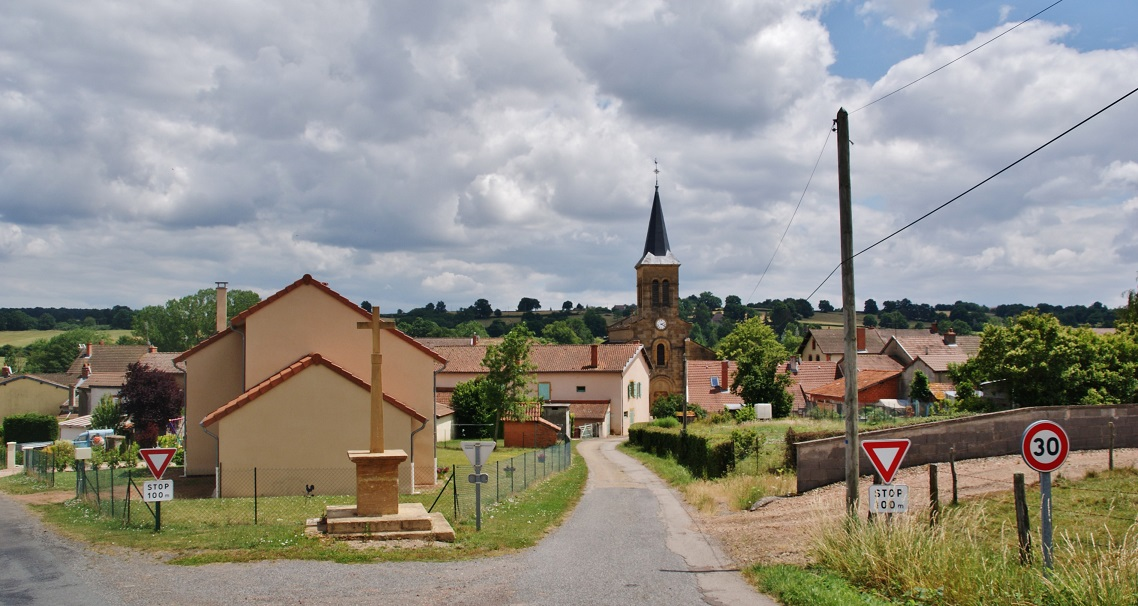
- A general view of Céron

- Coat of arms
- Location of Céron
- Location within France Location within Bourgogne-Franche-Comté
- Coordinates: 46°17′01″N 3°56′41″E
- Country: France
- Region: Bourgogne-Franche-Comté
- Department: Saône-et-Loire
- Arrondissement: Charolles
- Canton: Paray-le-Monial
- Area^{1}: 23.53 km^{2} (9.08 sq mi)
- Elevation: 262 m (860 ft)
- Highest elevation: 333 m (1,093 ft)
- Lowest elevation: 247 m (810 ft)
- Population (2023): 263
  - Density: 11.2/km^{2} (28.9/sq mi)
- Time zone: UTC+01:00 (CET)
  - Summer (DST): UTC+02:00 (CEST)
- INSEE/Postal code: 71071 /71110
- ^{1} French Land Register data, which excludes lakes, ponds, glaciers > 1 km^{2} (0.386 sq mi or 247 acres) and river estuaries.

Céron (French pronunciation: [seʁɔ̃]) is a commune in the Saône-et-Loire department in the region of Bourgogne-Franche-Comté in eastern France.

== See also ==
- Communes of the Saône-et-Loire department
