= Palinges =

- Commune
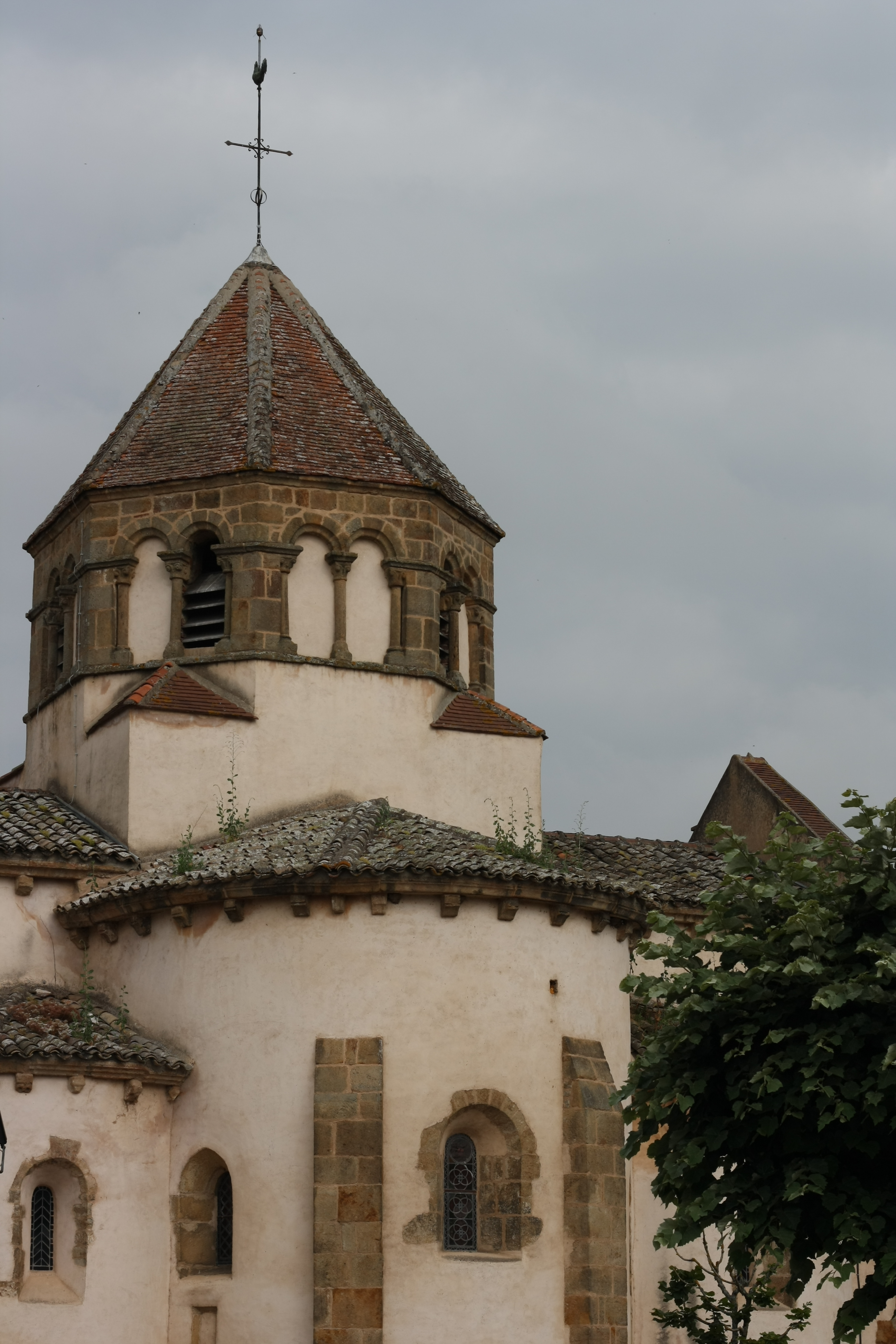

- Coat of arms
- Location of Palinges
- Location within France Location within Bourgogne-Franche-Comté
- Coordinates: 46°33′00″N 4°13′00″E
- Country: France
- Region: Bourgogne-Franche-Comté
- Department: Saône-et-Loire
- Arrondissement: Charolles
- Canton: Charolles
- Area^{1}: 36.55 km^{2} (14.11 sq mi)
- Elevation: 270 m (890 ft)
- Highest elevation: 328 m (1,076 ft)
- Lowest elevation: 251 m (823 ft)
- Population (2023): 1,405
  - Density: 38.44/km^{2} (99.56/sq mi)
- Time zone: UTC+01:00 (CET)
  - Summer (DST): UTC+02:00 (CEST)
- INSEE/Postal code: 71340 /71430
- ^{1} French Land Register data, which excludes lakes, ponds, glaciers > 1 km^{2} (0.386 sq mi or 247 acres) and river estuaries.

Palinges (French pronunciation: [palɛ̃ʒ]) is a commune in the Saône-et-Loire department in the region of Bourgogne-Franche-Comté in eastern France.

== Geography ==
The Bourbince flows south through the middle of the commune.

== Sights ==
Palinges has one of the exceptional chateaus in Saône-et-Loire, the Château de Digoine.

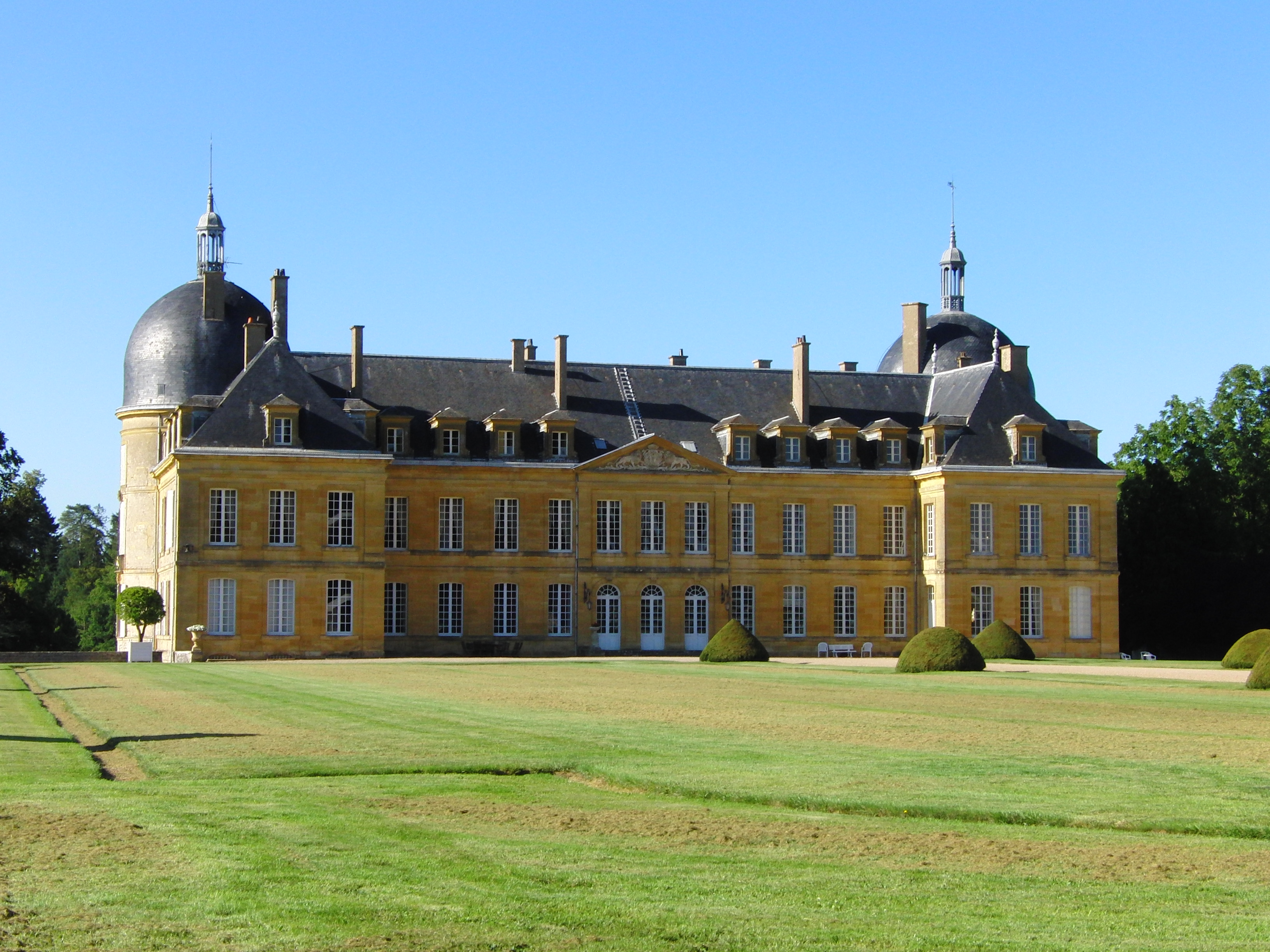
Château de Digoine

== See also ==
- Communes of the Saône-et-Loire department
