= Saint-Léger-lès-Paray =

- Commune
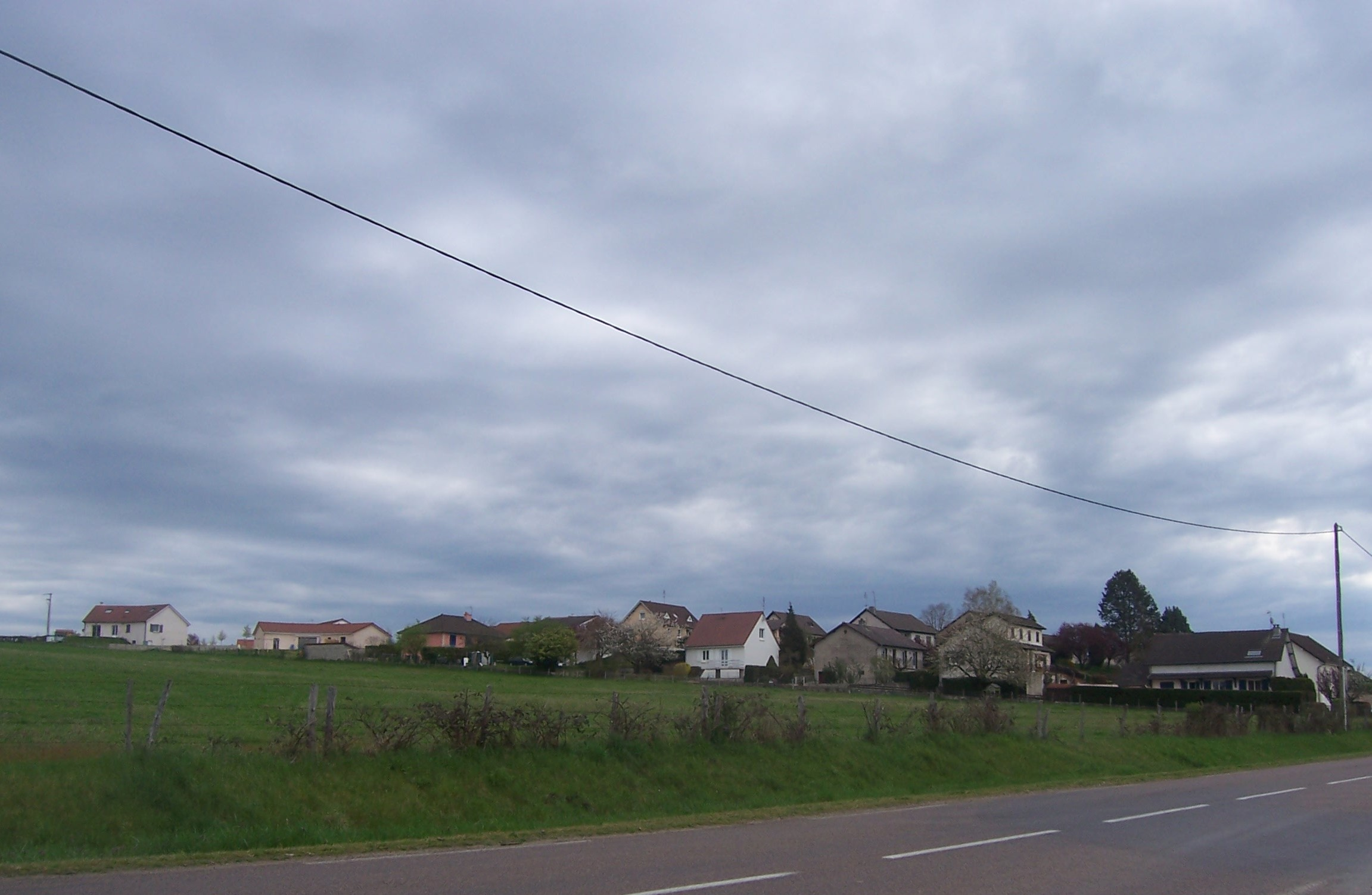
- A general view of Saint-Léger-lès-Paray

- Coat of arms
- Location of Saint-Léger-lès-Paray
- Location within France Location within Bourgogne-Franche-Comté
- Coordinates: 46°28′28″N 4°05′23″E
- Country: France
- Region: Bourgogne-Franche-Comté
- Department: Saône-et-Loire
- Arrondissement: Charolles
- Canton: Paray-le-Monial

Government
  - Mayor (2020–2026): Éric Bourdais
- Area^{1}: 13.37 km^{2} (5.16 sq mi)
- Elevation: 240 m (790 ft)
- Highest elevation: 303 m (994 ft)
- Lowest elevation: 234 m (768 ft)
- Population (2023): 759
  - Density: 56.8/km^{2} (147/sq mi)
- Time zone: UTC+01:00 (CET)
  - Summer (DST): UTC+02:00 (CEST)
- INSEE/Postal code: 71439 /71600
- ^{1} French Land Register data, which excludes lakes, ponds, glaciers > 1 km^{2} (0.386 sq mi or 247 acres) and river estuaries.

Saint-Léger-lès-Paray (French pronunciation: [sɛ̃ leʒe lɛ paʁɛ], literally Saint-Léger near Paray) is a commune in the Saône-et-Loire department in the region of Bourgogne-Franche-Comté in eastern France.

== Geography ==
The Bourbince forms the commune's southwestern border.

== See also ==
- Communes of the Saône-et-Loire department
