= Hautefond =

- Commune
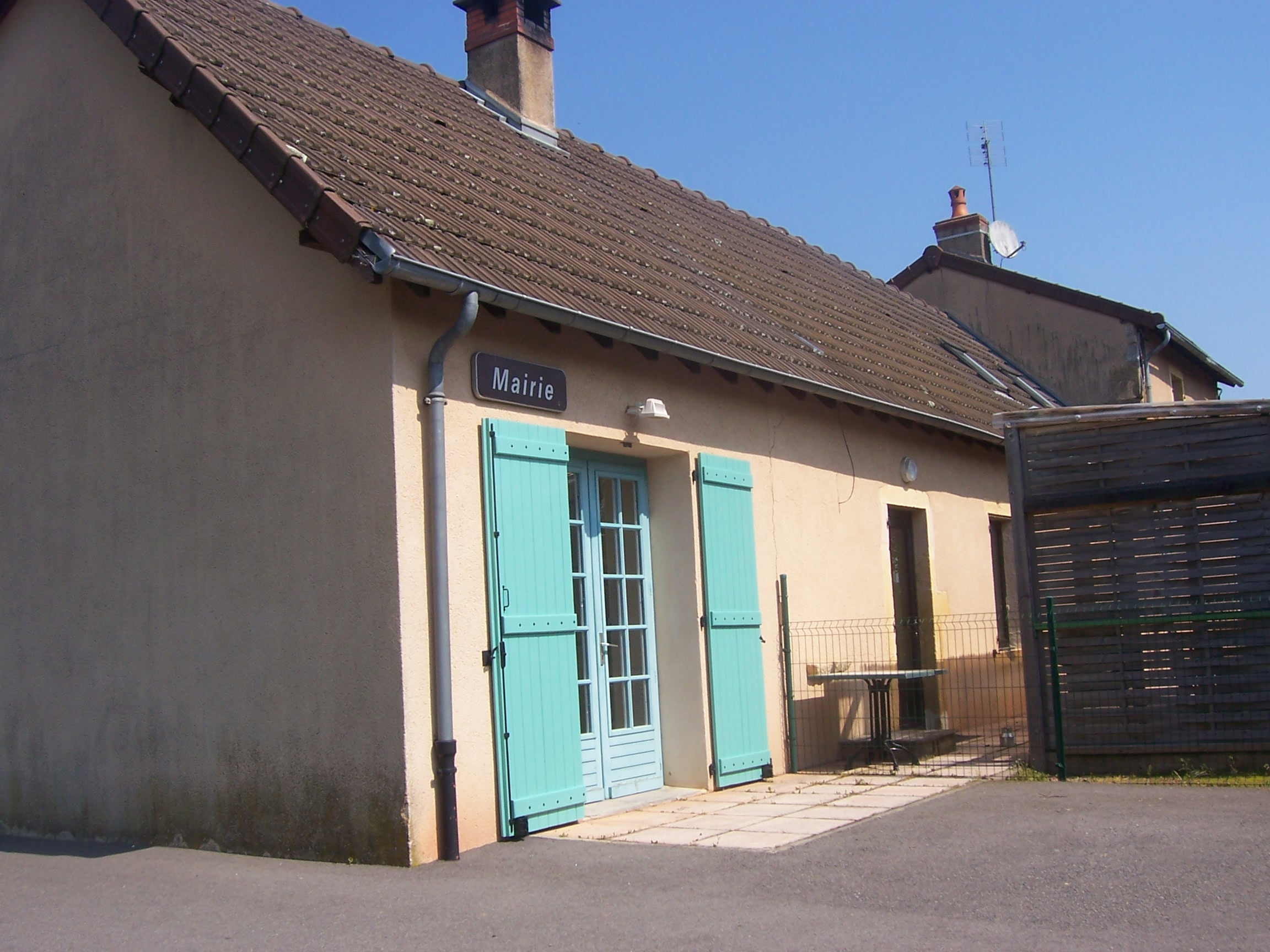
- Town hall
- Location of Hautefond
- Location within France Location within Bourgogne-Franche-Comté
- Coordinates: 46°26′20″N 4°11′39″E
- Country: France
- Region: Bourgogne-Franche-Comté
- Department: Saône-et-Loire
- Arrondissement: Charolles
- Canton: Paray-le-Monial
- Area^{1}: 13.62 km^{2} (5.26 sq mi)
- Elevation: 242 m (794 ft)
- Highest elevation: 338 m (1,109 ft)
- Lowest elevation: 243 m (797 ft)
- Population (2023): 201
  - Density: 14.8/km^{2} (38.2/sq mi)
- Time zone: UTC+01:00 (CET)
  - Summer (DST): UTC+02:00 (CEST)
- INSEE/Postal code: 71232 /71600
- ^{1} French Land Register data, which excludes lakes, ponds, glaciers > 1 km^{2} (0.386 sq mi or 247 acres) and river estuaries.

Hautefond (French pronunciation: [otfɔ̃]) is a commune in the Saône-et-Loire department in the region of Bourgogne-Franche-Comté in eastern France.

== See also ==
- Communes of the Saône-et-Loire department
