= Lugny-lès-Charolles =

- Commune
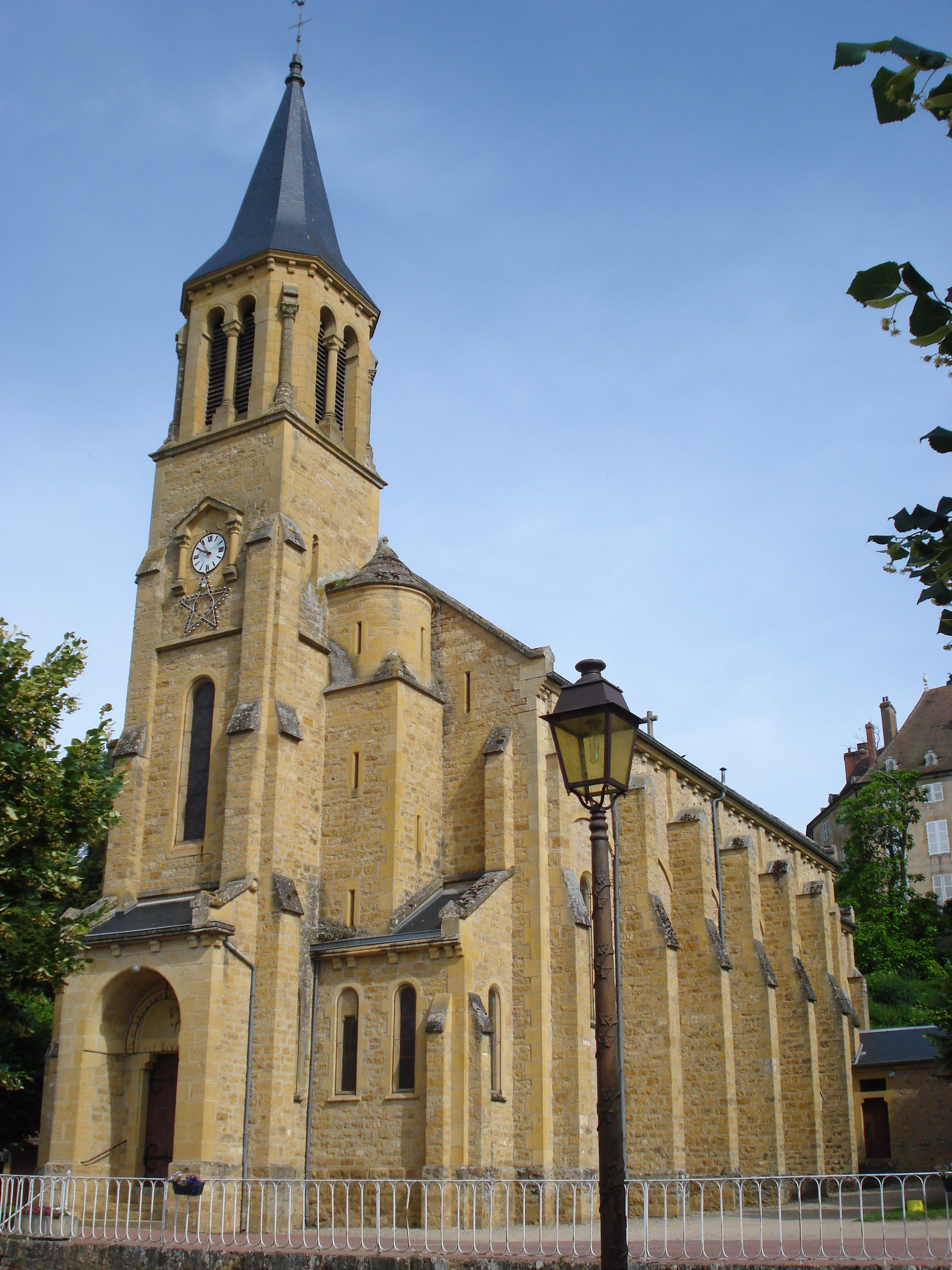
- The church in Lugny-lès-Charolles

- Coat of arms
- Location of Lugny-lès-Charolles
- Location within France Location within Bourgogne-Franche-Comté
- Coordinates: 46°24′42″N 4°12′45″E
- Country: France
- Region: Bourgogne-Franche-Comté
- Department: Saône-et-Loire
- Arrondissement: Charolles
- Canton: Charolles
- Area^{1}: 16.72 km^{2} (6.46 sq mi)
- Elevation: 300 m (980 ft)
- Highest elevation: 365 m (1,198 ft)
- Lowest elevation: 265 m (869 ft)
- Population (2023): 311
  - Density: 18.6/km^{2} (48.2/sq mi)
- Time zone: UTC+01:00 (CET)
  - Summer (DST): UTC+02:00 (CEST)
- INSEE/Postal code: 71268 /71120
- ^{1} French Land Register data, which excludes lakes, ponds, glaciers > 1 km^{2} (0.386 sq mi or 247 acres) and river estuaries.

Lugny-lès-Charolles (French pronunciation: [lyɲi lɛ ʃaʁɔl], literally Lugny near Charolles) is a commune in the Saône-et-Loire department in the region of Bourgogne-Franche-Comté in eastern France.

== Geography ==
The Arconce forms part of the commune's eastern border, flows southwest through the middle of the commune, then forms part of its southwestern border.

== See also ==
- Communes of the Saône-et-Loire department
