= Volesvres =

- Commune
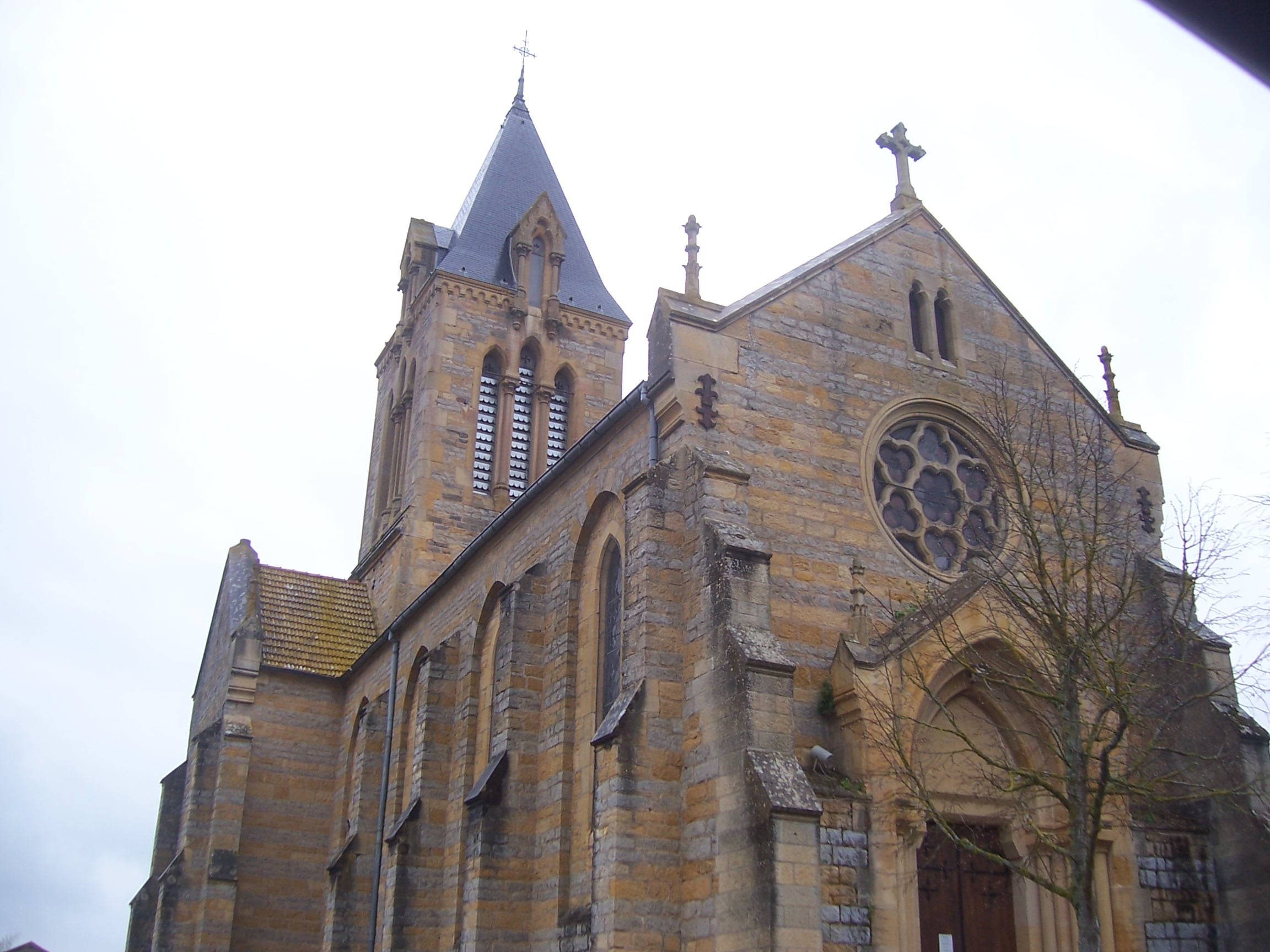
- The church in Volesvres
- Location of Volesvres
- Location within France Location within Bourgogne-Franche-Comté
- Coordinates: 46°28′21″N 4°09′37″E
- Country: France
- Region: Bourgogne-Franche-Comté
- Department: Saône-et-Loire
- Arrondissement: Charolles
- Canton: Paray-le-Monial
- Intercommunality: Le Grand Charolais

Government
  - Mayor (2020–2026): Richard Perrier
- Area^{1}: 21.53 km^{2} (8.31 sq mi)
- Elevation: 245 m (804 ft)
- Highest elevation: 307 m (1,007 ft)
- Lowest elevation: 239 m (784 ft)
- Population (2023): 665
  - Density: 30.9/km^{2} (80.0/sq mi)
- Time zone: UTC+01:00 (CET)
  - Summer (DST): UTC+02:00 (CEST)
- INSEE/Postal code: 71590 /71600
- ^{1} French Land Register data, which excludes lakes, ponds, glaciers > 1 km^{2} (0.386 sq mi or 247 acres) and river estuaries.

Volesvres (French pronunciation: [vɔlɛvʁ]) is a commune in Saône-et-Loire, a department in the region of Bourgogne-Franche-Comté in eastern France.

== Geography ==
The Bourbince forms most of the commune's north-eastern border, then flows south-southwestward through the middle of the commune.

== See also ==
- Communes of the Saône-et-Loire department
