= Bourbince =

River in central eastern France

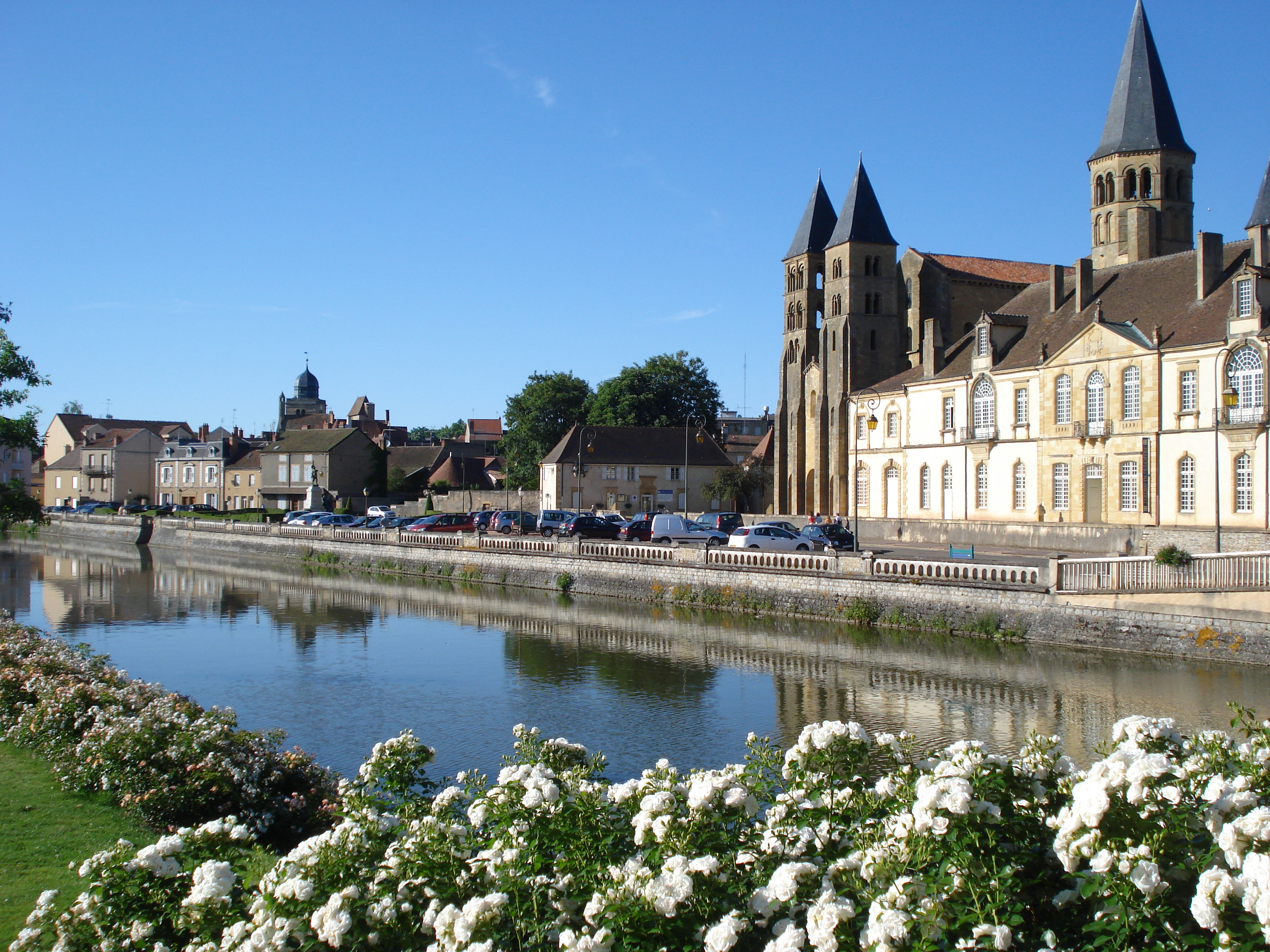
- The Bourbince with the Basilica of Paray-le-Monial

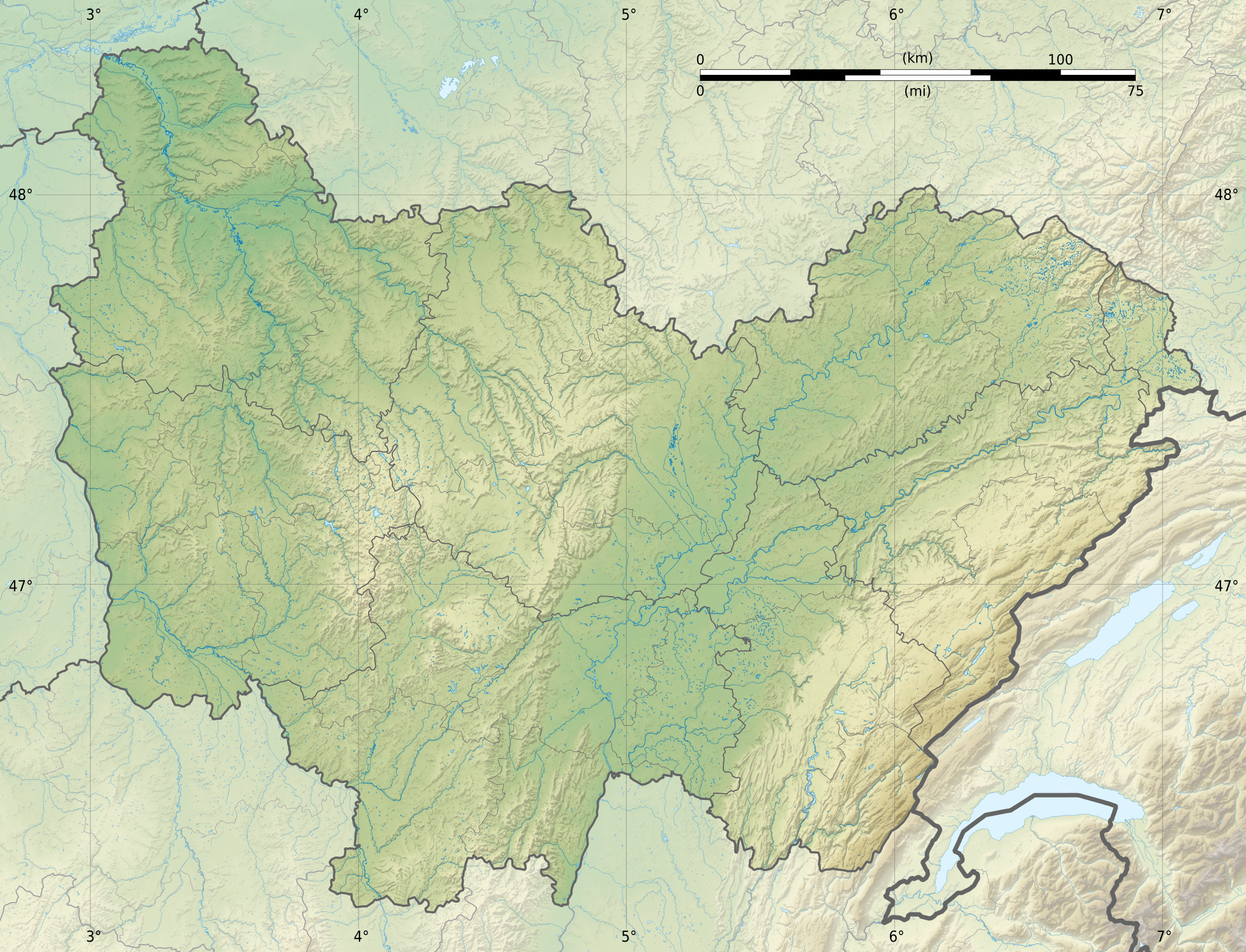
- Location within France Location within Bourgogne-Franche-Comté

Location
- Country: France

Physical characteristics
- Source
  - location: In Montcenis
  - coordinates: 46°47′11″N 04°23′27″E
  - elevation: 365 m (1,198 ft)
- Mouth
  - location: Arroux
  - coordinates: 46°30′02″N 03°58′59″E
  - elevation: 226 m (741 ft)
- Length: 82.4 km (51.2 mi)
- Basin size: 845 km^{2} (326 sq mi)
- Discharge
  - average: 7.88 m^{3}/s (278 cu ft/s)

Basin features
- Progression: Arroux→ Loire→ Atlantic Ocean

The Bourbince (French pronunciation: [buʁbɛ̃s]) is an 82.4 km (51.2 mi) long river in the Saône-et-Loire département, in central eastern France. Its source is at Montcenis. It flows generally southwest. It is a left tributary of the river Arroux into which it flows at Digoin.

== Communes along its course ==
The Bourbince flows through the following communes, ordered from source to mouth: Montcenis, Torcy, Les Bizots, Saint-Eusèbe, Blanzy, Montceau-les-Mines, Saint-Vallier, Pouilloux, Ciry-le-Noble, Génelard, Palinges, Saint-Aubin-en-Charollais, Volesvres, Vitry-en-Charollais, Paray-le-Monial, Saint-Léger-lès-Paray, Digoin.
