= Versaugues =

- Commune
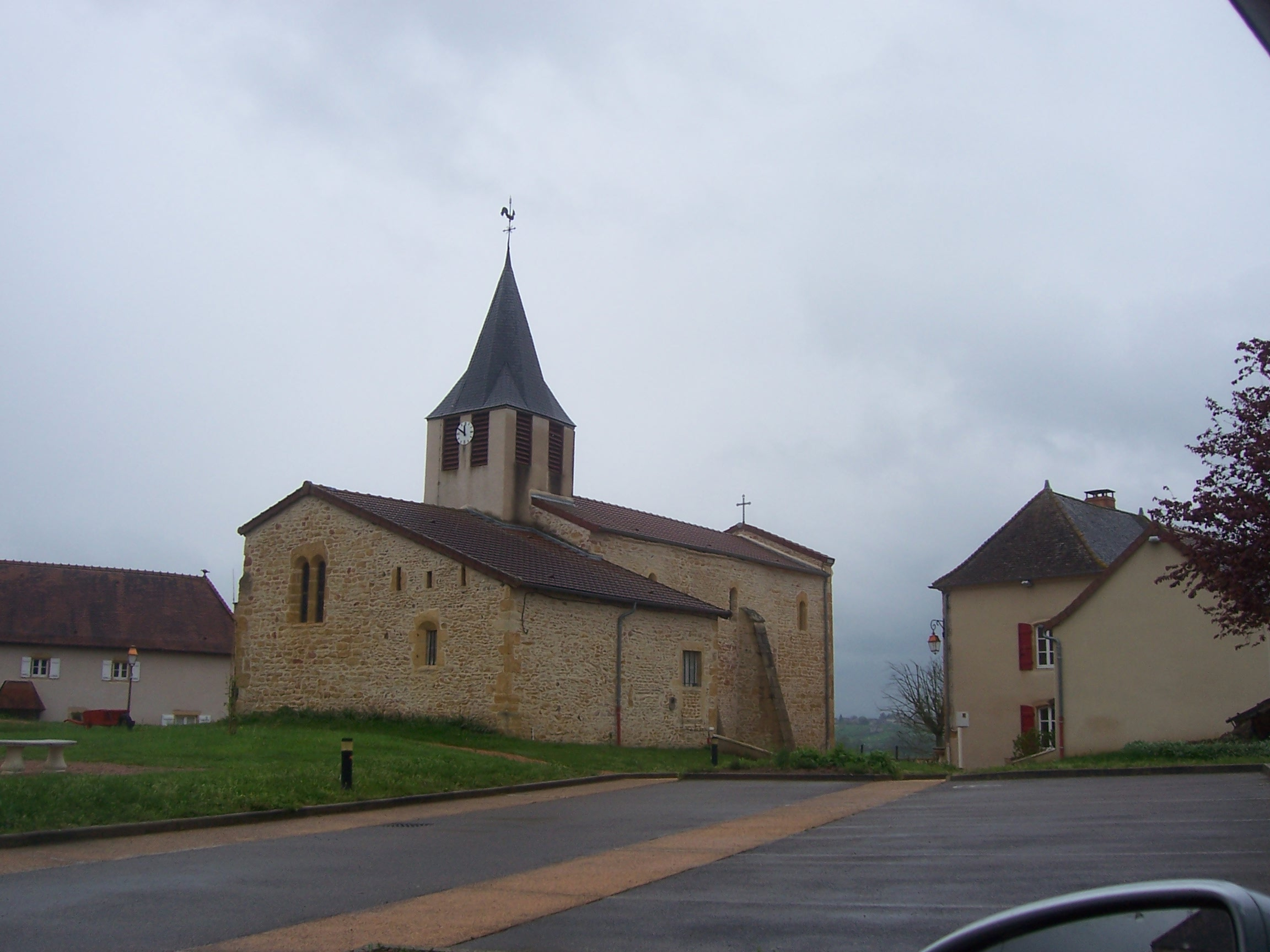
- The church in Versaugues
- Location of Versaugues
- Location within France Location within Bourgogne-Franche-Comté
- Coordinates: 46°21′45″N 4°03′50″E
- Country: France
- Region: Bourgogne-Franche-Comté
- Department: Saône-et-Loire
- Arrondissement: Charolles
- Canton: Paray-le-Monial
- Area^{1}: 10.86 km^{2} (4.19 sq mi)
- Elevation: 270 m (890 ft)
- Highest elevation: 329 m (1,079 ft)
- Lowest elevation: 240 m (790 ft)
- Population (2023): 190
  - Density: 17/km^{2} (45/sq mi)
- Time zone: UTC+01:00 (CET)
  - Summer (DST): UTC+02:00 (CEST)
- INSEE/Postal code: 71573 /71110
- ^{1} French Land Register data, which excludes lakes, ponds, glaciers > 1 km^{2} (0.386 sq mi or 247 acres) and river estuaries.

Versaugues (French pronunciation: [vɛʁsoɡ]) is a commune in the Saône-et-Loire department in the region of Bourgogne-Franche-Comté in eastern France.

== Geography ==
The Ruisseau de Sélore forms the commune's eastern and northern borders, then flows into the Arconce, which forms its western border.

== See also ==
- Communes of the Saône-et-Loire department
