= Montceaux-l'Étoile =

- Commune
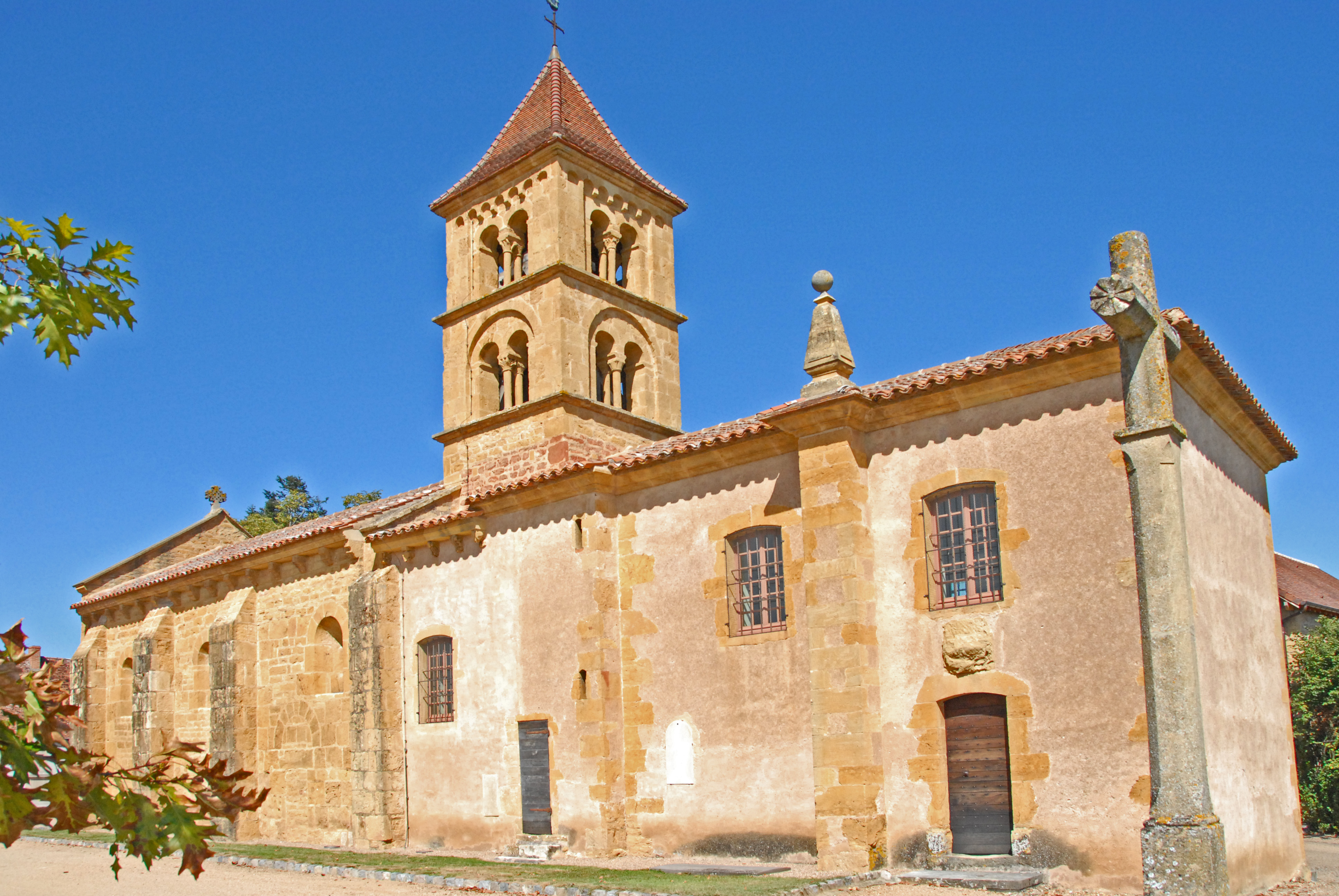
- The church in Montceaux-l'Étoile
- Location of Montceaux-l'Étoile
- Location within France Location within Bourgogne-Franche-Comté
- Coordinates: 46°21′09″N 4°02′40″E
- Country: France
- Region: Bourgogne-Franche-Comté
- Department: Saône-et-Loire
- Arrondissement: Charolles
- Canton: Paray-le-Monial

Government
  - Mayor (2020–2026): Georges Prost
- Area^{1}: 9.64 km^{2} (3.72 sq mi)
- Elevation: 270 m (890 ft)
- Highest elevation: 320 m (1,050 ft)
- Lowest elevation: 239 m (784 ft)
- Population (2023): 301
  - Density: 31.2/km^{2} (80.9/sq mi)
- Time zone: UTC+01:00 (CET)
  - Summer (DST): UTC+02:00 (CEST)
- INSEE/Postal code: 71307 /71110
- ^{1} French Land Register data, which excludes lakes, ponds, glaciers > 1 km^{2} (0.386 sq mi or 247 acres) and river estuaries.

Montceaux-l'Étoile (French pronunciation: [mɔ̃so letwal]) is a commune in the Saône-et-Loire department in the region of Bourgogne-Franche-Comté in eastern France.

== Geography ==
The Arconce forms most of the commune's eastern border.

== See also ==
- Communes of the Saône-et-Loire department
