= Artaix =

- Commune
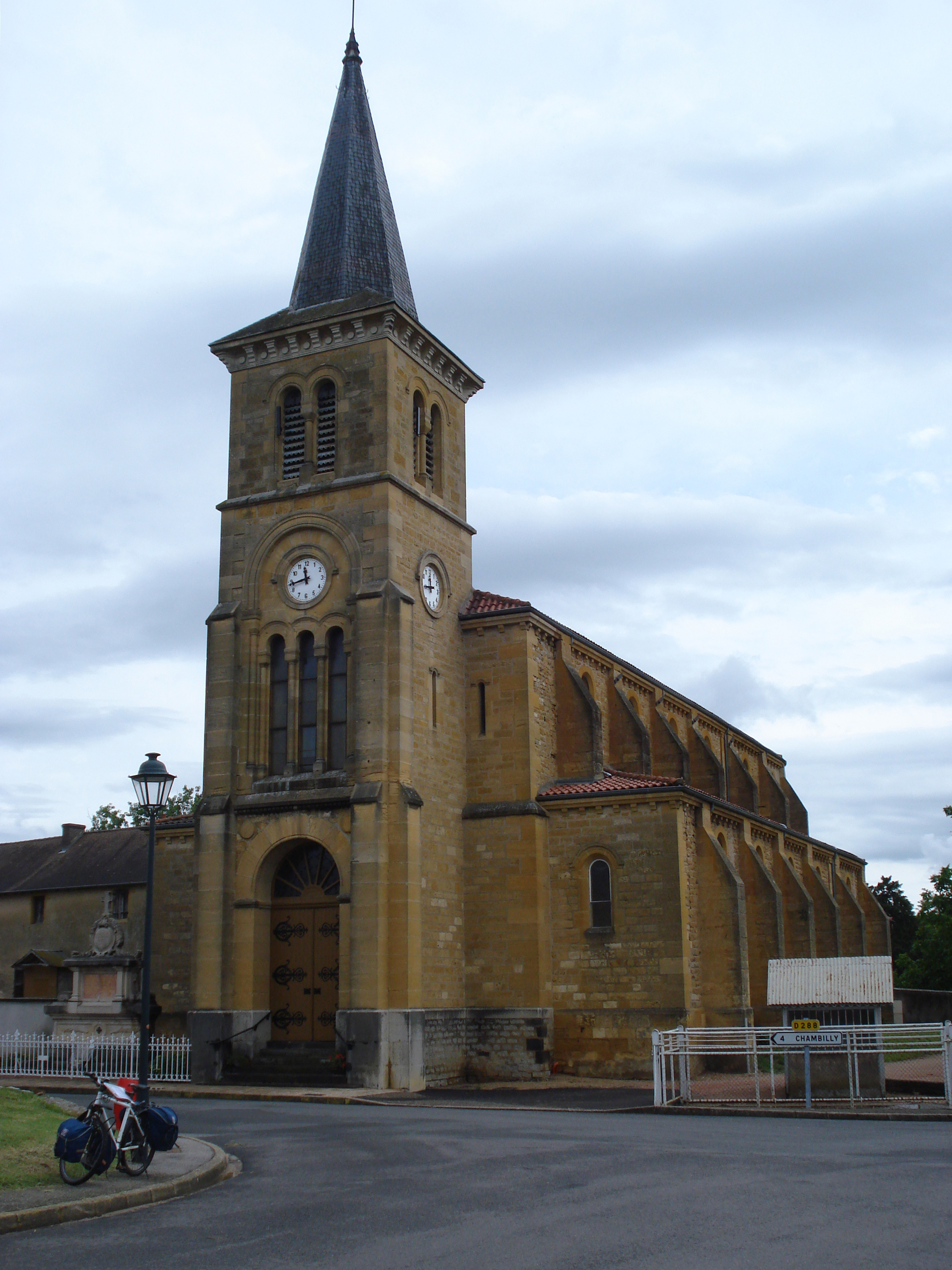
- Location of Artaix
- Location within France Location within Bourgogne-Franche-Comté
- Coordinates: 46°14′45″N 4°00′42″E
- Country: France
- Region: Bourgogne-Franche-Comté
- Department: Saône-et-Loire
- Arrondissement: Charolles
- Canton: Paray-le-Monial
- Intercommunality: CC Marcigny

Government
  - Mayor (2020–2026): Éric Nevers
- Area^{1}: 21.41 km^{2} (8.27 sq mi)
- Elevation: 264 m (866 ft)
- Highest elevation: 331 m (1,086 ft)
- Lowest elevation: 242 m (794 ft)
- Population (2023): 353
  - Density: 16.5/km^{2} (42.7/sq mi)
- Time zone: UTC+01:00 (CET)
  - Summer (DST): UTC+02:00 (CEST)
- INSEE/Postal code: 71012 /71110
- ^{1} French Land Register data, which excludes lakes, ponds, glaciers > 1 km^{2} (0.386 sq mi or 247 acres) and river estuaries.

Artaix is a commune in the department of Saône-et-Loire in the Bourgogne-Franche-Comté region in eastern France.

== Population ==
Historical population
Year	Pop.	±% p.a.
1968	523	—
1975	429	−2.79%
1982	416	−0.44%
1990	352	−2.07%
1999	336	−0.52%
2007	397	+2.11%
2012	354	−2.27%
2017	327	−1.57%
2023	353	+1.28%
Source: INSEE

== See also ==
- Communes of the Saône-et-Loire department
