= Baugy, Saône-et-Loire =

Baugy
- Commune
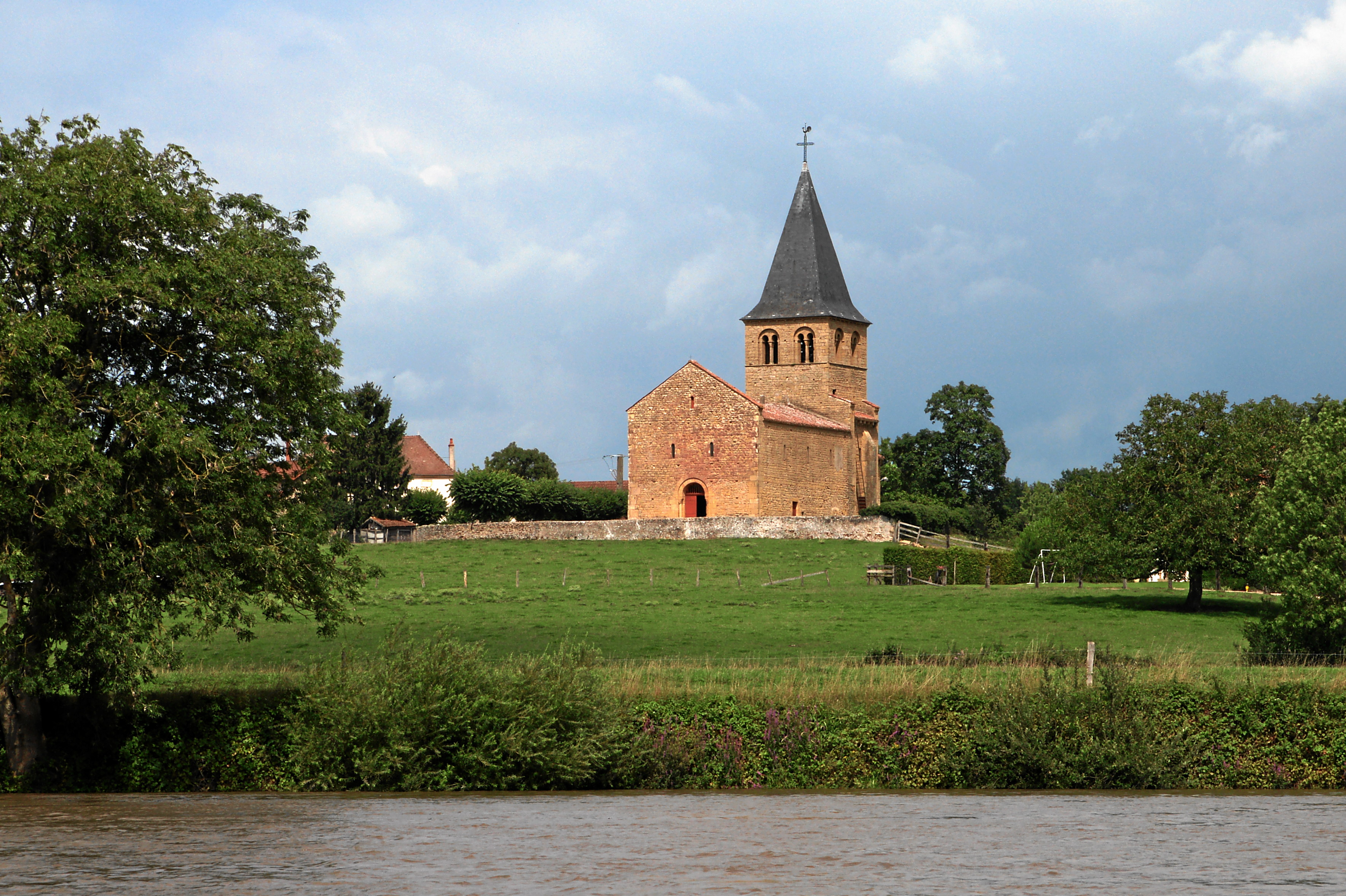
- Location of Baugy
- Location within France Location within Bourgogne-Franche-Comté
- Coordinates: 46°17′55″N 4°01′42″E
- Country: France
- Region: Bourgogne-Franche-Comté
- Department: Saône-et-Loire
- Arrondissement: Charolles
- Canton: Paray-le-Monial

Government
  - Mayor (2021–2026): Patrice Michaud
- Area^{1}: 12.61 km^{2} (4.87 sq mi)
- Elevation: 256 m (840 ft)
- Highest elevation: 304 m (997 ft)
- Lowest elevation: 238 m (781 ft)
- Population (2023): 499
  - Density: 39.6/km^{2} (102/sq mi)
- Time zone: UTC+01:00 (CET)
  - Summer (DST): UTC+02:00 (CEST)
- INSEE/Postal code: 71024 /71110
- ^{1} French Land Register data, which excludes lakes, ponds, glaciers > 1 km^{2} (0.386 sq mi or 247 acres) and river estuaries.

Baugy (French pronunciation: [boʒi]) is a commune in the Saône-et-Loire department in the region of Bourgogne-Franche-Comté in eastern France.

== Geography ==
The commune lies in the south of the department near Charolles.

== Population ==
Historical population
Year	Pop.	±% p.a.
1968	333	—
1975	360	+1.12%
1982	411	+1.91%
1990	458	+1.36%
1999	478	+0.48%
2007	486	+0.21%
2012	517	+1.24%
2017	503	−0.55%
2023	499	−0.13%
Source: INSEE

== See also ==
- Communes of the Saône-et-Loire department
