= Chenay-le-Châtel =

- Commune
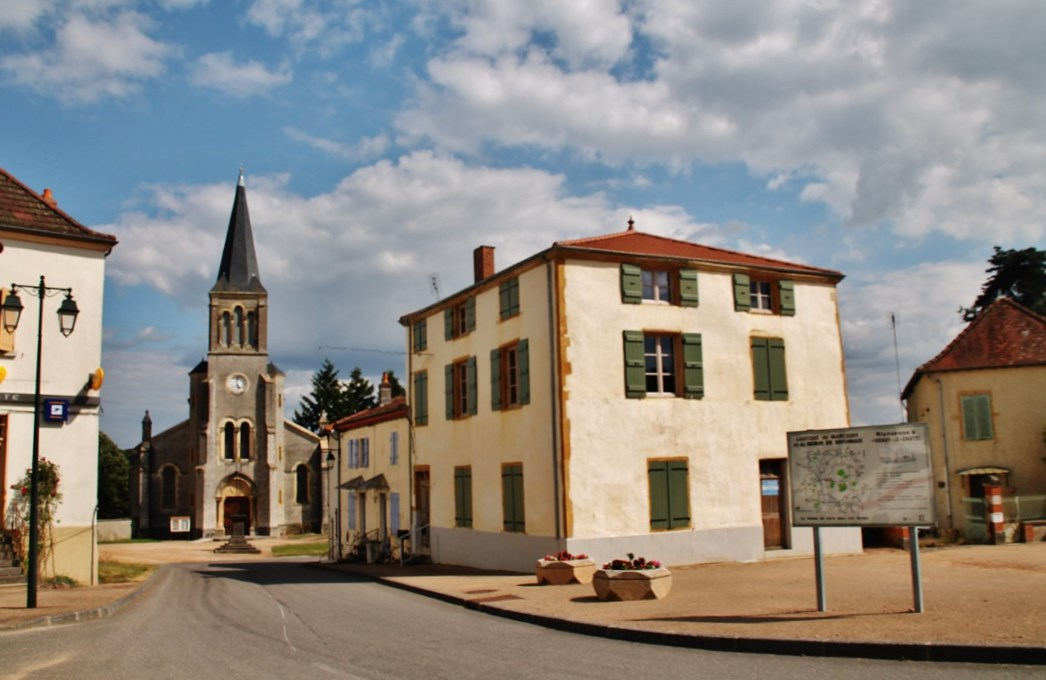
- The church and surroundings in Chenay-le-Châtel

- Coat of arms
- Location of Chenay-le-Châtel
- Location within France Location within Bourgogne-Franche-Comté
- Coordinates: 46°13′42″N 3°56′24″E
- Country: France
- Region: Bourgogne-Franche-Comté
- Department: Saône-et-Loire
- Arrondissement: Charolles
- Canton: Paray-le-Monial

Government
  - Mayor (2023–2026): Philippe Duplatre
- Area^{1}: 32.14 km^{2} (12.41 sq mi)
- Elevation: 310 m (1,020 ft)
- Highest elevation: 344 m (1,129 ft)
- Lowest elevation: 267 m (876 ft)
- Population (2023): 375
  - Density: 11.7/km^{2} (30.2/sq mi)
- Time zone: UTC+01:00 (CET)
  - Summer (DST): UTC+02:00 (CEST)
- INSEE/Postal code: 71123 /71340
- ^{1} French Land Register data, which excludes lakes, ponds, glaciers > 1 km^{2} (0.386 sq mi or 247 acres) and river estuaries.

Chenay-le-Châtel (French pronunciation: [ʃənɛ lə ʃatɛl]) is a commune in the Saône-et-Loire department in the region of Bourgogne-Franche-Comté in eastern France.

== See also ==
- Communes of the Saône-et-Loire department
