= Château de Nobles =

Castle in France

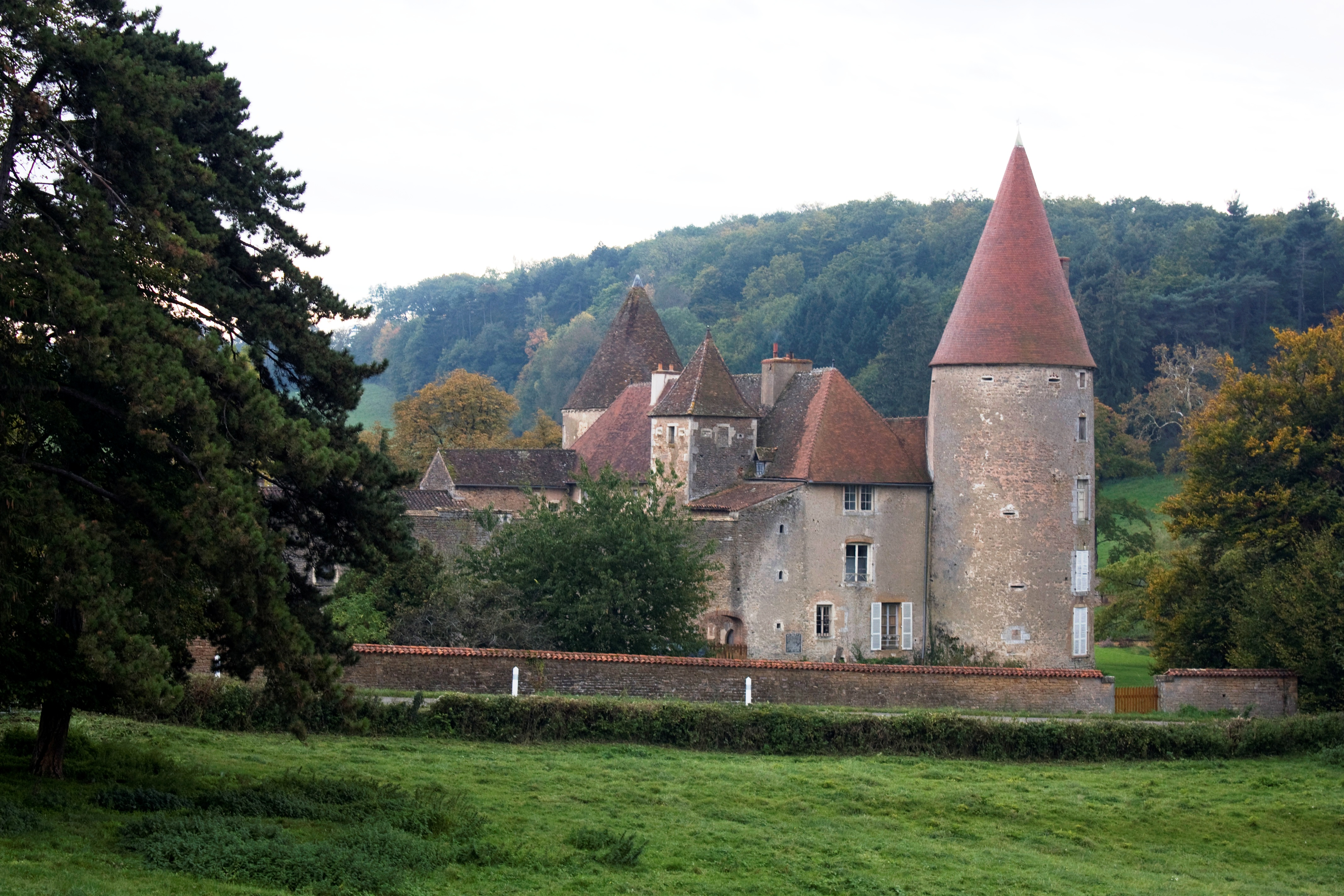
- Château de Nobles

- Location within France
- 46°32′29″N 4°47′09″E

History
- Built: 12th century
- Original use: Castle

Site notes
- Architectural style: Renaissance
- Current use: Private residence

Monument historique
- Designated: 1946

The Château de Nobles is a castle in the French commune of La Chapelle-sous-Brancion, in the department of Saône-et-Loire. The castle is privately owned and is not open to the public. It has been listed since 1946 as a monument historique by the French Ministry of Culture.

== History ==
Arms of the Nantons

- 1370 : Antoine de Nanton, who belonged to a Mâcon family, was the first lord known in the area.
- End of 16th century : Philiberte de Feurs, widow of François de Nanton, the last of his line, took the manor on remarriage to Jean de La Baume whose family held the property until the end of the Ancien Régime.
- Revolution : the castle was looted and partially destroyed.
- 1856 : during restoration work, what was left of the fortifications was demolished.

== Description ==
The castle was built on a slope. The construction consists of a long rectangular building flanked at either end by towers with conical roofs. The latter are pierced with holes for cannon in the upper parts. The rear façade of the building, flanked with a square tower, opens into a courtyard containing various agricultural outbuildings. On the ground floor, two doors are witness to the alterations carried out in the 16th century: one, fully arched, is installed in a Tuscan bay with fluted pilasters; the other, rectangular, is endowed with a frame, probably altered, consisting of two short pilasters with composite capitals whose shafts are sculpted with scales and which carry an entablature divided into coffers.

In one of the first floor rooms is a monumental chimney place whose lintel, decorated with an oval medallion surrounded with hides and rose windows, is supported by four fluted columns with Ionic capitals.

== See also ==
- List of castles in France

== Bibliography ==
- Vignier, Françoise (ed.) : Le Guide des Châteaux de France, 71 Saône-et-Loire, Editions Hermé, Paris (1985)
