= La Chapelle-sous-Brancion =

- Commune
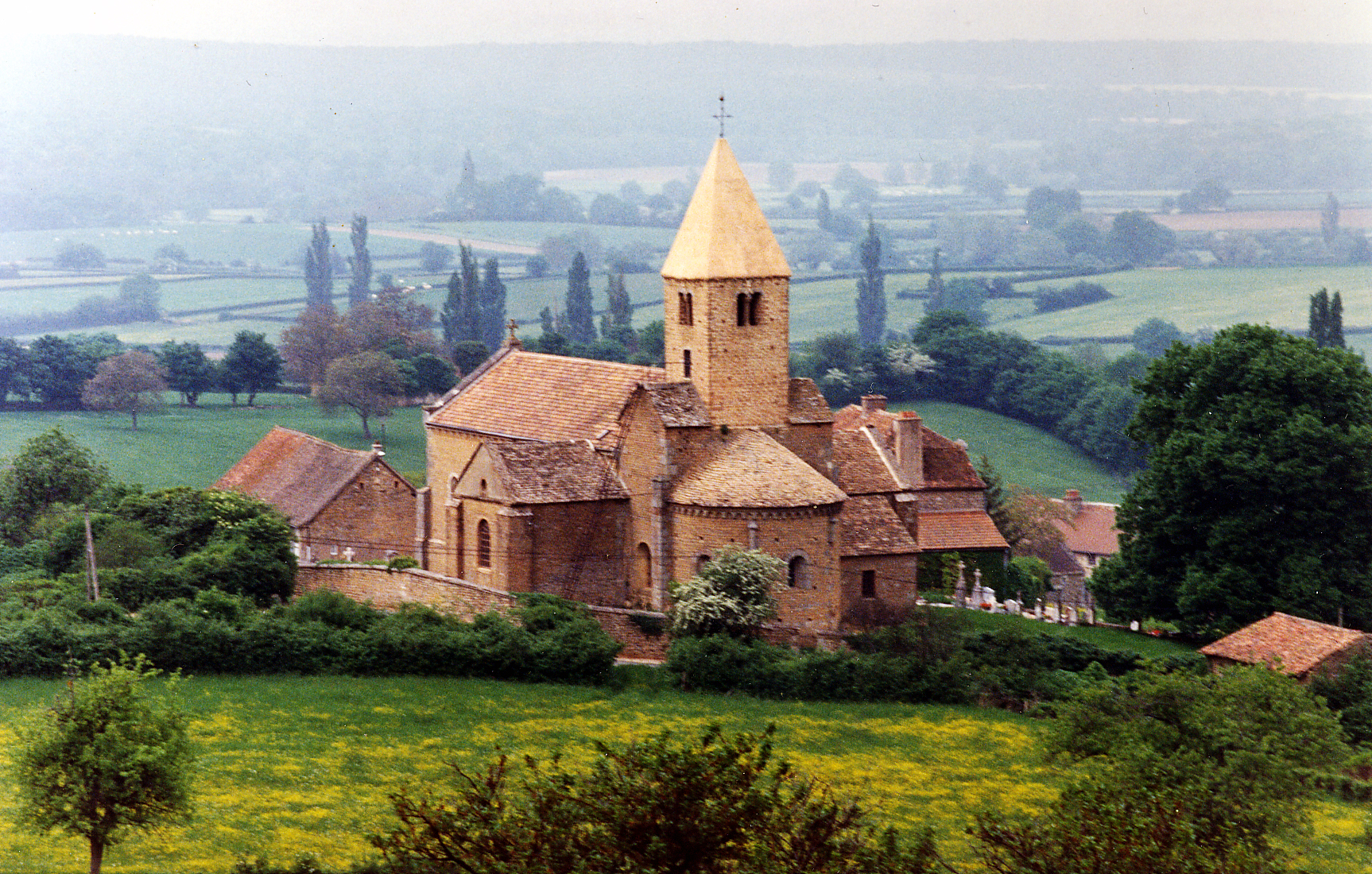
- The church in La Chapelle-sous-Brancion
- Location of La Chapelle-sous-Brancion
- Location within France Location within Bourgogne-Franche-Comté
- Coordinates: 46°33′07″N 4°47′34″E
- Country: France
- Region: Bourgogne-Franche-Comté
- Department: Saône-et-Loire
- Arrondissement: Mâcon
- Canton: Tournus
- Intercommunality: Mâconnais - Tournugeois

Government
  - Mayor (2020–2026): Pierre-Michel Delpeuch
- Area^{1}: 9.94 km^{2} (3.84 sq mi)
- Elevation: 280 m (920 ft)
- Highest elevation: 415 m (1,362 ft)
- Lowest elevation: 202 m (663 ft)
- Population (2023): 145
  - Density: 14.6/km^{2} (37.8/sq mi)
- Time zone: UTC+01:00 (CET)
  - Summer (DST): UTC+02:00 (CEST)
- INSEE/Postal code: 71094 /71700
- ^{1} French Land Register data, which excludes lakes, ponds, glaciers > 1 km^{2} (0.386 sq mi or 247 acres) and river estuaries.

La Chapelle-sous-Brancion (French pronunciation: [la ʃapɛl su bʁɑ̃sjɔ̃]) is a commune in the eastern French department of Saône-et-Loire.

== Sites and monuments ==
- Château de Nobles

== See also ==
- Communes of the Saône-et-Loire department
