= Bouhans =

- Commune
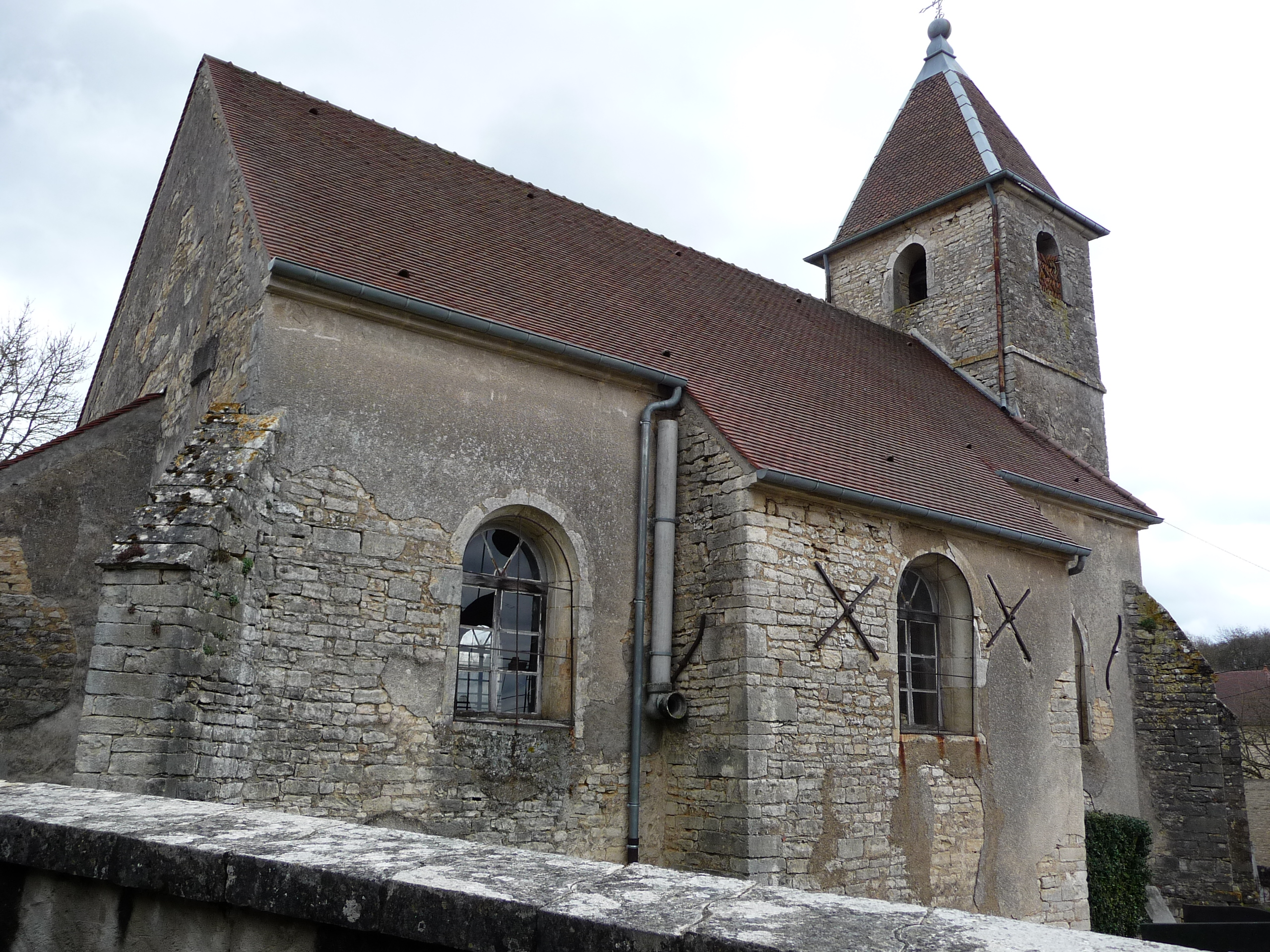
- The church in Bouhans
- Location of Bouhans
- Location within France Location within Bourgogne-Franche-Comté
- Coordinates: 46°46′26″N 5°17′45″E
- Country: France
- Region: Bourgogne-Franche-Comté
- Department: Saône-et-Loire
- Arrondissement: Louhans
- Canton: Pierre-de-Bresse

Government
  - Mayor (2020–2026): Pierre Bousquet
- Area^{1}: 10.21 km^{2} (3.94 sq mi)
- Elevation: 200 m (660 ft)
- Highest elevation: 207 m (679 ft)
- Lowest elevation: 181 m (594 ft)
- Population (2023): 174
  - Density: 17.0/km^{2} (44.1/sq mi)
- Time zone: UTC+01:00 (CET)
  - Summer (DST): UTC+02:00 (CEST)
- INSEE/Postal code: 71045 /71330
- ^{1} French Land Register data, which excludes lakes, ponds, glaciers > 1 km^{2} (0.386 sq mi or 247 acres) and river estuaries.

Bouhans (French pronunciation: [bu.ɑ̃]) is a commune in the Saône-et-Loire department in the region of Bourgogne-Franche-Comté in eastern France.

== Politics ==
List of successive mayors
Period		Name
March 1989	March 2008	Gérard Desbois
March 2008	March 2014	Éric Fèvre
March 2014	May 2020	Daniel Michelin
May 2020	Current	Pierre Bousquet

== See also ==
- Communes of the Saône-et-Loire department
