= Bellevesvre =

- Commune
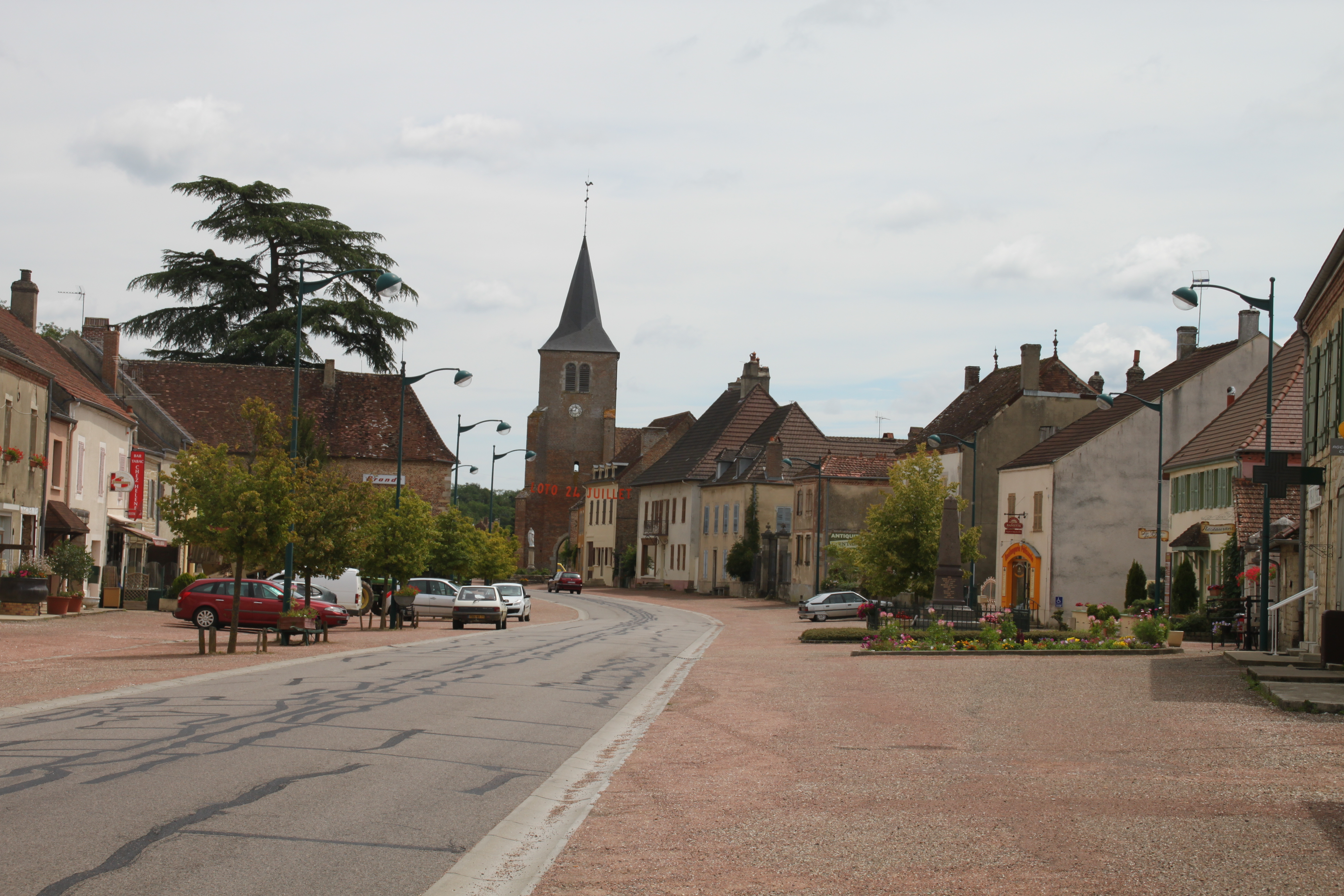

- Coat of arms
- Location of Bellevesvre
- Location within France Location within Bourgogne-Franche-Comté
- Coordinates: 46°50′31″N 5°21′54″E
- Country: France
- Region: Bourgogne-Franche-Comté
- Department: Saône-et-Loire
- Arrondissement: Louhans
- Canton: Pierre-de-Bresse

Government
  - Mayor (2020–2026): Jean-Luc Canet
- Area^{1}: 7.13 km^{2} (2.75 sq mi)
- Elevation: 188 m (617 ft)
- Highest elevation: 213 m (699 ft)
- Lowest elevation: 185 m (607 ft)
- Population (2023): 315
  - Density: 44.2/km^{2} (114/sq mi)
- Time zone: UTC+01:00 (CET)
  - Summer (DST): UTC+02:00 (CEST)
- INSEE/Postal code: 71029 /71270
- ^{1} French Land Register data, which excludes lakes, ponds, glaciers > 1 km^{2} (0.386 sq mi or 247 acres) and river estuaries.

Bellevesvre (French pronunciation: [bɛlvɛvʁ]) is a commune in the Saône-et-Loire department in the region of Bourgogne-Franche-Comté in eastern France.

== Population ==
Historical population
Year	Pop.	±% p.a.
1968	396	—
1975	343	−2.03%
1982	308	−1.53%
1990	281	−1.14%
1999	246	−1.47%
2007	274	+1.36%
2012	273	−0.07%
2017	282	+0.65%
2023	315	+1.86%
Source: INSEE

== See also ==
- Communes of the Saône-et-Loire department
