= Saillenard =

- Commune
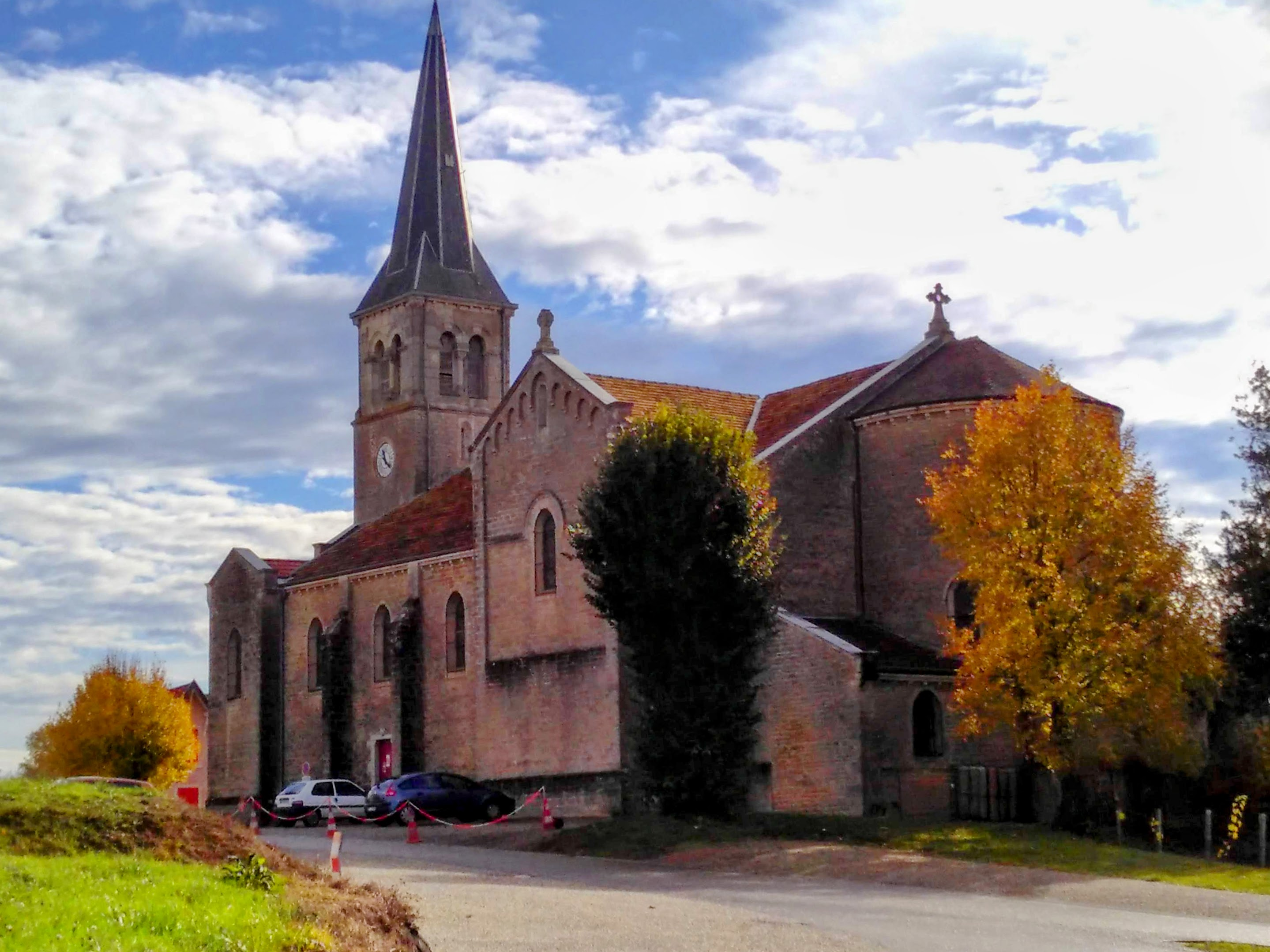
- The church in Saillenard
- Location of Saillenard
- Location within France Location within Bourgogne-Franche-Comté
- Coordinates: 46°41′29″N 5°22′23″E
- Country: France
- Region: Bourgogne-Franche-Comté
- Department: Saône-et-Loire
- Arrondissement: Louhans
- Canton: Pierre-de-Bresse
- Area^{1}: 17.88 km^{2} (6.90 sq mi)
- Elevation: 203 m (666 ft)
- Highest elevation: 218 m (715 ft)
- Lowest elevation: 189 m (620 ft)
- Population (2023): 830
  - Density: 46/km^{2} (120/sq mi)
- Time zone: UTC+01:00 (CET)
  - Summer (DST): UTC+02:00 (CEST)
- INSEE/Postal code: 71380 /71580
- ^{1} French Land Register data, which excludes lakes, ponds, glaciers > 1 km^{2} (0.386 sq mi or 247 acres) and river estuaries.

Saillenard (French pronunciation: [sajnaʁ]) is a commune in the Saône-et-Loire department in the region of Bourgogne-Franche-Comté in eastern France.

== See also ==
- Communes of the Saône-et-Loire department
