= Serley =

- Commune
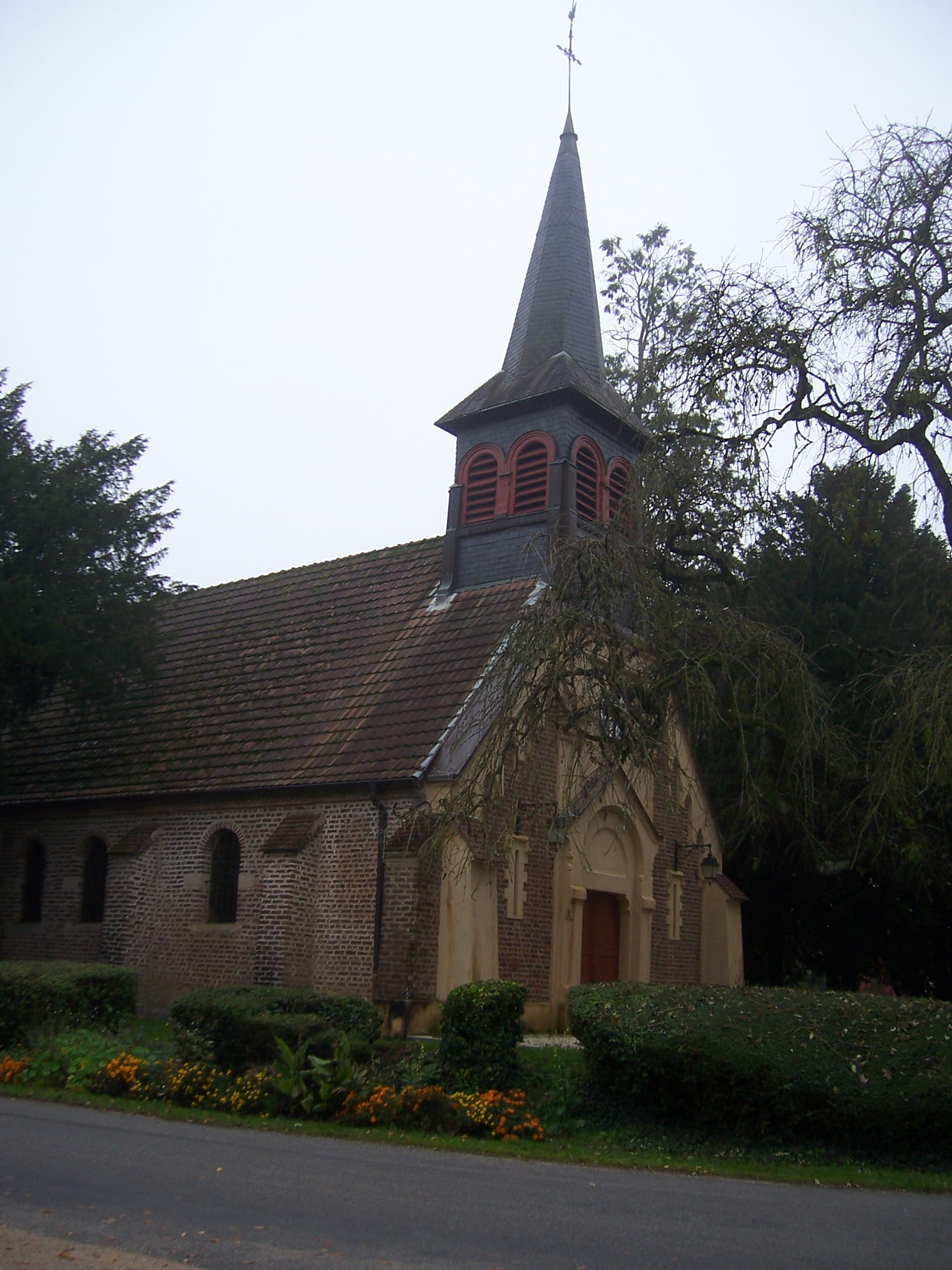
- The church in Serley

- Coat of arms
- Location of Serley
- Location within France Location within Bourgogne-Franche-Comté
- Coordinates: 46°47′01″N 5°13′04″E
- Country: France
- Region: Bourgogne-Franche-Comté
- Department: Saône-et-Loire
- Arrondissement: Louhans
- Canton: Pierre-de-Bresse

Government
  - Mayor (2022–2026): Nicolas Vilain
- Area^{1}: 22.6 km^{2} (8.7 sq mi)
- Elevation: 200 m (660 ft)
- Highest elevation: 214 m (702 ft)
- Lowest elevation: 187 m (614 ft)
- Population (2023): 600
  - Density: 27/km^{2} (69/sq mi)
- Time zone: UTC+01:00 (CET)
  - Summer (DST): UTC+02:00 (CEST)
- INSEE/Postal code: 71516 /71310
- ^{1} French Land Register data, which excludes lakes, ponds, glaciers > 1 km^{2} (0.386 sq mi or 247 acres) and river estuaries.

Serley (French pronunciation: [sɛʁlɛ]) is a commune in the Saône-et-Loire department in the region of Bourgogne-Franche-Comté in eastern France.

== See also ==
- Communes of the Saône-et-Loire department
