= Authumes =

- Commune
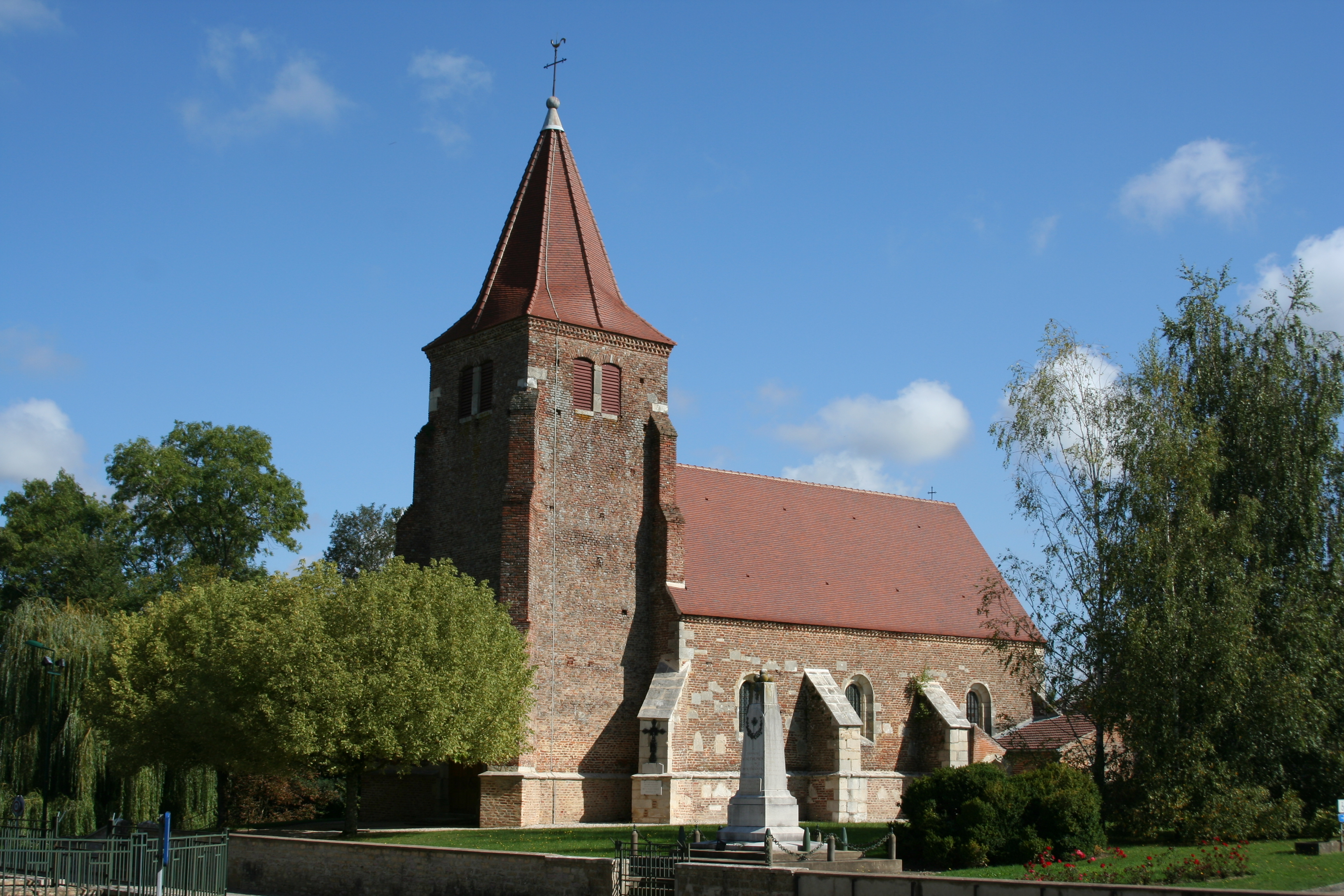
- Location of Authumes
- Location within France Location within Bourgogne-Franche-Comté
- Coordinates: 46°53′25″N 5°18′11″E
- Country: France
- Region: Bourgogne-Franche-Comté
- Department: Saône-et-Loire
- Arrondissement: Louhans
- Canton: Pierre-de-Bresse
- Intercommunality: Bresse Nord Intercom

Government
  - Mayor (2026 - 2032): Eleonore COUVENT
- Area^{1}: 12.88 km^{2} (4.97 sq mi)
- Elevation: 211 m (692 ft)
- Highest elevation: 213 m (699 ft)
- Lowest elevation: 180 m (590 ft)
- Population (2023): 285
  - Density: 22.1/km^{2} (57.3/sq mi)
- Time zone: UTC+01:00 (CET)
  - Summer (DST): UTC+02:00 (CEST)
- INSEE/Postal code: 71013 /71270
- ^{1} French Land Register data, which excludes lakes, ponds, glaciers > 1 km^{2} (0.386 sq mi or 247 acres) and river estuaries.

Authumes (French pronunciation: [otym]) is a commune in the Saône-et-Loire department in the Bourgogne-Franche-Comté region in eastern France.

== Geography ==
The commune lies on the plain of Bresse in the east of the department.

== Population ==
Historical population
Year	Pop.	±% p.a.
1968	306	—
1975	304	−0.09%
1982	250	−2.76%
1990	209	−2.21%
1999	199	−0.54%
2007	213	+0.85%
2012	264	+4.39%
2017	252	−0.93%
2023	285	+2.07%
Source: INSEE

== See also ==
- Communes of the Saône-et-Loire department
