= Saint-Germain-du-Bois =

- Commune
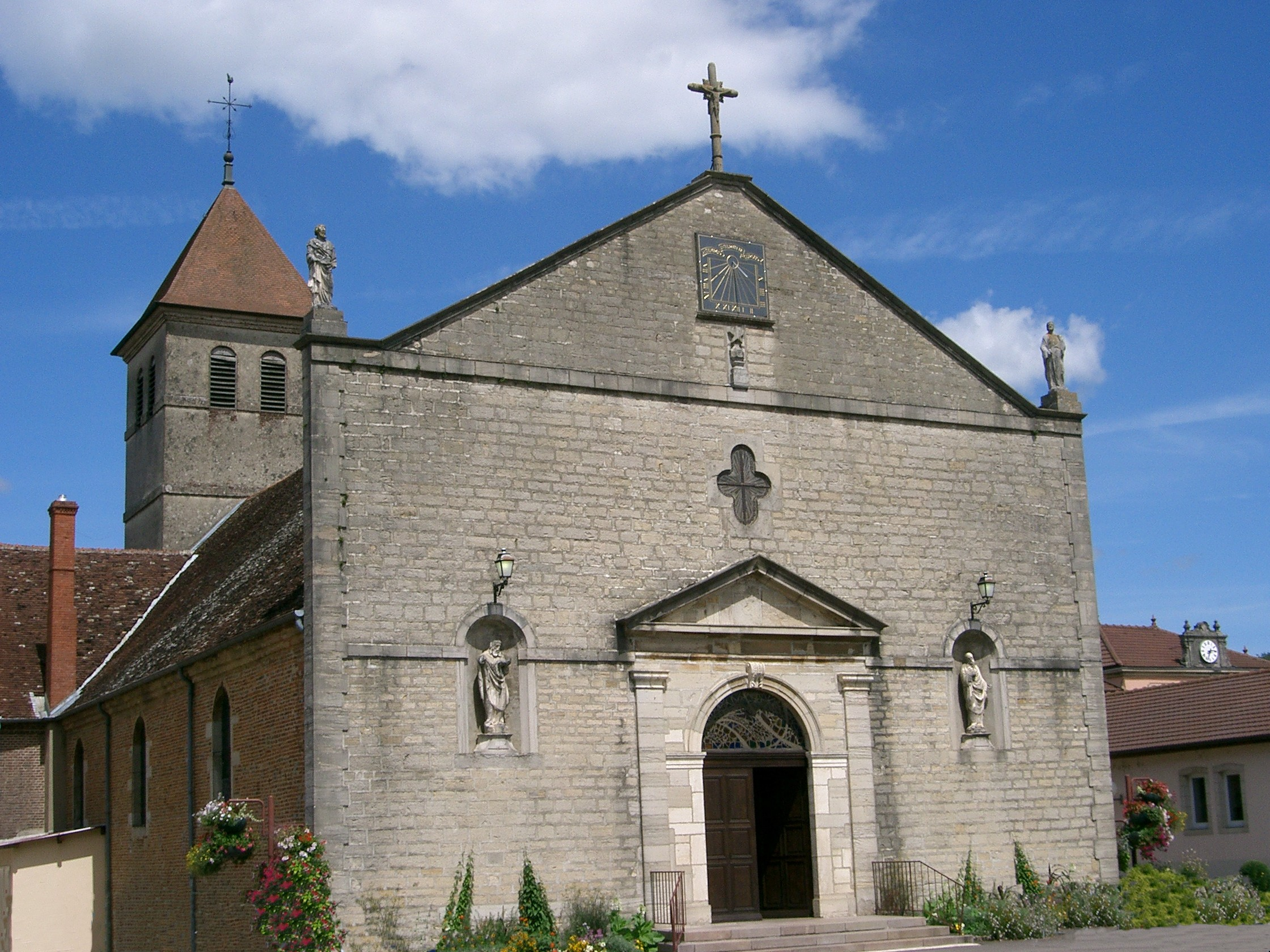
- The church in Saint-Germain-du-Bois

- Coat of arms
- Location of Saint-Germain-du-Bois
- Location within France Location within Bourgogne-Franche-Comté
- Coordinates: 46°45′13″N 5°14′36″E
- Country: France
- Region: Bourgogne-Franche-Comté
- Department: Saône-et-Loire
- Arrondissement: Louhans
- Canton: Pierre-de-Bresse
- Area^{1}: 30.33 km^{2} (11.71 sq mi)
- Elevation: 208 m (682 ft)
- Highest elevation: 213 m (699 ft)
- Lowest elevation: 180 m (590 ft)
- Population (2023): 1,977
  - Density: 65.18/km^{2} (168.8/sq mi)
- Time zone: UTC+01:00 (CET)
  - Summer (DST): UTC+02:00 (CEST)
- INSEE/Postal code: 71419 /71330
- ^{1} French Land Register data, which excludes lakes, ponds, glaciers > 1 km^{2} (0.386 sq mi or 247 acres) and river estuaries.

Saint-Germain-du-Bois is a commune in the Saône-et-Loire department in the region of Bourgogne-Franche-Comté in eastern France.

== See also ==
- Communes of the Saône-et-Loire department
