= Dampierre-en-Bresse =

- Commune
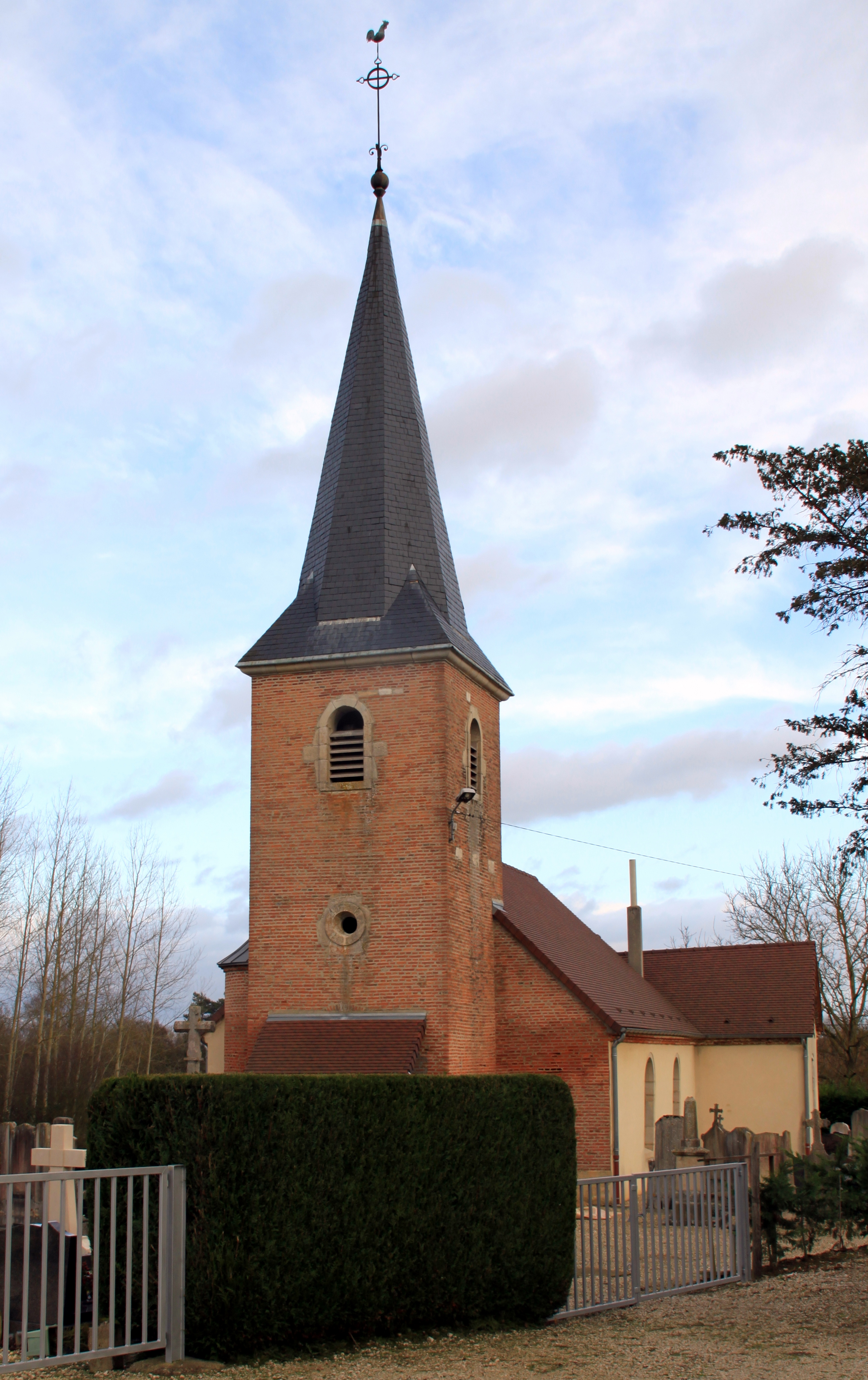
- The church in Dampierre-en-Bresse

- Coat of arms
- Location of Dampierre-en-Bresse
- Location within France Location within Bourgogne-Franche-Comté
- Coordinates: 46°49′40″N 5°11′58″E
- Country: France
- Region: Bourgogne-Franche-Comté
- Department: Saône-et-Loire
- Arrondissement: Louhans
- Canton: Pierre-de-Bresse
- Area^{1}: 11.09 km^{2} (4.28 sq mi)
- Elevation: 200 m (660 ft)
- Highest elevation: 214 m (702 ft)
- Lowest elevation: 181 m (594 ft)
- Population (2023): 172
  - Density: 15.5/km^{2} (40.2/sq mi)
- Time zone: UTC+01:00 (CET)
  - Summer (DST): UTC+02:00 (CEST)
- INSEE/Postal code: 71168 /71310
- ^{1} French Land Register data, which excludes lakes, ponds, glaciers > 1 km^{2} (0.386 sq mi or 247 acres) and river estuaries.

Dampierre-en-Bresse (French pronunciation: [dɑ̃pjɛʁ ɑ̃ bʁɛs], literally Dampierre in Bresse) is a commune in the Saône-et-Loire department of the region of Bourgogne-Franche-Comté in eastern France.

== Demography ==
Historical population
Year	Pop.	±% p.a.
1968	247	—
1975	215	−1.96%
1982	184	−2.20%
1990	157	−1.96%
1999	131	−1.99%
2007	157	+2.29%
2012	174	+2.08%
2017	171	−0.35%
2023	172	+0.10%
Source: INSEE

== See also ==
- Communes of the Saône-et-Loire department
