= Lays-sur-le-Doubs =

- Commune
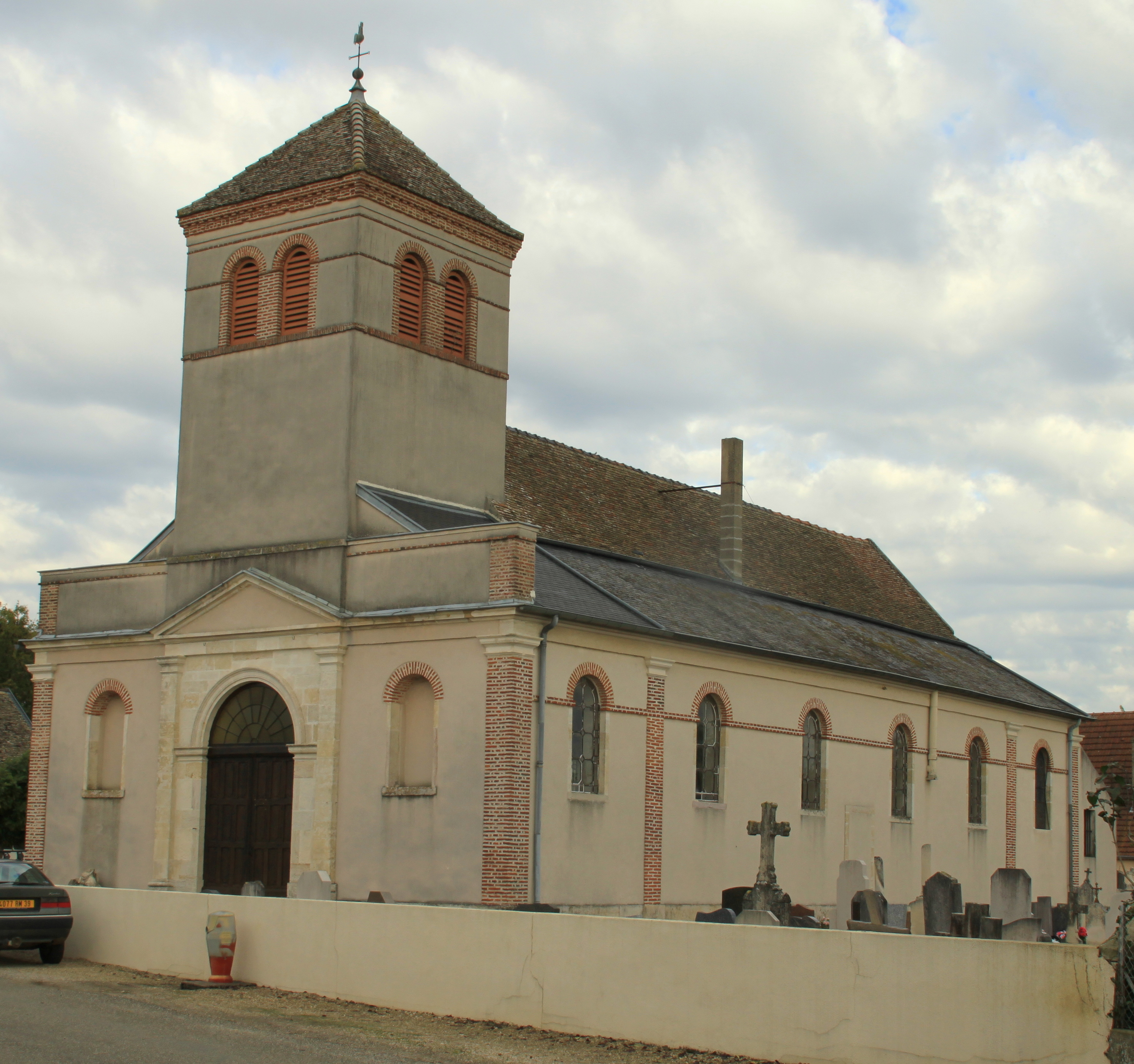
- The church in Lays-sur-le-Doubs
- Location of Lays-sur-le-Doubs
- Location within France Location within Bourgogne-Franche-Comté
- Coordinates: 46°55′21″N 5°14′51″E
- Country: France
- Region: Bourgogne-Franche-Comté
- Department: Saône-et-Loire
- Arrondissement: Louhans
- Canton: Pierre-de-Bresse
- Area^{1}: 10.38 km^{2} (4.01 sq mi)
- Elevation: 180 m (590 ft)
- Highest elevation: 182 m (597 ft)
- Lowest elevation: 177 m (581 ft)
- Population (2023): 164
  - Density: 15.8/km^{2} (40.9/sq mi)
- Time zone: UTC+01:00 (CET)
  - Summer (DST): UTC+02:00 (CEST)
- INSEE/Postal code: 71254 /71270
- ^{1} French Land Register data, which excludes lakes, ponds, glaciers > 1 km^{2} (0.386 sq mi or 247 acres) and river estuaries.

Lays-sur-le-Doubs is a commune in the Saône-et-Loire department in the region of Bourgogne-Franche-Comté in eastern France.

== See also ==
- Communes of the Saône-et-Loire department
