= Mouthier-en-Bresse =

- Commune
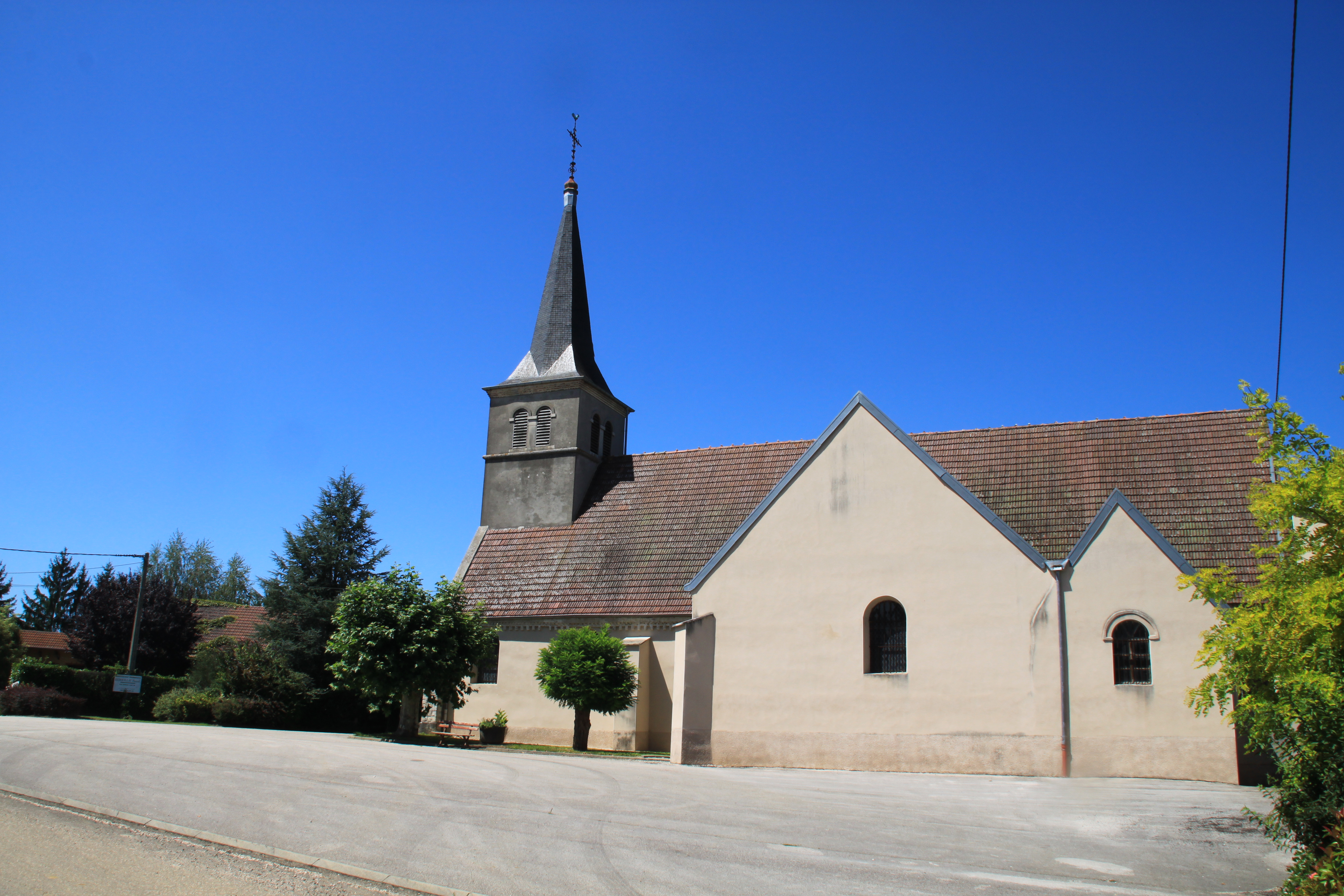
- The church in Mouthier-en-Bresse
- Location of Mouthier-en-Bresse
- Location within France Location within Bourgogne-Franche-Comté
- Coordinates: 46°51′34″N 5°23′20″E
- Country: France
- Region: Bourgogne-Franche-Comté
- Department: Saône-et-Loire
- Arrondissement: Louhans
- Canton: Pierre-de-Bresse
- Area^{1}: 30.32 km^{2} (11.71 sq mi)
- Elevation: 200 m (660 ft)
- Highest elevation: 217 m (712 ft)
- Lowest elevation: 187 m (614 ft)
- Population (2023): 450
  - Density: 15/km^{2} (38/sq mi)
- Time zone: UTC+01:00 (CET)
  - Summer (DST): UTC+02:00 (CEST)
- INSEE/Postal code: 71326 /71270
- ^{1} French Land Register data, which excludes lakes, ponds, glaciers > 1 km^{2} (0.386 sq mi or 247 acres) and river estuaries.

Mouthier-en-Bresse (French pronunciation: [mutje ɑ̃ bʁɛs], literally Mouthier in Bresse) is a commune in the Saône-et-Loire department in the region of Bourgogne-Franche-Comté in eastern France.

== See also ==
- Communes of the Saône-et-Loire department
