= Canton of Pierre-de-Bresse =

Coordinates: 46.88°N 5.26°E

The canton of Pierre-de-Bresse is an administrative division of the Saône-et-Loire department, eastern France. Its borders were modified at the French canton reorganisation which came into effect in March 2015. Its seat is in Pierre-de-Bresse.

It consists of the following communes:

1. Authumes
2. Beaurepaire-en-Bresse
3. Beauvernois
4. Bellevesvre
5. Bosjean
6. Bouhans
7. La Chapelle-Saint-Sauveur
8. Charette-Varennes
9. La Chaux
10. Dampierre-en-Bresse
11. Devrouze
12. Diconne
13. Frangy-en-Bresse
14. Fretterans
15. Frontenard
16. Lays-sur-le-Doubs
17. Mervans
18. Montjay
19. Mouthier-en-Bresse
20. Pierre-de-Bresse
21. Le Planois
22. Pourlans
23. La Racineuse
24. Saillenard
25. Saint-Bonnet-en-Bresse
26. Saint-Germain-du-Bois
27. Savigny-en-Revermont
28. Sens-sur-Seille
29. Serley
30. Serrigny-en-Bresse
31. Le Tartre
32. Thurey
33. Torpes
