= Frontenard =

- Commune
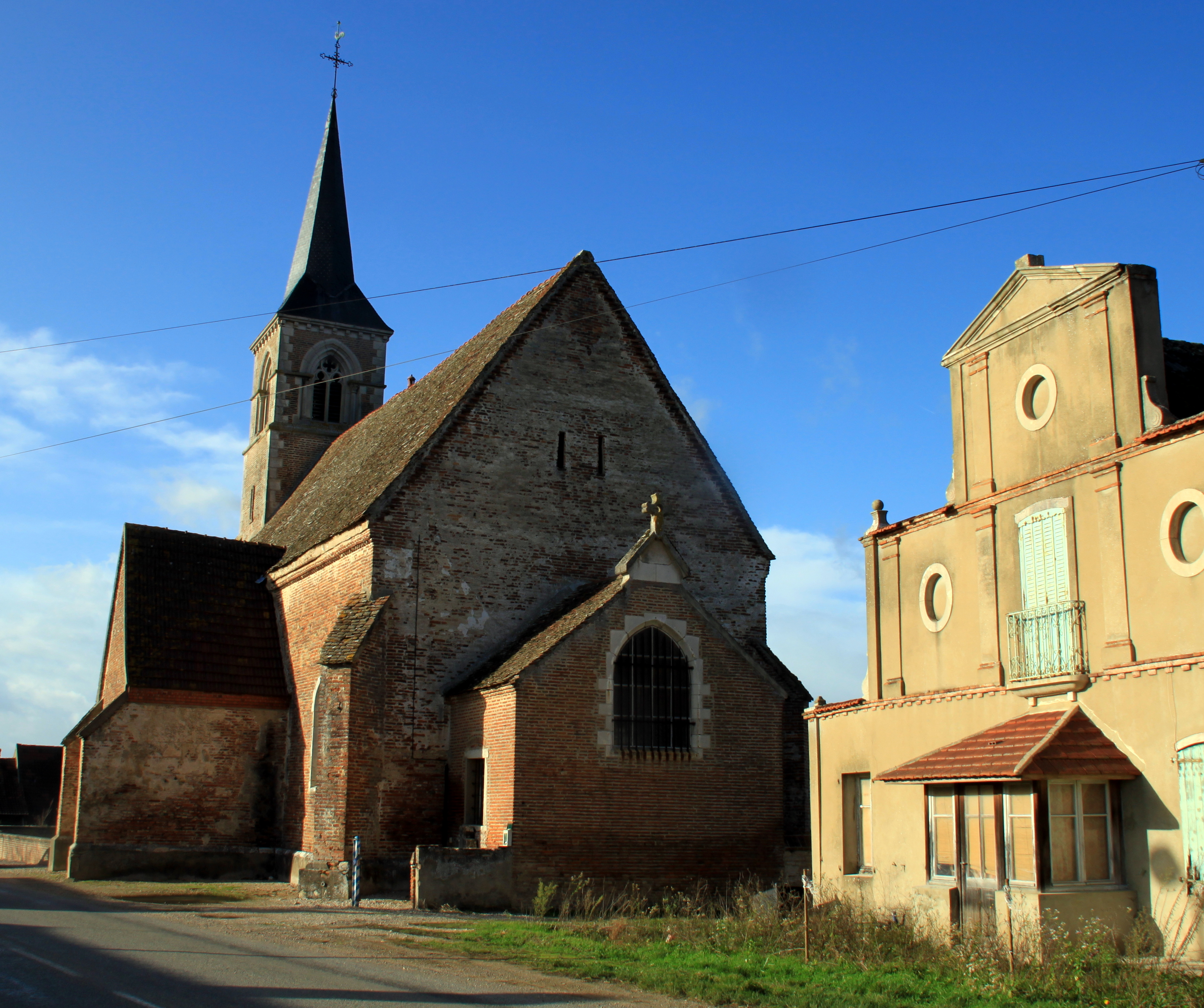
- The church in Frontenard
- Location of Frontenard
- Location within France Location within Bourgogne-Franche-Comté
- Coordinates: 46°54′49″N 5°09′30″E
- Country: France
- Region: Bourgogne-Franche-Comté
- Department: Saône-et-Loire
- Arrondissement: Louhans
- Canton: Pierre-de-Bresse
- Area^{1}: 12.31 km^{2} (4.75 sq mi)
- Elevation: 181 m (594 ft)
- Highest elevation: 193 m (633 ft)
- Lowest elevation: 175 m (574 ft)
- Population (2023): 212
  - Density: 17.2/km^{2} (44.6/sq mi)
- Time zone: UTC+01:00 (CET)
  - Summer (DST): UTC+02:00 (CEST)
- INSEE/Postal code: 71208 /71270
- ^{1} French Land Register data, which excludes lakes, ponds, glaciers > 1 km^{2} (0.386 sq mi or 247 acres) and river estuaries.

Frontenard (French pronunciation: [fʁɔ̃tnaʁ]) is a commune in the Saône-et-Loire department in the region of Bourgogne-Franche-Comté in eastern France.

== See also ==
- Communes of the Saône-et-Loire department
