= La Racineuse =

- Commune
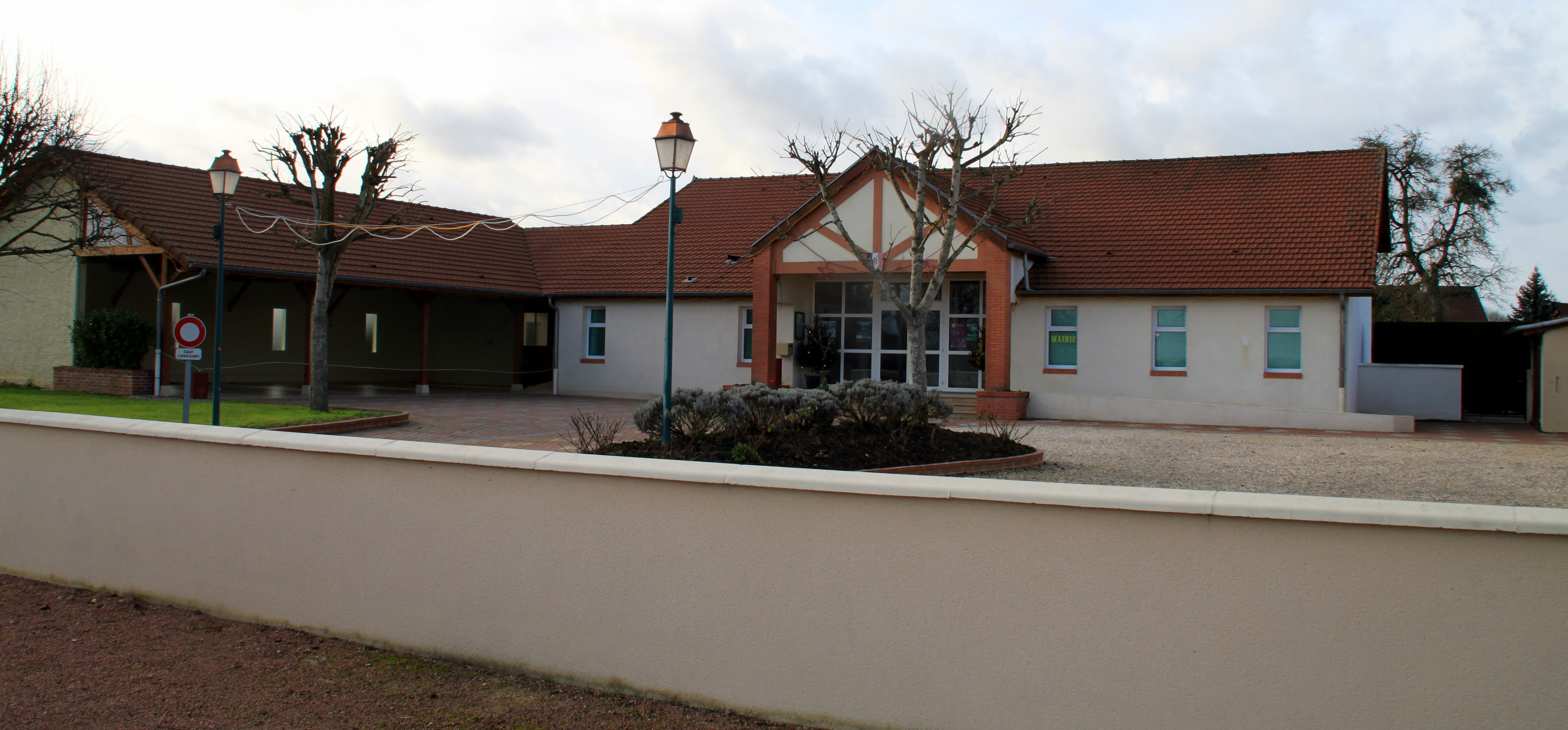
- The town hall in La Racineuse
- Location of La Racineuse
- Location within France Location within Bourgogne-Franche-Comté
- Coordinates: 46°50′00″N 5°09′23″E
- Country: France
- Region: Bourgogne-Franche-Comté
- Department: Saône-et-Loire
- Arrondissement: Louhans
- Canton: Pierre-de-Bresse
- Area^{1}: 7.11 km^{2} (2.75 sq mi)
- Elevation: 191 m (627 ft)
- Highest elevation: 197 m (646 ft)
- Lowest elevation: 182 m (597 ft)
- Population (2023): 177
  - Density: 24.9/km^{2} (64.5/sq mi)
- Time zone: UTC+01:00 (CET)
  - Summer (DST): UTC+02:00 (CEST)
- INSEE/Postal code: 71364 /71310
- ^{1} French Land Register data, which excludes lakes, ponds, glaciers > 1 km^{2} (0.386 sq mi or 247 acres) and river estuaries.

La Racineuse (French pronunciation: [la ʁasinøz]) is a commune in the Saône-et-Loire department in the region of Bourgogne-Franche-Comté in eastern France.

== See also ==
- Communes of the Saône-et-Loire department
