= Serrigny-en-Bresse =

- Commune
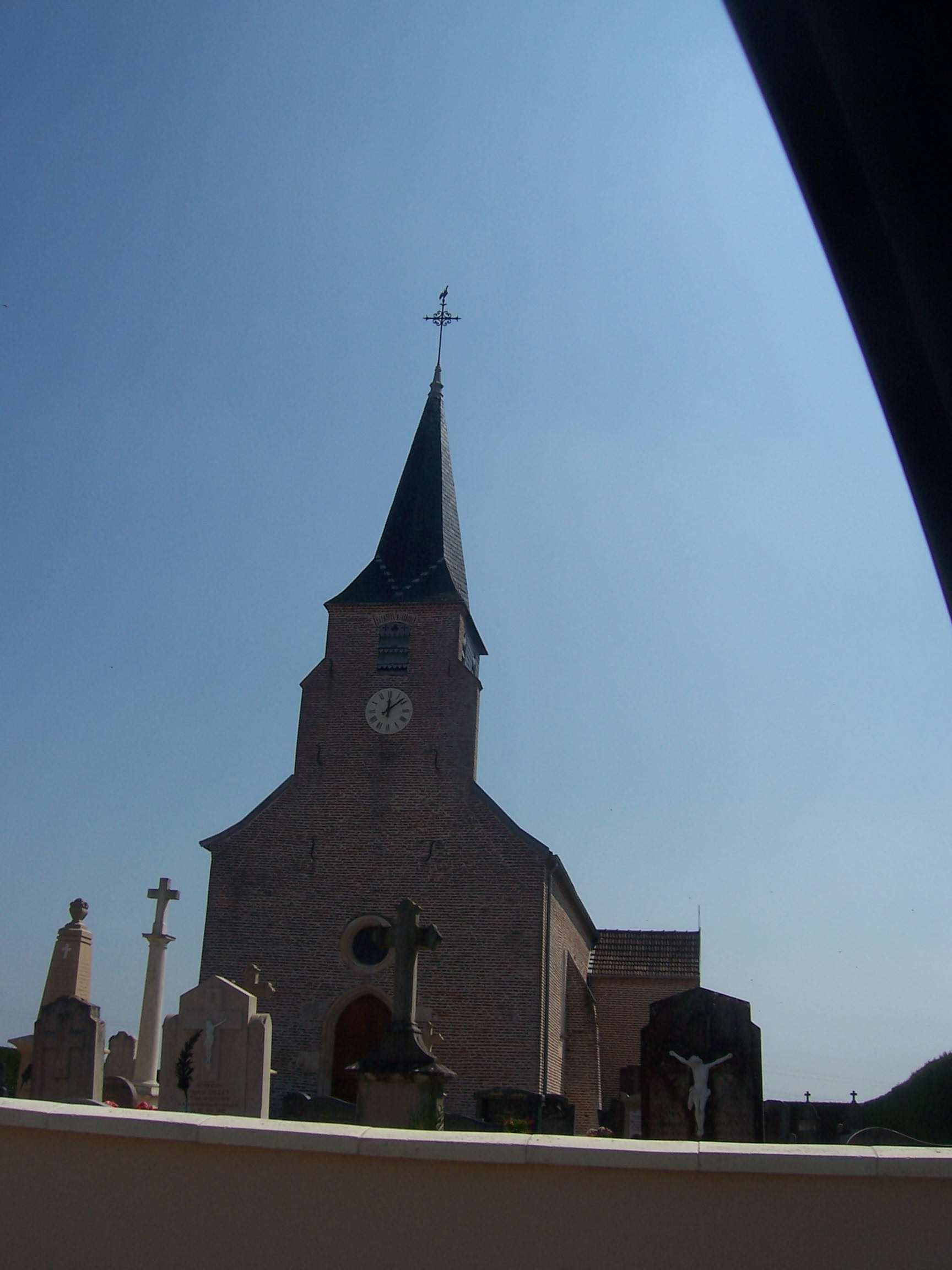
- The church in Serrigny-en-Bresse
- Location of Serrigny-en-Bresse
- Location within France Location within Bourgogne-Franche-Comté
- Coordinates: 46°49′06″N 5°07′08″E
- Country: France
- Region: Bourgogne-Franche-Comté
- Department: Saône-et-Loire
- Arrondissement: Louhans
- Canton: Pierre-de-Bresse
- Area^{1}: 12.36 km^{2} (4.77 sq mi)
- Elevation: 195 m (640 ft)
- Highest elevation: 204 m (669 ft)
- Lowest elevation: 182 m (597 ft)
- Population (2023): 182
  - Density: 14.7/km^{2} (38.1/sq mi)
- Time zone: UTC+01:00 (CET)
  - Summer (DST): UTC+02:00 (CEST)
- INSEE/Postal code: 71519 /71310
- ^{1} French Land Register data, which excludes lakes, ponds, glaciers > 1 km^{2} (0.386 sq mi or 247 acres) and river estuaries.

Serrigny-en-Bresse (French pronunciation: [seʁiɲi ɑ̃ bʁɛs], literally Serrigny in Bresse) is a commune in the Saône-et-Loire department in the region of Bourgogne-Franche-Comté in eastern France.

== See also ==
- Communes of the Saône-et-Loire department
