= La Chaux, Saône-et-Loire =

La Chaux
- Commune
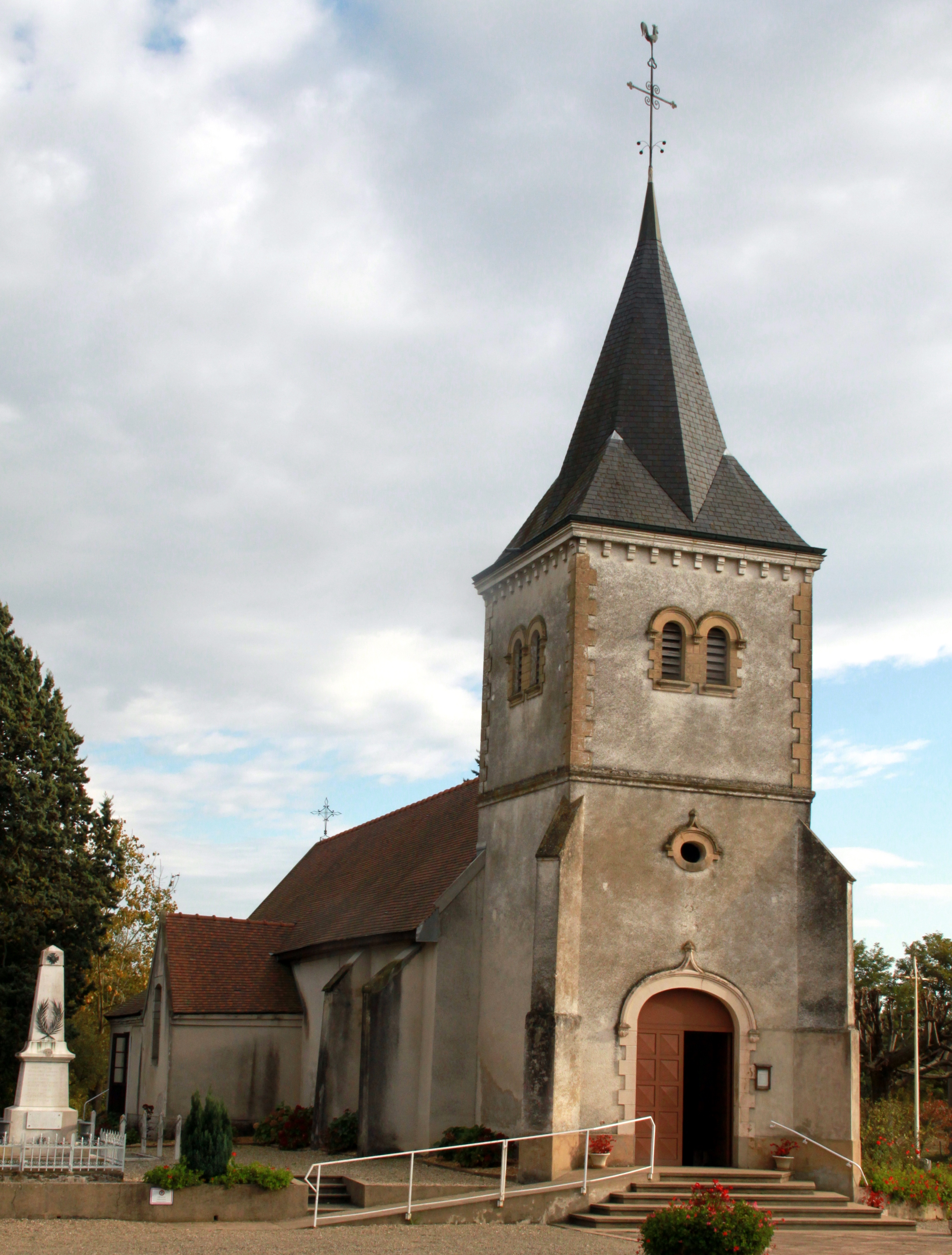
- The church in La Chaux
- Location of La Chaux
- Location within France Location within Bourgogne-Franche-Comté
- Coordinates: 46°49′42″N 5°15′40″E
- Country: France
- Region: Bourgogne-Franche-Comté
- Department: Saône-et-Loire
- Arrondissement: Louhans
- Canton: Pierre-de-Bresse
- Area^{1}: 11 km^{2} (4.2 sq mi)
- Elevation: 205 m (673 ft)
- Highest elevation: 214 m (702 ft)
- Lowest elevation: 188 m (617 ft)
- Population (2023): 322
  - Density: 29/km^{2} (76/sq mi)
- Time zone: UTC+01:00 (CET)
  - Summer (DST): UTC+02:00 (CEST)
- INSEE/Postal code: 71121 /71310
- ^{1} French Land Register data, which excludes lakes, ponds, glaciers > 1 km^{2} (0.386 sq mi or 247 acres) and river estuaries.

La Chaux (French pronunciation: [la ʃo]) is a commune in the Saône-et-Loire department in the region of Bourgogne-Franche-Comté in eastern France.

== See also ==
- Communes of the Saône-et-Loire department
