= Le Tartre =

- Commune
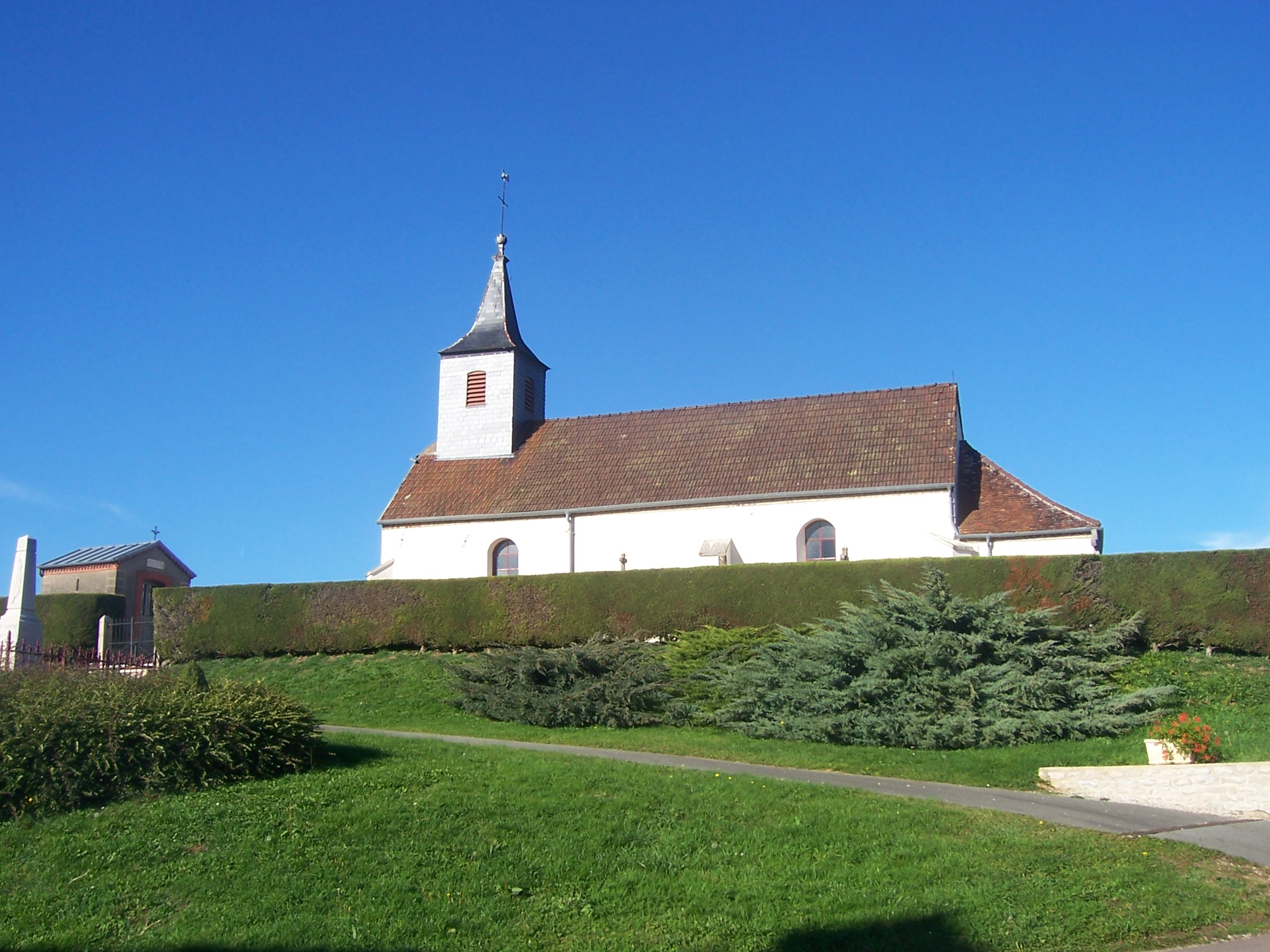
- The church in Le Tartre

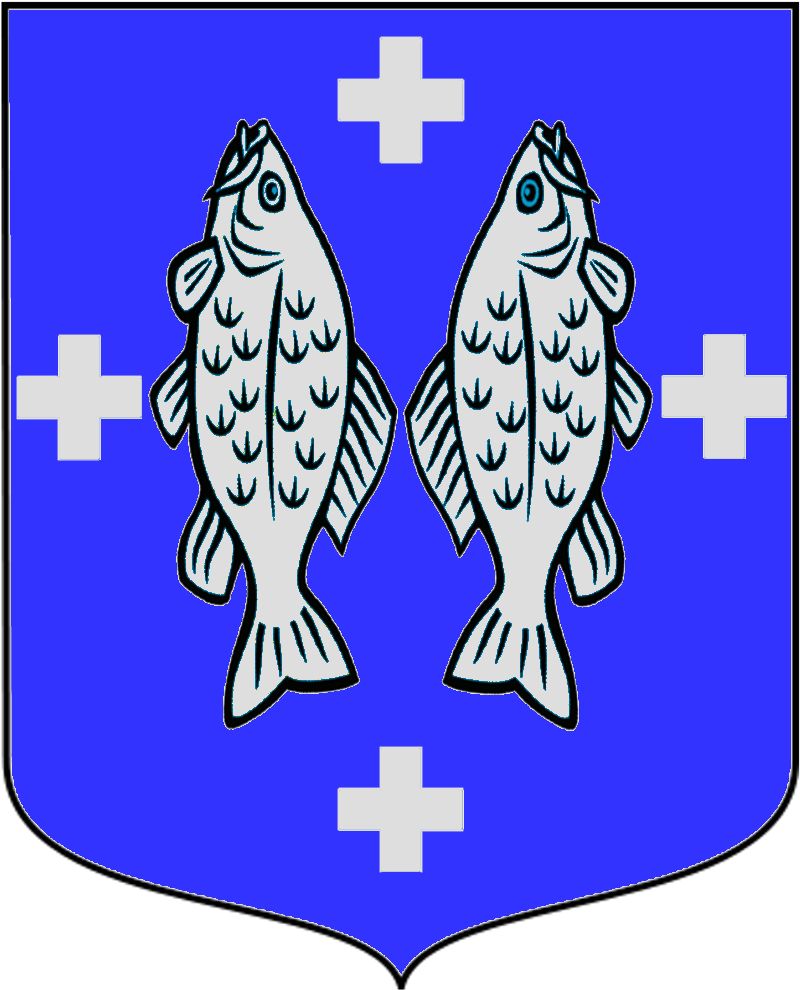
- Coat of arms
- Location of Le Tartre
- Location within France Location within Bourgogne-Franche-Comté
- Coordinates: 46°44′31″N 5°21′47″E
- Country: France
- Region: Bourgogne-Franche-Comté
- Department: Saône-et-Loire
- Arrondissement: Louhans
- Canton: Pierre-de-Bresse
- Area^{1}: 3.83 km^{2} (1.48 sq mi)
- Elevation: 207 m (679 ft)
- Highest elevation: 210 m (690 ft)
- Lowest elevation: 185 m (607 ft)
- Population (2023): 107
  - Density: 27.9/km^{2} (72.4/sq mi)
- Time zone: UTC+01:00 (CET)
  - Summer (DST): UTC+02:00 (CEST)
- INSEE/Postal code: 71534 /71330
- ^{1} French Land Register data, which excludes lakes, ponds, glaciers > 1 km^{2} (0.386 sq mi or 247 acres) and river estuaries.

Le Tartre (French pronunciation: [lə taʁtʁ]) is a commune in the Saône-et-Loire department in the region of Bourgogne-Franche-Comté in eastern France.

== See also ==
- Communes of the Saône-et-Loire department
