= Frangy-en-Bresse =

- Commune
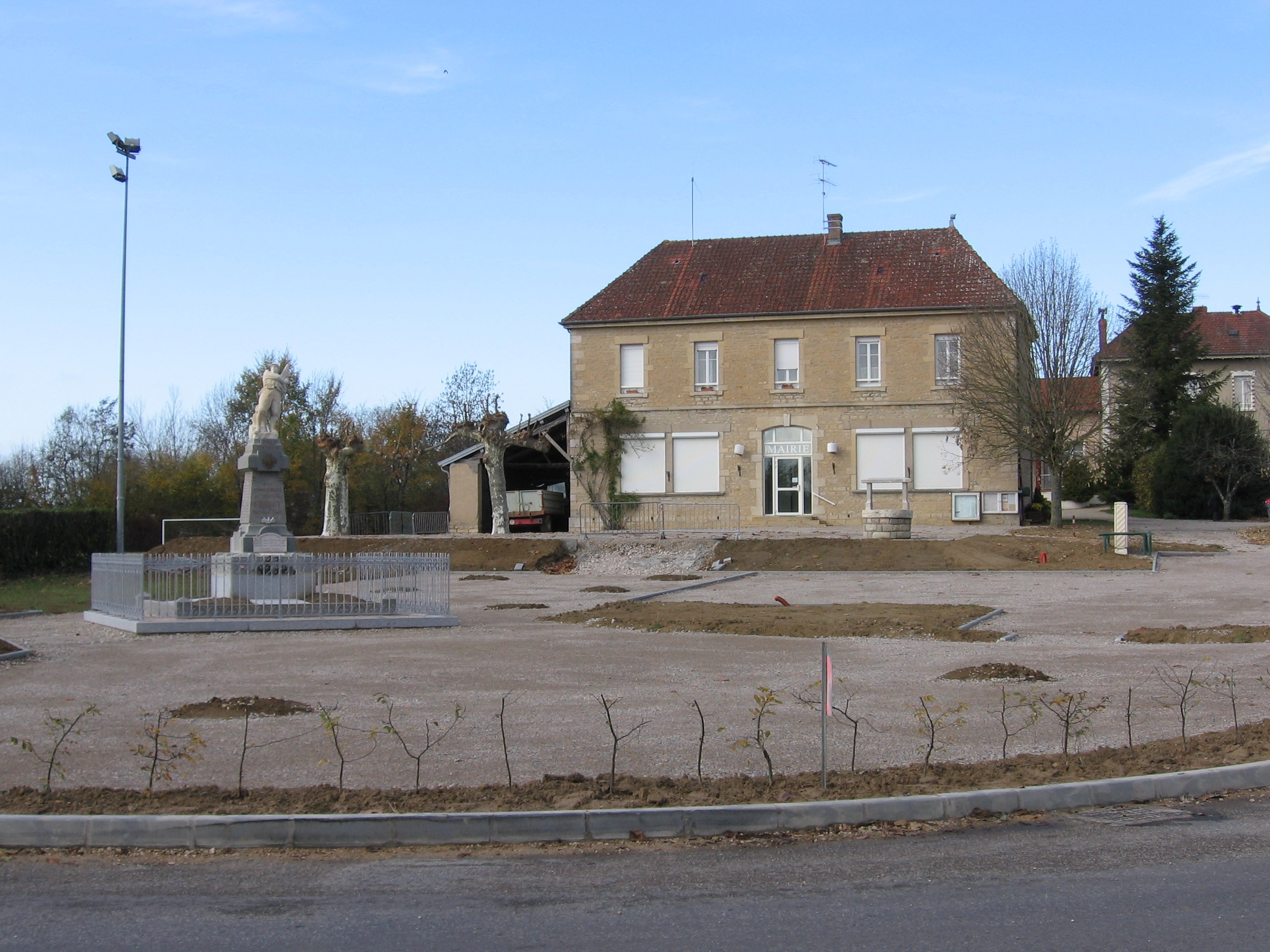
- The town hall in Frangy-en-Bresse

- Coat of arms
- Location of Frangy-en-Bresse
- Location within France Location within Bourgogne-Franche-Comté
- Coordinates: 46°43′58″N 5°20′09″E
- Country: France
- Region: Bourgogne-Franche-Comté
- Department: Saône-et-Loire
- Arrondissement: Louhans
- Canton: Pierre-de-Bresse
- Area^{1}: 23.68 km^{2} (9.14 sq mi)
- Elevation: 200 m (660 ft)
- Highest elevation: 212 m (696 ft)
- Lowest elevation: 180 m (590 ft)
- Population (2023): 678
  - Density: 28.6/km^{2} (74.2/sq mi)
- Time zone: UTC+01:00 (CET)
  - Summer (DST): UTC+02:00 (CEST)
- INSEE/Postal code: 71205 /71330
- ^{1} French Land Register data, which excludes lakes, ponds, glaciers > 1 km^{2} (0.386 sq mi or 247 acres) and river estuaries.

Frangy-en-Bresse (French pronunciation: [fʁɑ̃ʒi ɑ̃ bʁɛs], literally Frangy in Bresse) is a commune in the Saône-et-Loire department in the region of Bourgogne-Franche-Comté in eastern France.

== See also ==
- Communes of the Saône-et-Loire department
