= Beauvernois =

- Commune
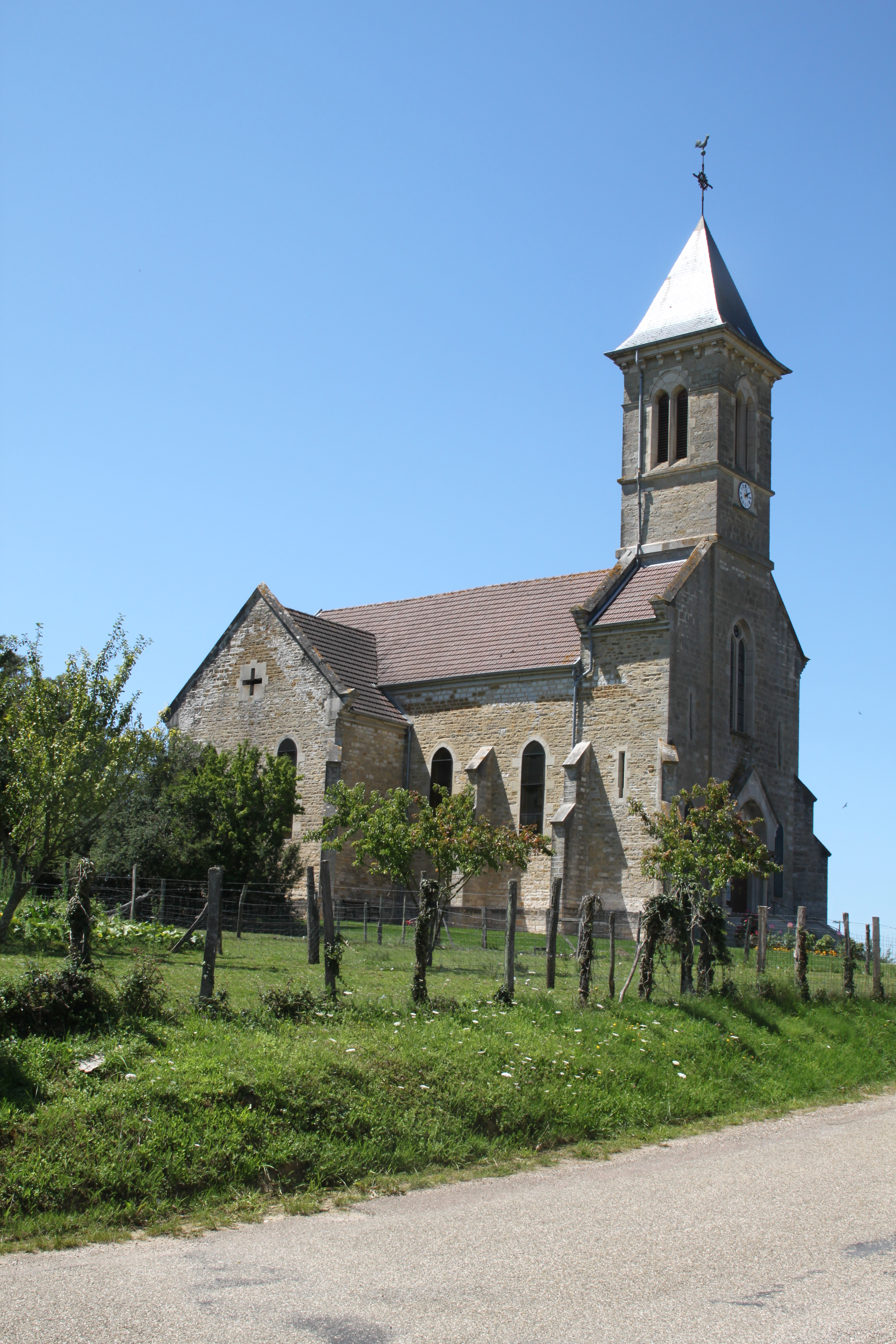

- Coat of arms
- Location of Beauvernois
- Location within France Location within Bourgogne-Franche-Comté
- Coordinates: 46°50′06″N 5°26′42″E
- Country: France
- Region: Bourgogne-Franche-Comté
- Department: Saône-et-Loire
- Arrondissement: Louhans
- Canton: Pierre-de-Bresse

Government
  - Mayor (2022–2026): Alix Trossat
- Area^{1}: 8.94 km^{2} (3.45 sq mi)
- Elevation: 220 m (720 ft)
- Highest elevation: 218 m (715 ft)
- Lowest elevation: 191 m (627 ft)
- Population (2023): 105
  - Density: 11.7/km^{2} (30.4/sq mi)
- Time zone: UTC+01:00 (CET)
  - Summer (DST): UTC+02:00 (CEST)
- INSEE/Postal code: 71028 /71270
- ^{1} French Land Register data, which excludes lakes, ponds, glaciers > 1 km^{2} (0.386 sq mi or 247 acres) and river estuaries.

Beauvernois (French pronunciation: [bovɛʁnwa]) is a commune in the Saône-et-Loire department in the region of Bourgogne-Franche-Comté in eastern France.

== Population ==
Historical population
Year	Pop.	±% p.a.
1968	155	—
1975	119	−3.71%
1982	97	−2.88%
1990	76	−3.00%
1999	82	+0.85%
2007	89	+1.03%
2012	107	+3.75%
2017	115	+1.45%
2023	105	−1.50%
Source: INSEE

== See also ==
- Communes of the Saône-et-Loire department
