= Montjay, Saône-et-Loire =

Montjay
- Commune
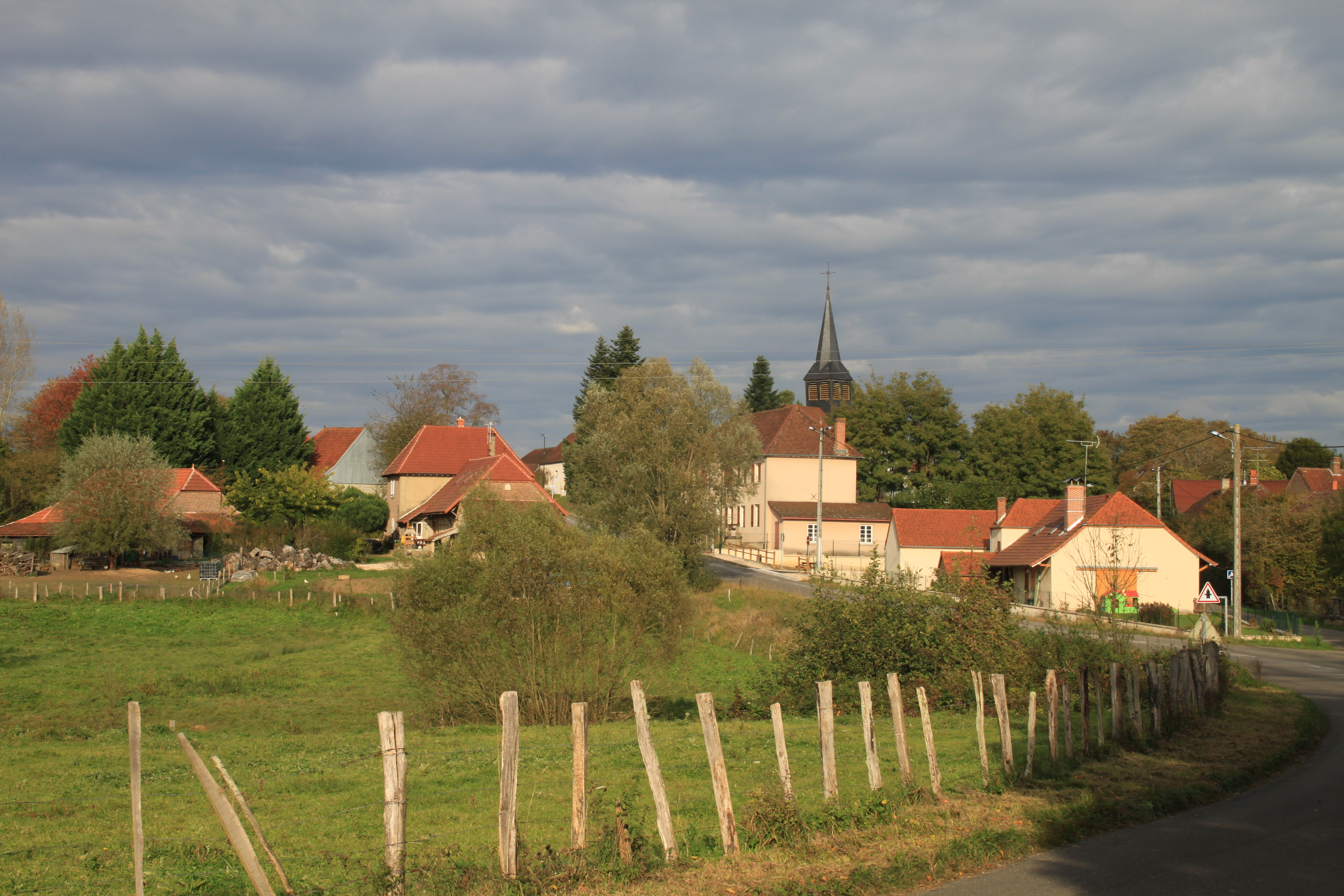
- A general view of Montjay
- Location of Montjay
- Location within France Location within Bourgogne-Franche-Comté
- Coordinates: 46°48′28″N 5°18′39″E
- Country: France
- Region: Bourgogne-Franche-Comté
- Department: Saône-et-Loire
- Arrondissement: Louhans
- Canton: Pierre-de-Bresse
- Area^{1}: 11.03 km^{2} (4.26 sq mi)
- Elevation: 200 m (660 ft)
- Highest elevation: 209 m (686 ft)
- Lowest elevation: 182 m (597 ft)
- Population (2023): 196
  - Density: 17.8/km^{2} (46.0/sq mi)
- Time zone: UTC+01:00 (CET)
  - Summer (DST): UTC+02:00 (CEST)
- INSEE/Postal code: 71314 /71310
- ^{1} French Land Register data, which excludes lakes, ponds, glaciers > 1 km^{2} (0.386 sq mi or 247 acres) and river estuaries.

Montjay (French pronunciation: [mɔ̃ʒɛ]) is a commune in the Saône-et-Loire department in the region of Bourgogne-Franche-Comté in eastern France.

== See also ==
- Communes of the Saône-et-Loire department
