= Mervans =

- Commune
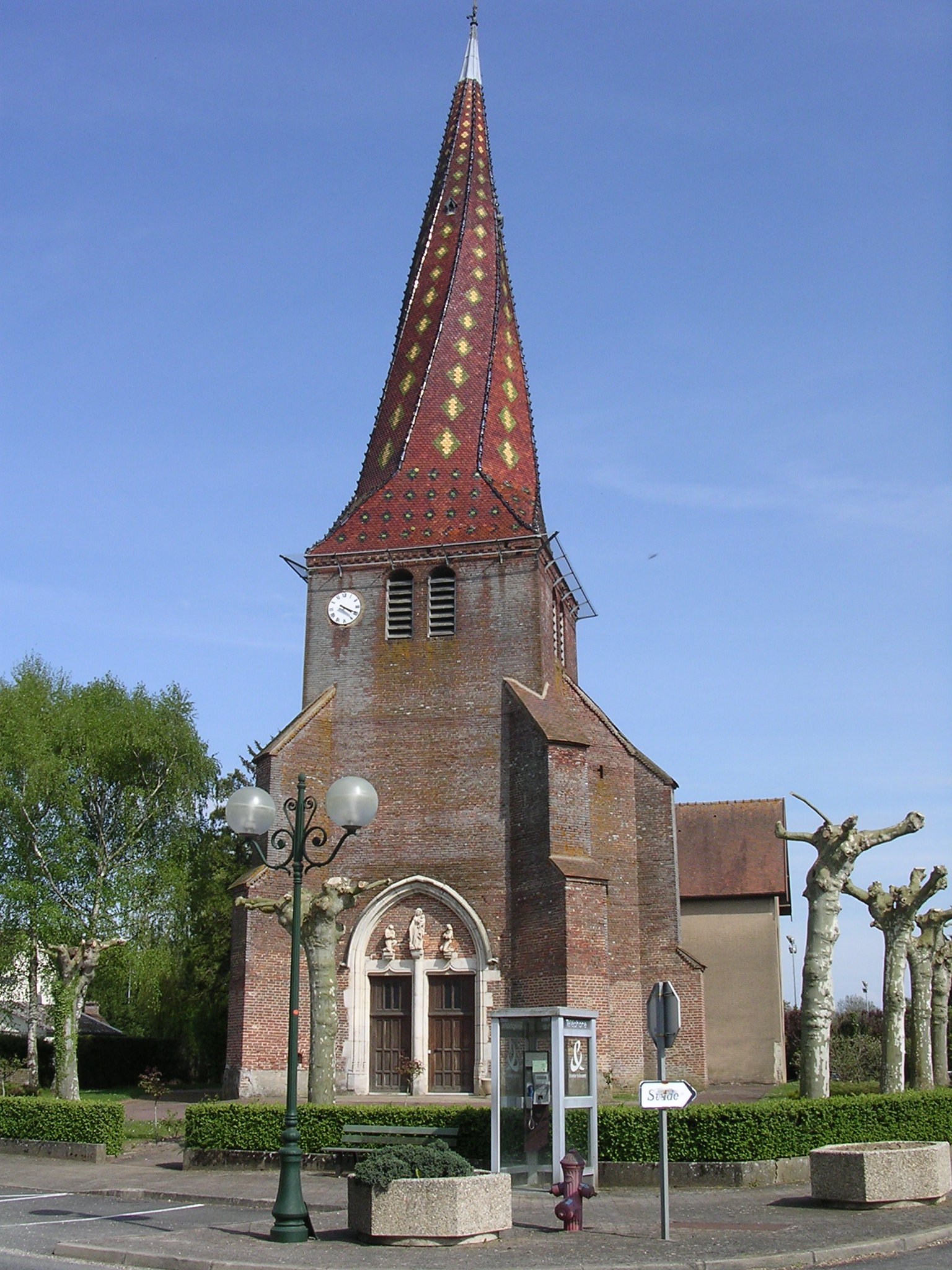
- The church in Mervans

- Coat of arms
- Location of Mervans
- Location within France Location within Bourgogne-Franche-Comté
- Coordinates: 46°47′56″N 5°11′14″E
- Country: France
- Region: Bourgogne-Franche-Comté
- Department: Saône-et-Loire
- Arrondissement: Louhans
- Canton: Pierre-de-Bresse

Government
  - Mayor (2020–2026): Jean-Luc Naltet
- Area^{1}: 28.78 km^{2} (11.11 sq mi)
- Elevation: 197 m (646 ft)
- Highest elevation: 214 m (702 ft)
- Lowest elevation: 183 m (600 ft)
- Population (2023): 1,485
  - Density: 51.60/km^{2} (133.6/sq mi)
- Time zone: UTC+01:00 (CET)
  - Summer (DST): UTC+02:00 (CEST)
- INSEE/Postal code: 71295 /71310
- ^{1} French Land Register data, which excludes lakes, ponds, glaciers > 1 km^{2} (0.386 sq mi or 247 acres) and river estuaries.

Mervans (French pronunciation: [mɛʁvɑ̃]) is a commune in the Saône-et-Loire department in the region of Bourgogne-Franche-Comté in eastern France.

== See also ==
- Communes of the Saône-et-Loire department
