= Saint-Bonnet-en-Bresse =

- Commune
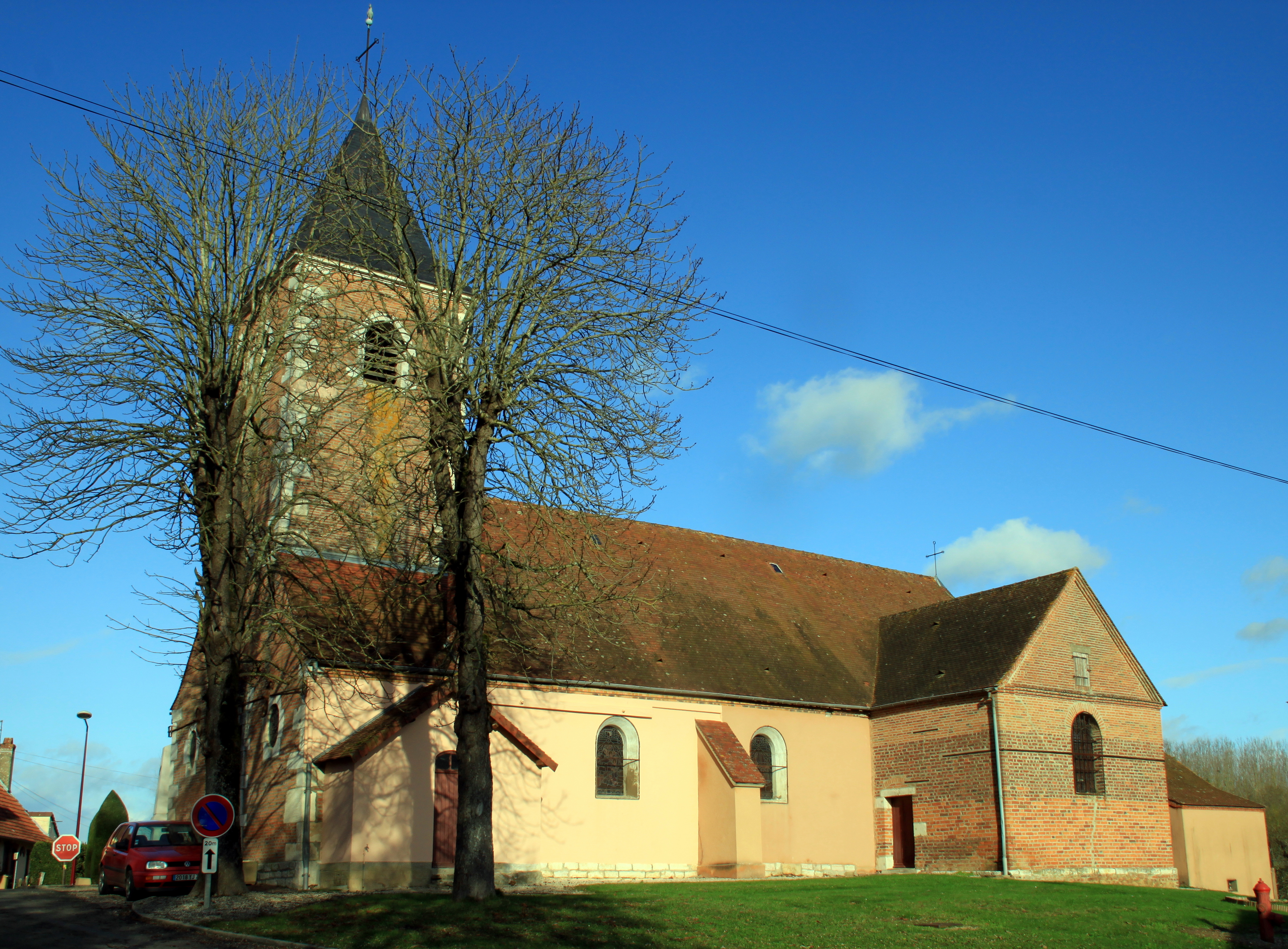
- The church in Saint-Bonnet-en-Bresse
- Location of Saint-Bonnet-en-Bresse
- Location within France Location within Bourgogne-Franche-Comté
- Coordinates: 46°51′17″N 5°10′37″E
- Country: France
- Region: Bourgogne-Franche-Comté
- Department: Saône-et-Loire
- Arrondissement: Louhans
- Canton: Pierre-de-Bresse
- Area^{1}: 17.61 km^{2} (6.80 sq mi)
- Elevation: 192 m (630 ft)
- Highest elevation: 198 m (650 ft)
- Lowest elevation: 177 m (581 ft)
- Population (2023): 496
  - Density: 28.2/km^{2} (72.9/sq mi)
- Time zone: UTC+01:00 (CET)
  - Summer (DST): UTC+02:00 (CEST)
- INSEE/Postal code: 71396 /71310
- ^{1} French Land Register data, which excludes lakes, ponds, glaciers > 1 km^{2} (0.386 sq mi or 247 acres) and river estuaries.

Saint-Bonnet-en-Bresse (French pronunciation: [sɛ̃ bɔnɛ ɑ̃ bʁɛs], literally Saint-Bonnet in Bresse) is a commune in the Saône-et-Loire department in the region of Bourgogne-Franche-Comté in eastern France.

== See also ==
- Communes of the Saône-et-Loire department
