= Thurey =

- Commune
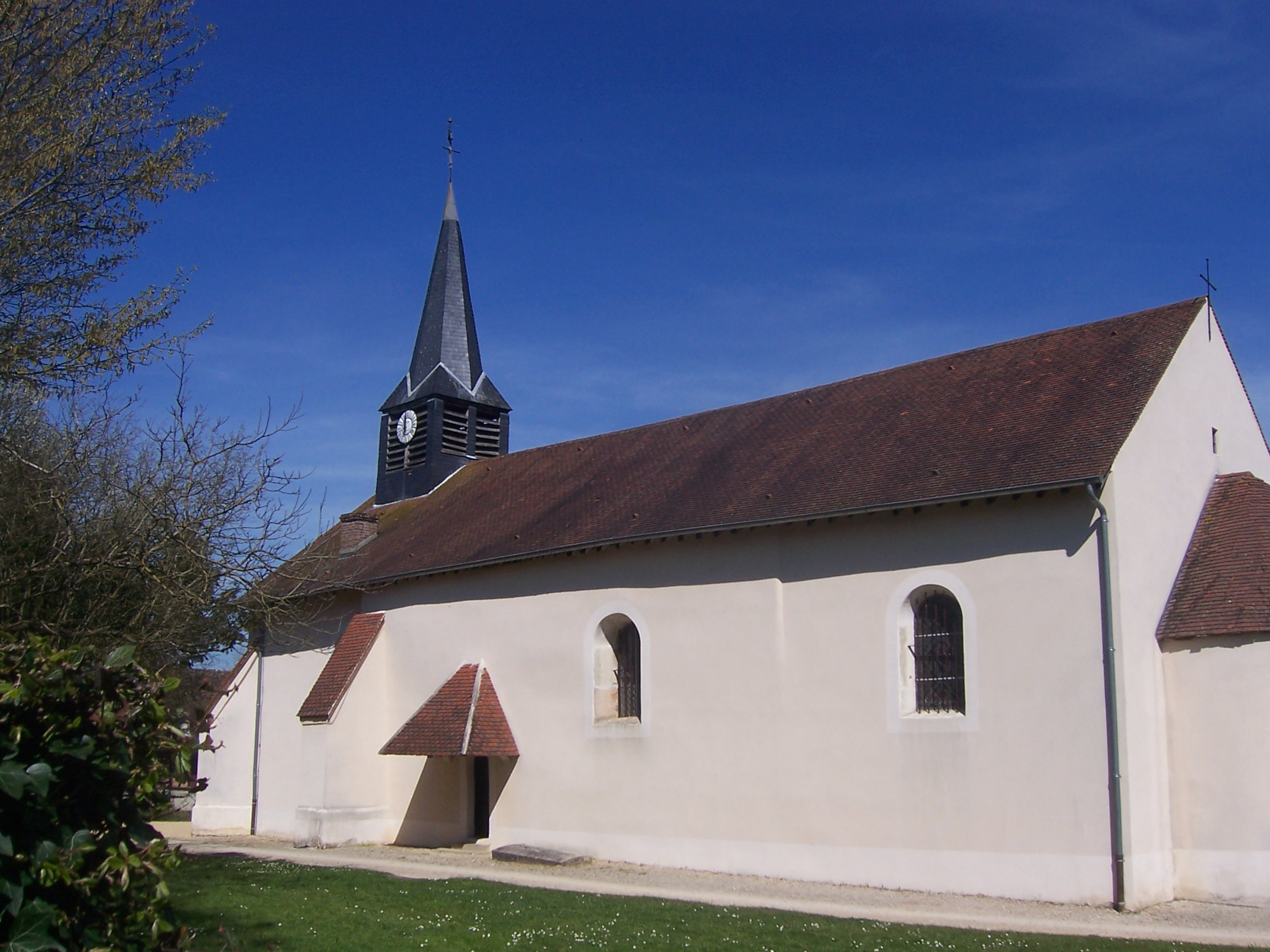
- The church in Thurey
- Location of Thurey
- Location within France Location within Bourgogne-Franche-Comté
- Coordinates: 46°44′41″N 5°07′25″E
- Country: France
- Region: Bourgogne-Franche-Comté
- Department: Saône-et-Loire
- Arrondissement: Louhans
- Canton: Pierre-de-Bresse
- Area^{1}: 18.22 km^{2} (7.03 sq mi)
- Elevation: 209 m (686 ft)
- Highest elevation: 215 m (705 ft)
- Lowest elevation: 187 m (614 ft)
- Population (2023): 423
  - Density: 23.2/km^{2} (60.1/sq mi)
- Time zone: UTC+01:00 (CET)
  - Summer (DST): UTC+02:00 (CEST)
- INSEE/Postal code: 71538 /71440
- ^{1} French Land Register data, which excludes lakes, ponds, glaciers > 1 km^{2} (0.386 sq mi or 247 acres) and river estuaries.

Thurey (French pronunciation: [tyʁɛ]) is a commune in the Saône-et-Loire department in the region of Bourgogne-Franche-Comté in eastern France.

== See also ==
- Communes of the Saône-et-Loire department
