= Devrouze =

- Commune
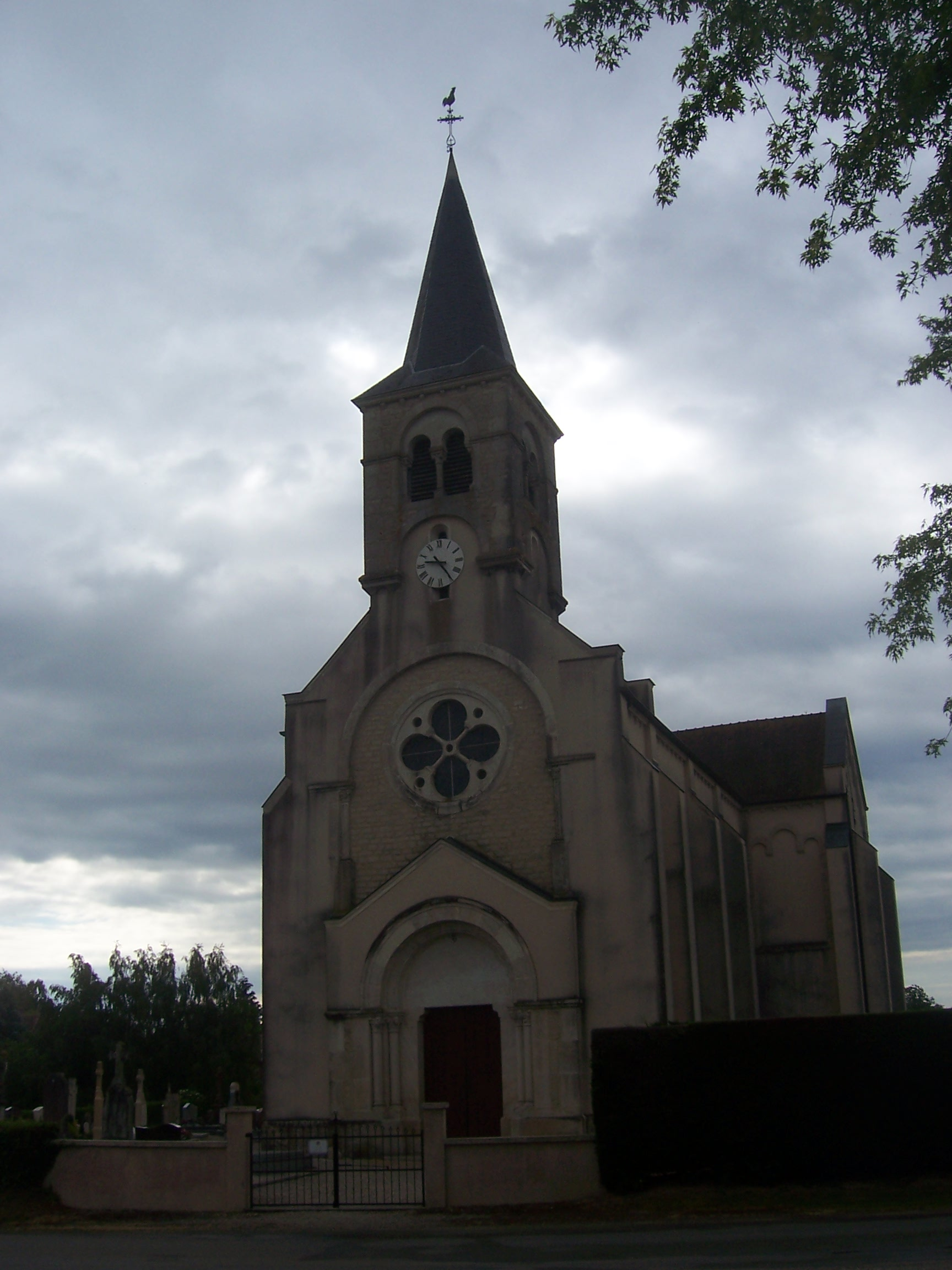
- The church in Devrouze

- Coat of arms
- Location of Devrouze
- Location within France Location within Bourgogne-Franche-Comté
- Coordinates: 46°45′49″N 5°09′32″E
- Country: France
- Region: Bourgogne-Franche-Comté
- Department: Saône-et-Loire
- Arrondissement: Louhans
- Canton: Pierre-de-Bresse
- Area^{1}: 14.64 km^{2} (5.65 sq mi)
- Elevation: 210 m (690 ft)
- Highest elevation: 212 m (696 ft)
- Lowest elevation: 187 m (614 ft)
- Population (2023): 327
  - Density: 22.3/km^{2} (57.9/sq mi)
- Time zone: UTC+01:00 (CET)
  - Summer (DST): UTC+02:00 (CEST)
- INSEE/Postal code: 71173 /71330
- ^{1} French Land Register data, which excludes lakes, ponds, glaciers > 1 km^{2} (0.386 sq mi or 247 acres) and river estuaries.

Devrouze is a commune in the Saône-et-Loire department in the region of Bourgogne-Franche-Comté in eastern France.

== See also ==
- Communes of the Saône-et-Loire department
