= Bosjean =

- Commune
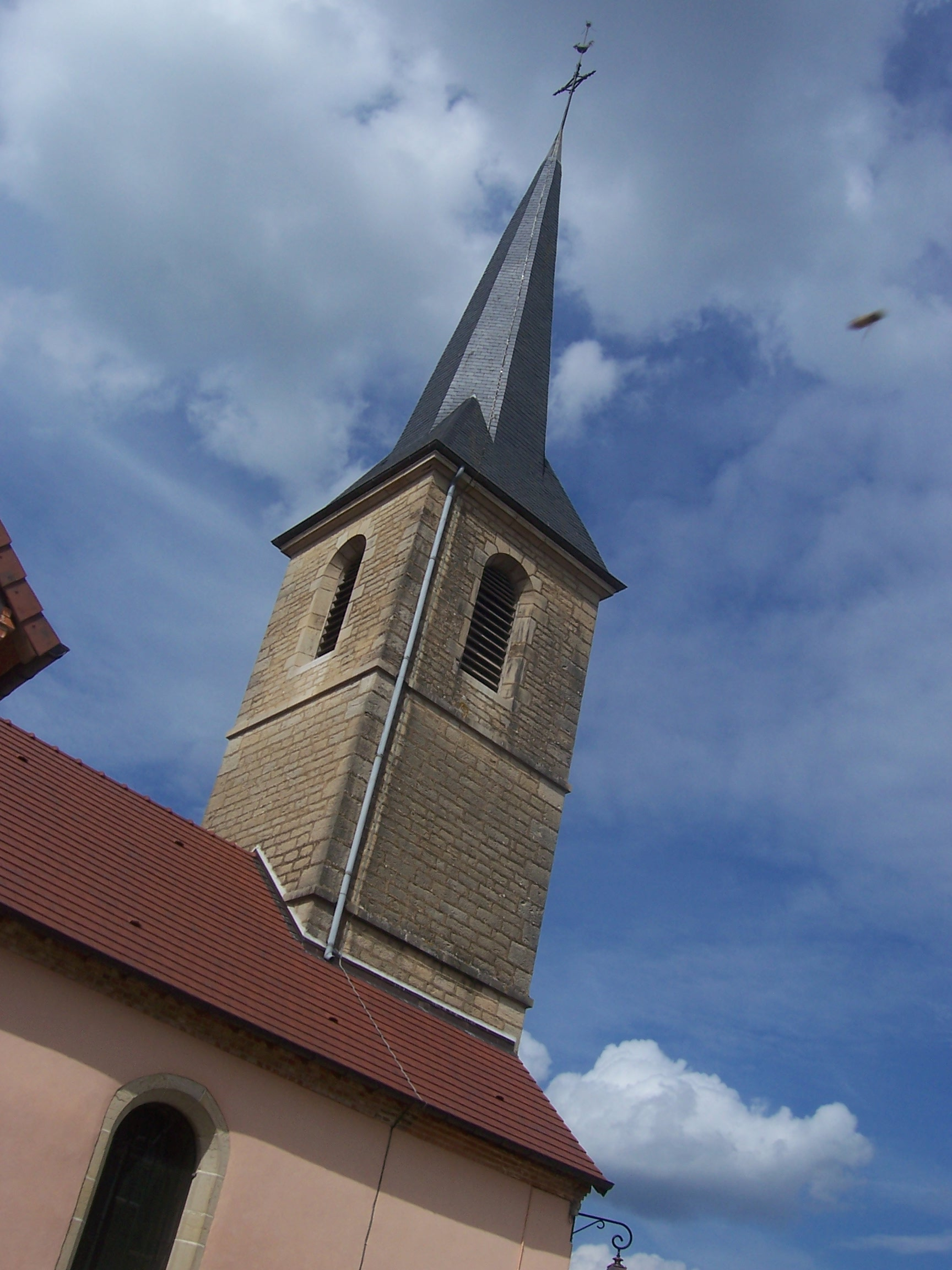
- The church in Bosjean
- Location of Bosjean
- Location within France Location within Bourgogne-Franche-Comté
- Coordinates: 46°45′43″N 5°20′09″E
- Country: France
- Region: Bourgogne-Franche-Comté
- Department: Saône-et-Loire
- Arrondissement: Louhans
- Canton: Pierre-de-Bresse
- Area^{1}: 18.64 km^{2} (7.20 sq mi)
- Elevation: 202 m (663 ft)
- Highest elevation: 214 m (702 ft)
- Lowest elevation: 181 m (594 ft)
- Population (2023): 321
  - Density: 17.2/km^{2} (44.6/sq mi)
- Time zone: UTC+01:00 (CET)
  - Summer (DST): UTC+02:00 (CEST)
- INSEE/Postal code: 71044 /71330
- ^{1} French Land Register data, which excludes lakes, ponds, glaciers > 1 km^{2} (0.386 sq mi or 247 acres) and river estuaries.

Bosjean is a commune in the Saône-et-Loire department in the region of Bourgogne-Franche-Comté in eastern France.

== See also ==
- Communes of the Saône-et-Loire department
