= Diconne =

- Commune
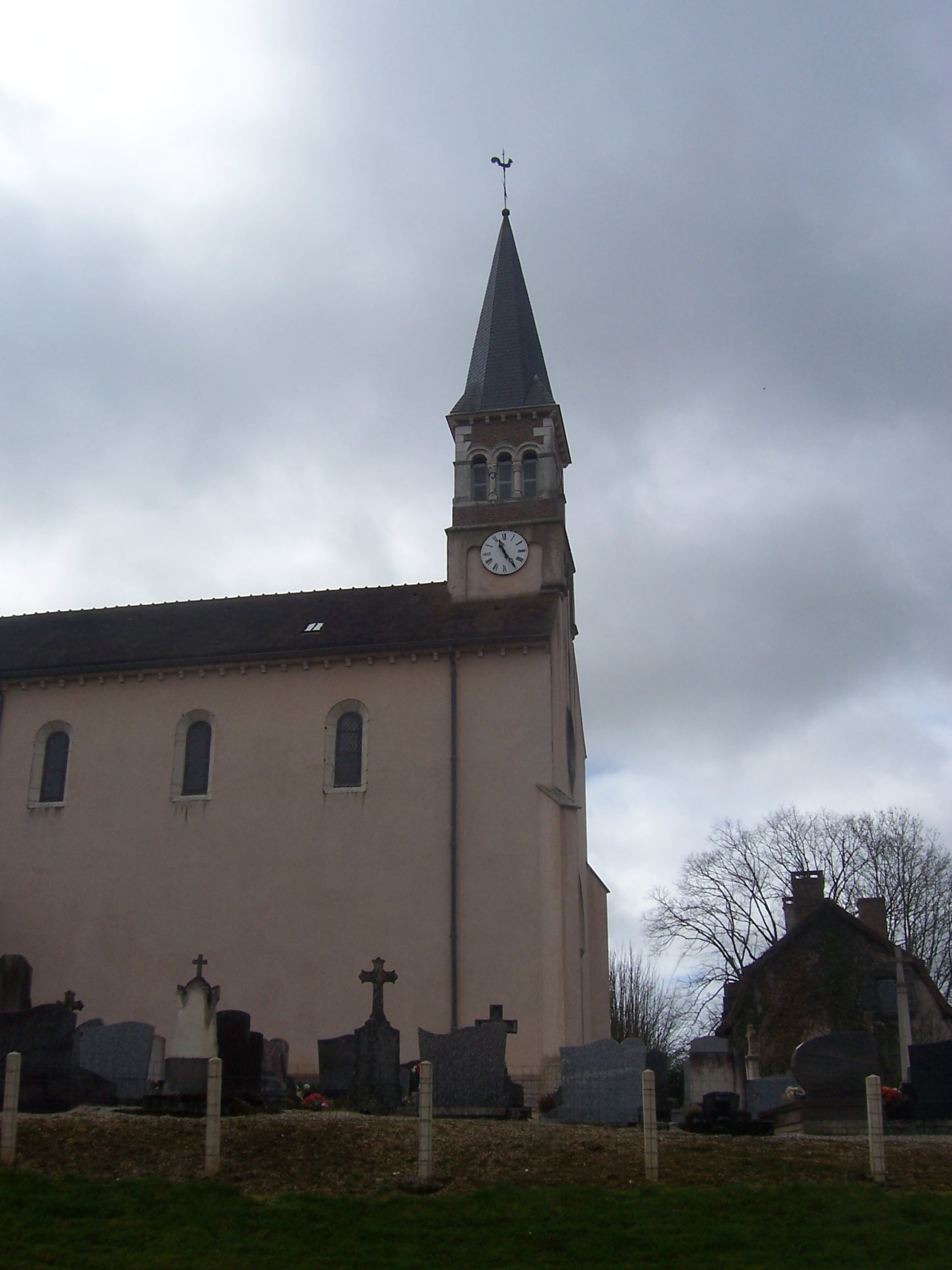
- The church in Diconne

- Coat of arms
- Location of Diconne
- Location within France Location within Bourgogne-Franche-Comté
- Coordinates: 46°46′29″N 5°08′05″E
- Country: France
- Region: Bourgogne-Franche-Comté
- Department: Saône-et-Loire
- Arrondissement: Louhans
- Canton: Pierre-de-Bresse
- Area^{1}: 15.94 km^{2} (6.15 sq mi)
- Elevation: 200 m (660 ft)
- Highest elevation: 215 m (705 ft)
- Lowest elevation: 188 m (617 ft)
- Population (2023): 371
  - Density: 23.3/km^{2} (60.3/sq mi)
- Time zone: UTC+01:00 (CET)
  - Summer (DST): UTC+02:00 (CEST)
- INSEE/Postal code: 71175 /71330
- ^{1} French Land Register data, which excludes lakes, ponds, glaciers > 1 km^{2} (0.386 sq mi or 247 acres) and river estuaries.

Diconne (French pronunciation: [dikɔn]) is a commune in the Saône-et-Loire department in the region of Bourgogne-Franche-Comté in eastern France.

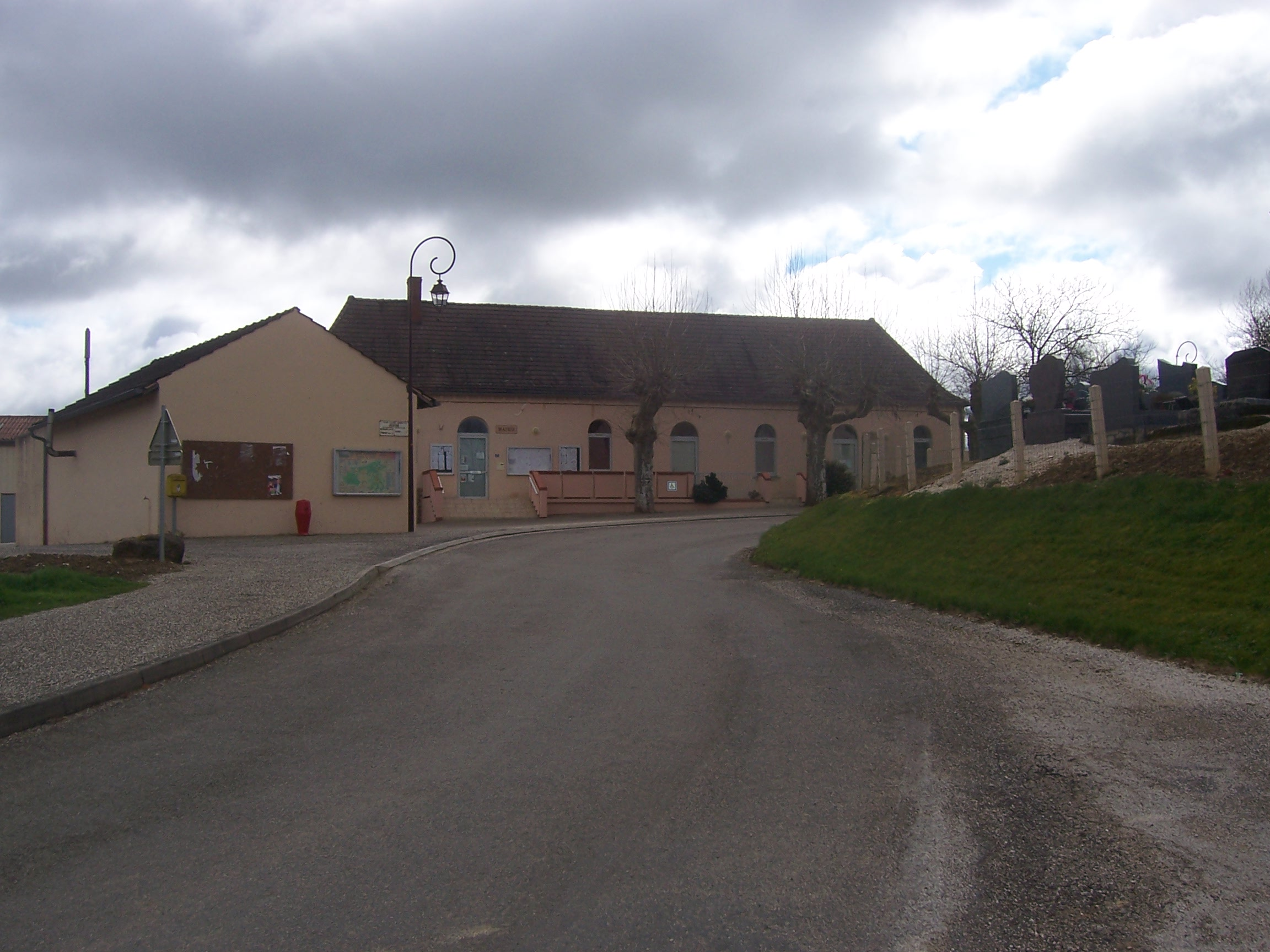
Town hall

== See also ==
- Communes of the Saône-et-Loire department
