= La Chapelle-Saint-Sauveur, Saône-et-Loire =

La Chapelle-Saint-Sauveur
- Commune
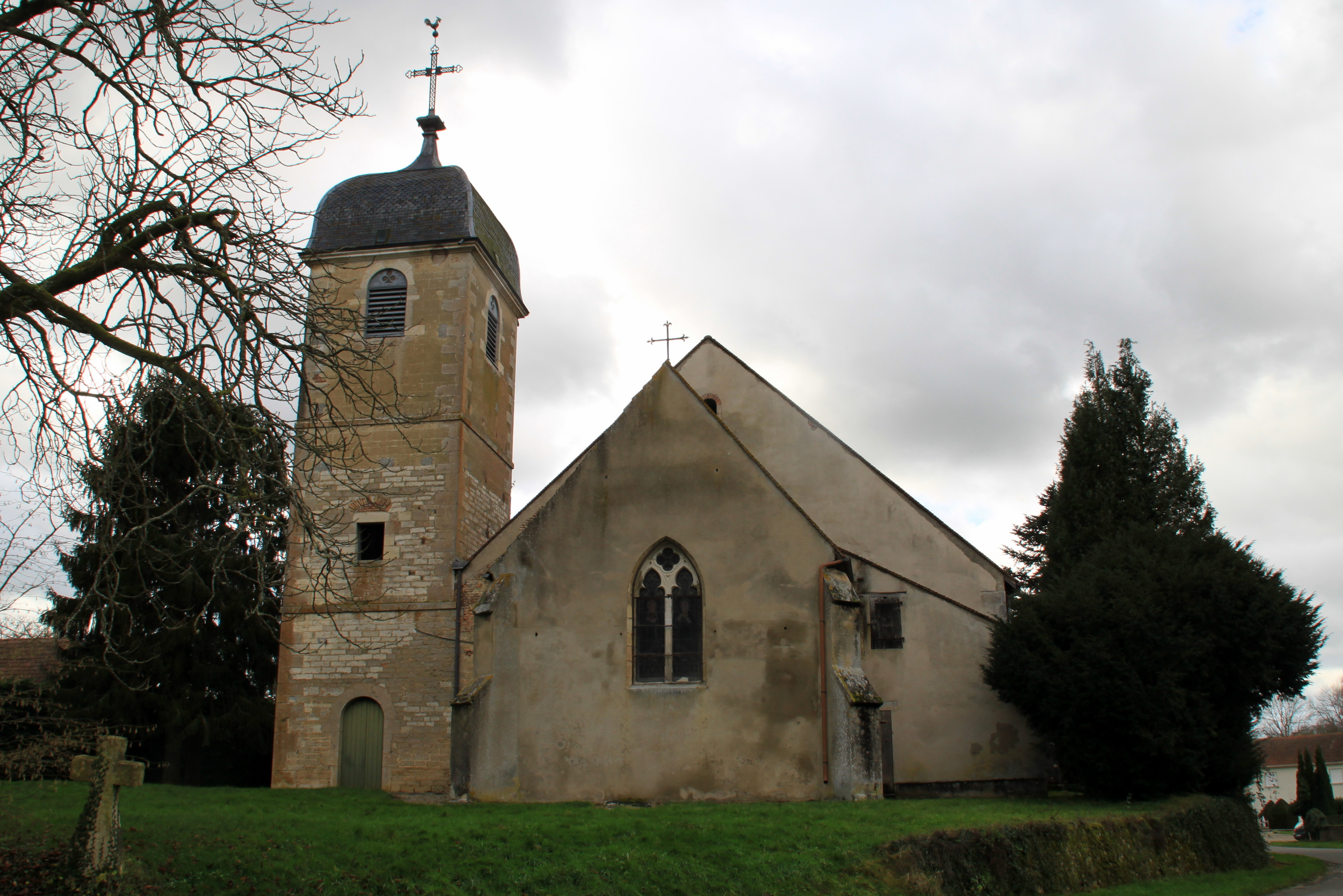
- The church in La Chapelle-Saint-Sauveur
- Location of La Chapelle-Saint-Sauveur
- Location within France Location within Bourgogne-Franche-Comté
- Coordinates: 46°50′40″N 5°16′09″E
- Country: France
- Region: Bourgogne-Franche-Comté
- Department: Saône-et-Loire
- Arrondissement: Louhans
- Canton: Pierre-de-Bresse
- Area^{1}: 27.36 km^{2} (10.56 sq mi)
- Elevation: 215 m (705 ft)
- Highest elevation: 215 m (705 ft)
- Lowest elevation: 184 m (604 ft)
- Population (2023): 641
  - Density: 23.4/km^{2} (60.7/sq mi)
- Time zone: UTC+01:00 (CET)
  - Summer (DST): UTC+02:00 (CEST)
- INSEE/Postal code: 71093 /71310
- ^{1} French Land Register data, which excludes lakes, ponds, glaciers > 1 km^{2} (0.386 sq mi or 247 acres) and river estuaries.

La Chapelle-Saint-Sauveur (French pronunciation: [la ʃapɛl sɛ̃ sovœʁ]) is a commune in the Saône-et-Loire department in the region of Bourgogne-Franche-Comté in eastern France. The commune is located in the canton of Pierre-de-Bresse and the arrondissement of Louhans.

== See also ==
- Communes of the Saône-et-Loire department
