= Le Planois =

- Commune
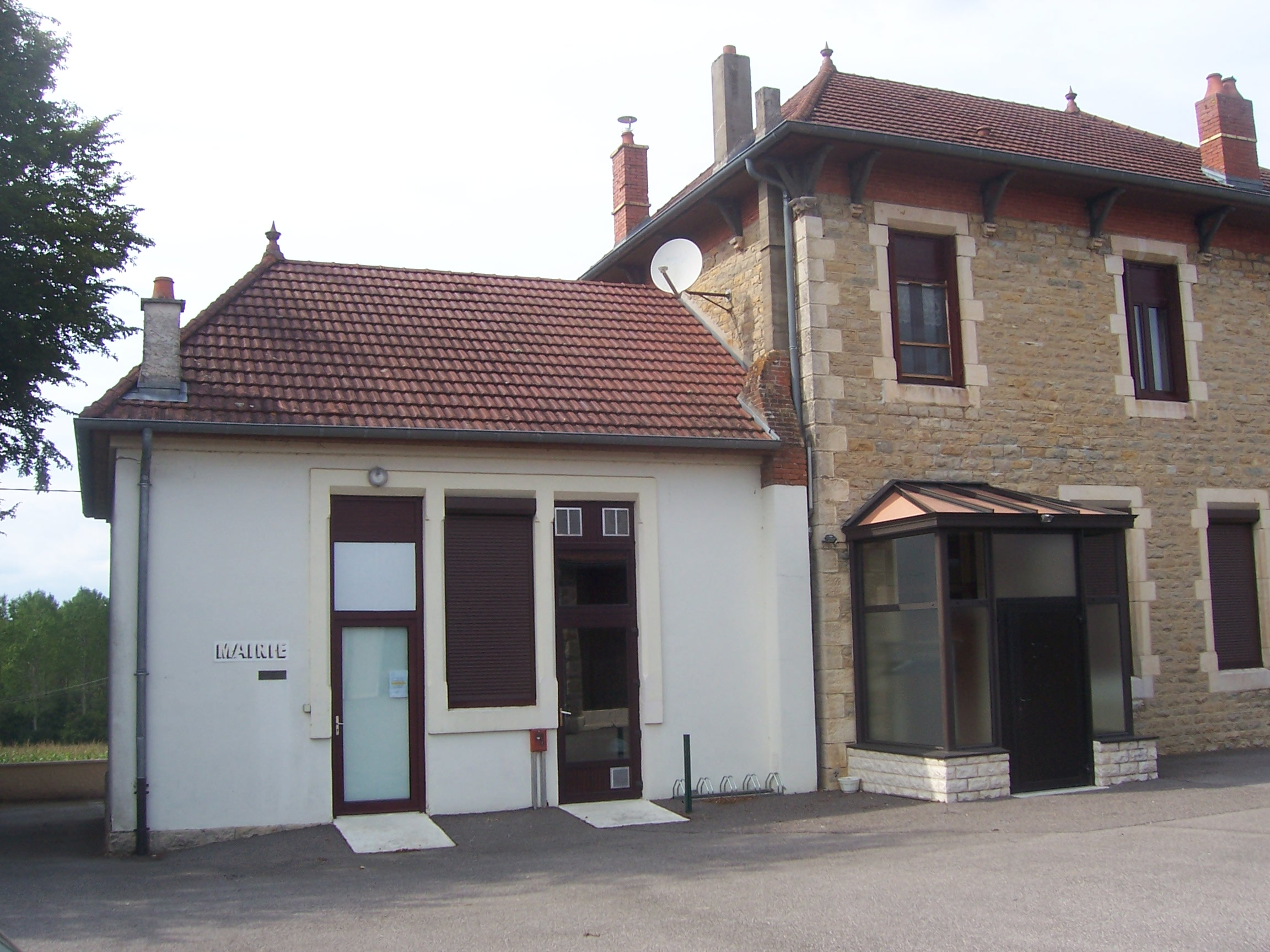
- The town hall in Le Planois

- Coat of arms
- Location of Le Planois
- Location within France Location within Bourgogne-Franche-Comté
- Coordinates: 46°47′18″N 5°19′41″E
- Country: France
- Region: Bourgogne-Franche-Comté
- Department: Saône-et-Loire
- Arrondissement: Louhans
- Canton: Pierre-de-Bresse
- Area^{1}: 5.17 km^{2} (2.00 sq mi)
- Elevation: 199 m (653 ft)
- Highest elevation: 208 m (682 ft)
- Lowest elevation: 181 m (594 ft)
- Population (2023): 90
  - Density: 17/km^{2} (45/sq mi)
- Time zone: UTC+01:00 (CET)
  - Summer (DST): UTC+02:00 (CEST)
- INSEE/Postal code: 71352 /71330
- ^{1} French Land Register data, which excludes lakes, ponds, glaciers > 1 km^{2} (0.386 sq mi or 247 acres) and river estuaries.

Le Planois (French pronunciation: [lə planwa]) is a commune in the Saône-et-Loire department in the region of Bourgogne-Franche-Comté in eastern France.

== See also ==
- Communes of the Saône-et-Loire department
