= Beaurepaire-en-Bresse =

- Commune
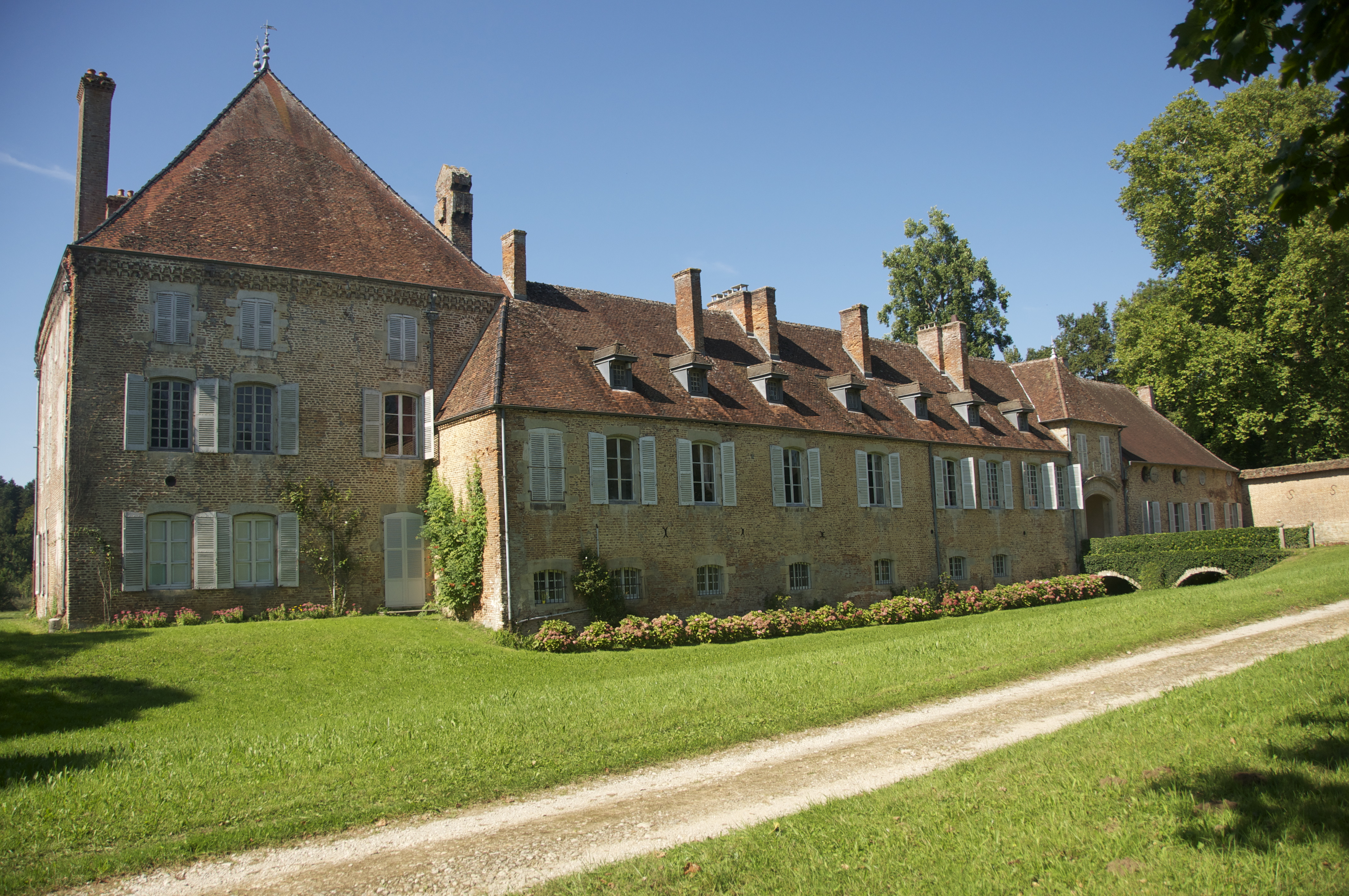
- Chateau
- Location of Beaurepaire-en-Bresse
- Location within France Location within Bourgogne-Franche-Comté
- Coordinates: 46°40′10″N 5°23′19″E
- Country: France
- Region: Bourgogne-Franche-Comté
- Department: Saône-et-Loire
- Arrondissement: Louhans
- Canton: Pierre-de-Bresse

Government
  - Mayor (2020–2026): Martine Chevallier
- Area^{1}: 10.42 km^{2} (4.02 sq mi)
- Elevation: 210 m (690 ft)
- Highest elevation: 222 m (728 ft)
- Lowest elevation: 193 m (633 ft)
- Population (2023): 716
  - Density: 68.7/km^{2} (178/sq mi)
- Time zone: UTC+01:00 (CET)
  - Summer (DST): UTC+02:00 (CEST)
- INSEE/Postal code: 71027 /71580
- ^{1} French Land Register data, which excludes lakes, ponds, glaciers > 1 km^{2} (0.386 sq mi or 247 acres) and river estuaries.

Beaurepaire-en-Bresse (French pronunciation: [boʁpɛʁ ɑ̃ bʁɛs], literally Beaurepaire in Bresse) is a commune in the Saône-et-Loire department in the region of Bourgogne-Franche-Comté in eastern France.

== Population ==
Historical population
Year	Pop.	±% p.a.
1968	537	—
1975	522	−0.40%
1982	505	−0.47%
1990	502	−0.07%
1999	515	+0.28%
2007	595	+1.82%
2012	626	+1.02%
2017	696	+2.14%
2023	716	+0.47%
Source: INSEE

== See also ==
- Communes of the Saône-et-Loire department
