= Torpes, Saône-et-Loire =

Torpes
- Commune
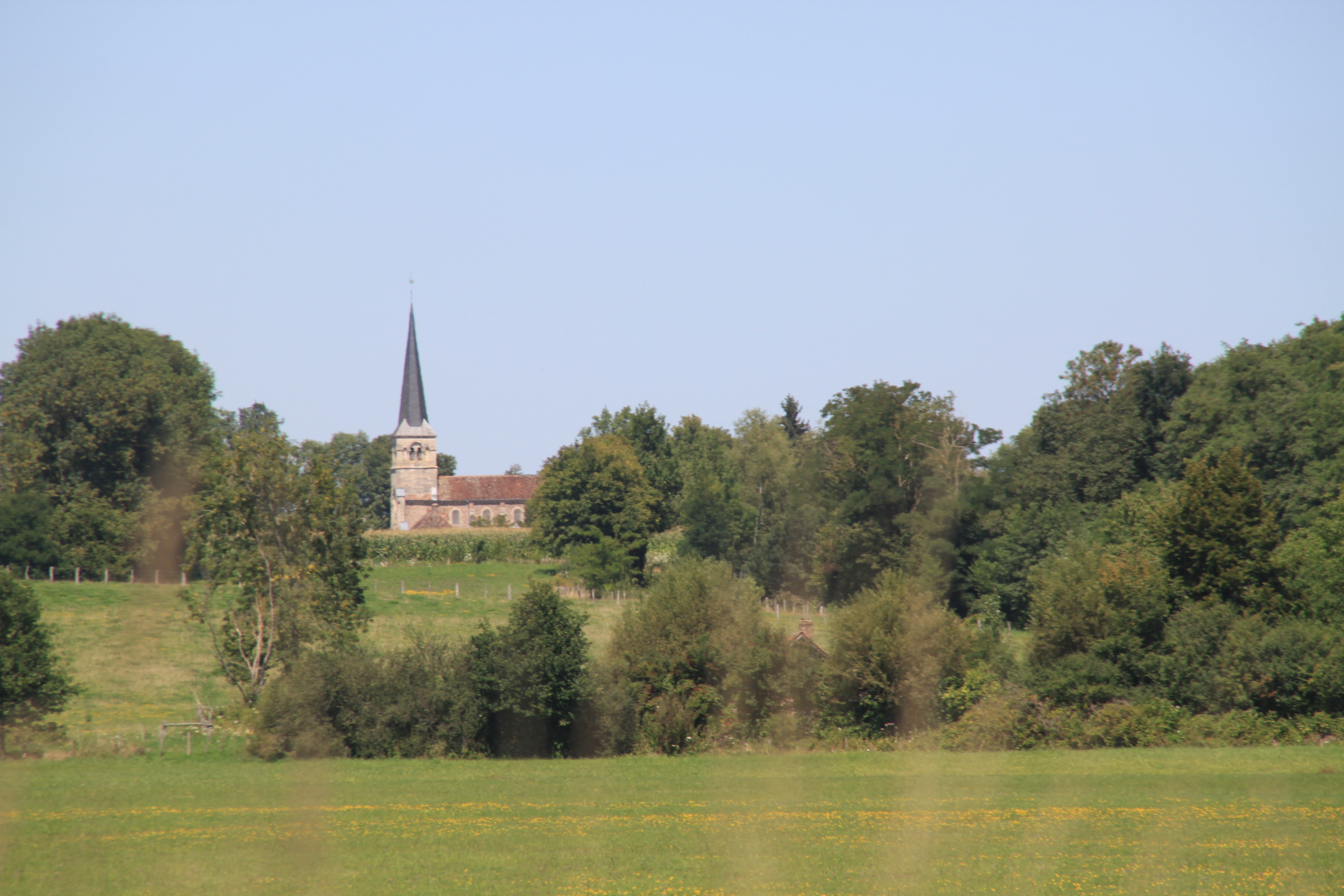
- The church and surroundings in Torpes
- Location of Torpes
- Location within France Location within Bourgogne-Franche-Comté
- Coordinates: 46°50′33″N 5°20′20″E
- Country: France
- Region: Bourgogne-Franche-Comté
- Department: Saône-et-Loire
- Arrondissement: Louhans
- Canton: Pierre-de-Bresse
- Area^{1}: 15.7 km^{2} (6.1 sq mi)
- Elevation: 260 m (850 ft)
- Highest elevation: 212 m (696 ft)
- Lowest elevation: 182 m (597 ft)
- Population (2023): 377
  - Density: 24.0/km^{2} (62.2/sq mi)
- Time zone: UTC+01:00 (CET)
  - Summer (DST): UTC+02:00 (CEST)
- INSEE/Postal code: 71541 /71270
- ^{1} French Land Register data, which excludes lakes, ponds, glaciers > 1 km^{2} (0.386 sq mi or 247 acres) and river estuaries.

Torpes (French pronunciation: [tɔʁp]) is a commune in the Saône-et-Loire department in the region of Bourgogne-Franche-Comté in eastern France.

== See also ==
- Communes of the Saône-et-Loire department
