= Fretterans =

- Commune
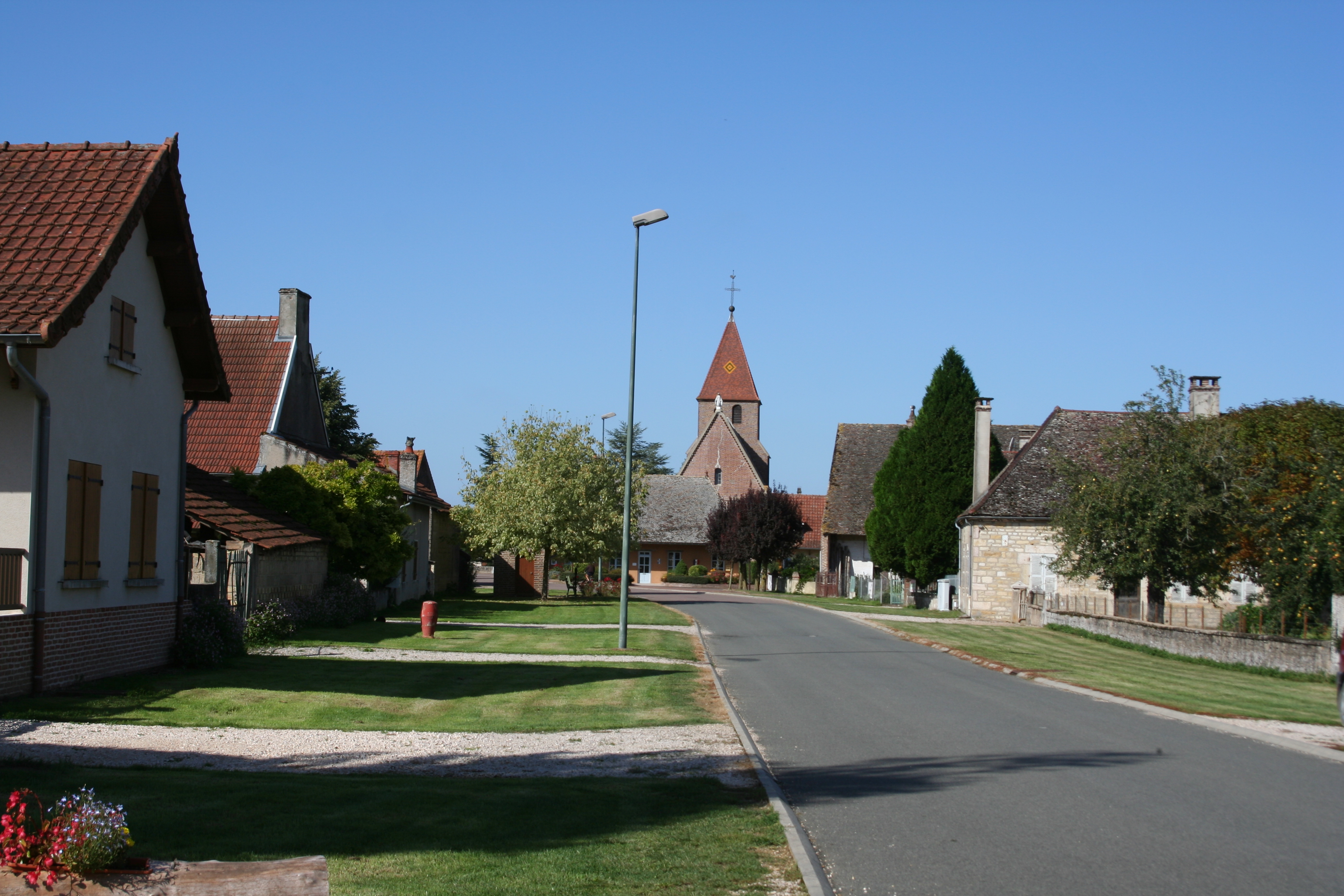
- The church and surroundings in Fretterans
- Location of Fretterans
- Location within France Location within Bourgogne-Franche-Comté
- Coordinates: 46°55′18″N 5°17′26″E
- Country: France
- Region: Bourgogne-Franche-Comté
- Department: Saône-et-Loire
- Arrondissement: Louhans
- Canton: Pierre-de-Bresse
- Area^{1}: 10.27 km^{2} (3.97 sq mi)
- Elevation: 184 m (604 ft)
- Highest elevation: 186 m (610 ft)
- Lowest elevation: 178 m (584 ft)
- Population (2023): 281
  - Density: 27.4/km^{2} (70.9/sq mi)
- Time zone: UTC+01:00 (CET)
  - Summer (DST): UTC+02:00 (CEST)
- INSEE/Postal code: 71207 /71270
- ^{1} French Land Register data, which excludes lakes, ponds, glaciers > 1 km^{2} (0.386 sq mi or 247 acres) and river estuaries.

Fretterans (French pronunciation: [fʁɛtʁɑ̃]) is a commune in the Saône-et-Loire department in the region of Bourgogne-Franche-Comté in eastern France.

== See also ==
- Communes of the Saône-et-Loire department
