= Arrondissement of Louhans =

Coordinates: 46°37′43″N 5°13′27″E

Louhans
- Arrondissement
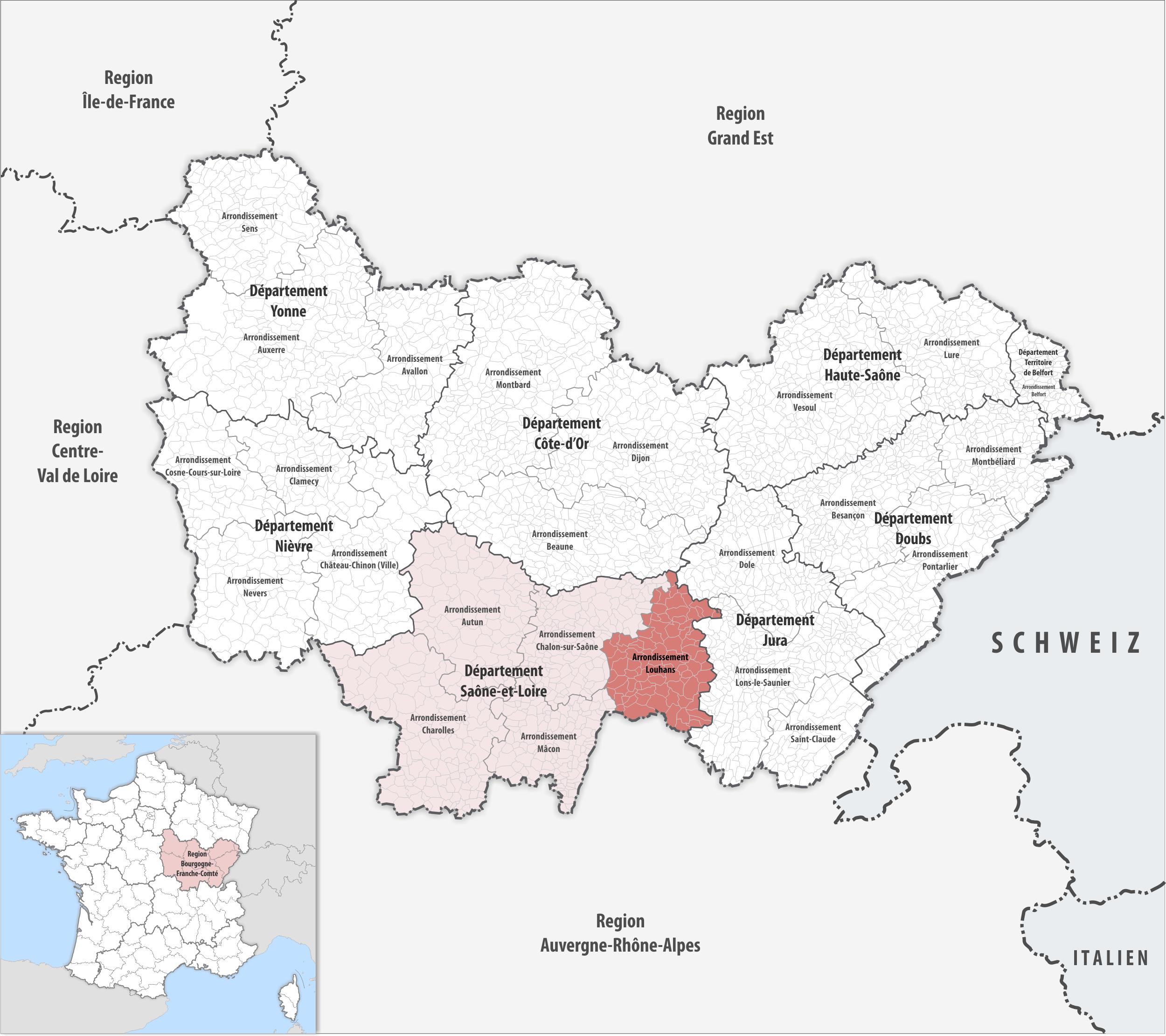
- Location within the region Bourgogne-Franche-Comté
- Country: France
- Region: Bourgogne-Franche-Comté
- Department: Saône-et-Loire
- No. of communes: {{{nbcomm}}}
- Area: 1,430.2 km^{2} (552.2 sq mi)
- Population (2023): 67,890
  - Density: 47.47/km^{2} (122.9/sq mi)
- INSEE code: 714

The arrondissement of Louhans is an arrondissement of France in the Saône-et-Loire department in the Bourgogne-Franche-Comté region. It has 88 communes. Its population is 67,238 (2021), and its area is 1,430.2 km^{2} (552.2 sq mi).

== Composition ==
The communes of the arrondissement of Louhans, and their INSEE codes, are:

1. L'Abergement-de-Cuisery (71001)
2. L'Abergement-Sainte-Colombe (71002)
3. Authumes (71013)
4. Bantanges (71018)
5. Baudrières (71023)
6. Beaurepaire-en-Bresse (71027)
7. Beauvernois (71028)
8. Bellevesvre (71029)
9. Bosjean (71044)
10. Bouhans (71045)
11. Branges (71056)
12. Brienne (71061)
13. Bruailles (71064)
14. Champagnat (71079)
15. La Chapelle-Naude (71092)
16. La Chapelle-Saint-Sauveur (71093)
17. La Chapelle-Thècle (71097)
18. Charette-Varennes (71101)
19. La Chaux (71121)
20. Condal (71143)
21. Cuiseaux (71157)
22. Cuisery (71158)
23. Dampierre-en-Bresse (71168)
24. Devrouze (71173)
25. Diconne (71175)
26. Dommartin-lès-Cuiseaux (71177)
27. Le Fay (71196)
28. Flacey-en-Bresse (71198)
29. Frangy-en-Bresse (71205)
30. La Frette (71206)
31. Fretterans (71207)
32. Frontenard (71208)
33. Frontenaud (71209)
34. La Genête (71213)
35. Huilly-sur-Seille (71234)
36. Joudes (71243)
37. Jouvençon (71244)
38. Juif (71246)
39. Lays-sur-le-Doubs (71254)
40. Lessard-en-Bresse (71256)
41. Loisy (71261)
42. Louhans-Châteaurenaud (71263)
43. Ménetreuil (71293)
44. Mervans (71295)
45. Le Miroir (71300)
46. Montagny-près-Louhans (71303)
47. Montcony (71311)
48. Montjay (71314)
49. Montpont-en-Bresse (71318)
50. Montret (71319)
51. Mouthier-en-Bresse (71326)
52. Ormes (71332)
53. Ouroux-sur-Saône (71336)
54. Pierre-de-Bresse (71351)
55. Le Planois (71352)
56. Pourlans (71357)
57. La Racineuse (71364)
58. Rancy (71365)
59. Ratenelle (71366)
60. Ratte (71367)
61. Romenay (71373)
62. Sagy (71379)
63. Saillenard (71380)
64. Saint-André-en-Bresse (71386)
65. Saint-Bonnet-en-Bresse (71396)
66. Saint-Christophe-en-Bresse (71398)
67. Sainte-Croix-en-Bresse (71401)
68. Saint-Étienne-en-Bresse (71410)
69. Saint-Germain-du-Bois (71419)
70. Saint-Germain-du-Plain (71420)
71. Saint-Martin-du-Mont (71454)
72. Saint-Usuge (71484)
73. Saint-Vincent-en-Bresse (71489)
74. Savigny-en-Revermont (71506)
75. Savigny-sur-Seille (71508)
76. Sens-sur-Seille (71514)
77. Serley (71516)
78. Serrigny-en-Bresse (71519)
79. Simandre (71522)
80. Simard (71523)
81. Sornay (71528)
82. Le Tartre (71534)
83. Thurey (71538)
84. Torpes (71541)
85. Tronchy (71548)
86. Varennes-Saint-Sauveur (71558)
87. Vérissey (71568)
88. Vincelles (71580)

== History ==
The arrondissement of Louhans was created in 1800, disbanded in 1926 and restored in 1942. In January 2017 it gained seven communes from the arrondissement of Chalon-sur-Saône and two communes from the arrondissement of Mâcon.

As a result of the reorganisation of the cantons of France which came into effect in 2015, the borders of the cantons are no longer related to the borders of the arrondissements. The cantons of the arrondissement of Louhans were, as of January 2015:

1. Beaurepaire-en-Bresse
2. Cuiseaux
3. Cuisery
4. Louhans
5. Montpont-en-Bresse
6. Montret
7. Pierre-de-Bresse
8. Saint-Germain-du-Bois
