= Montagny-près-Louhans =

- Commune
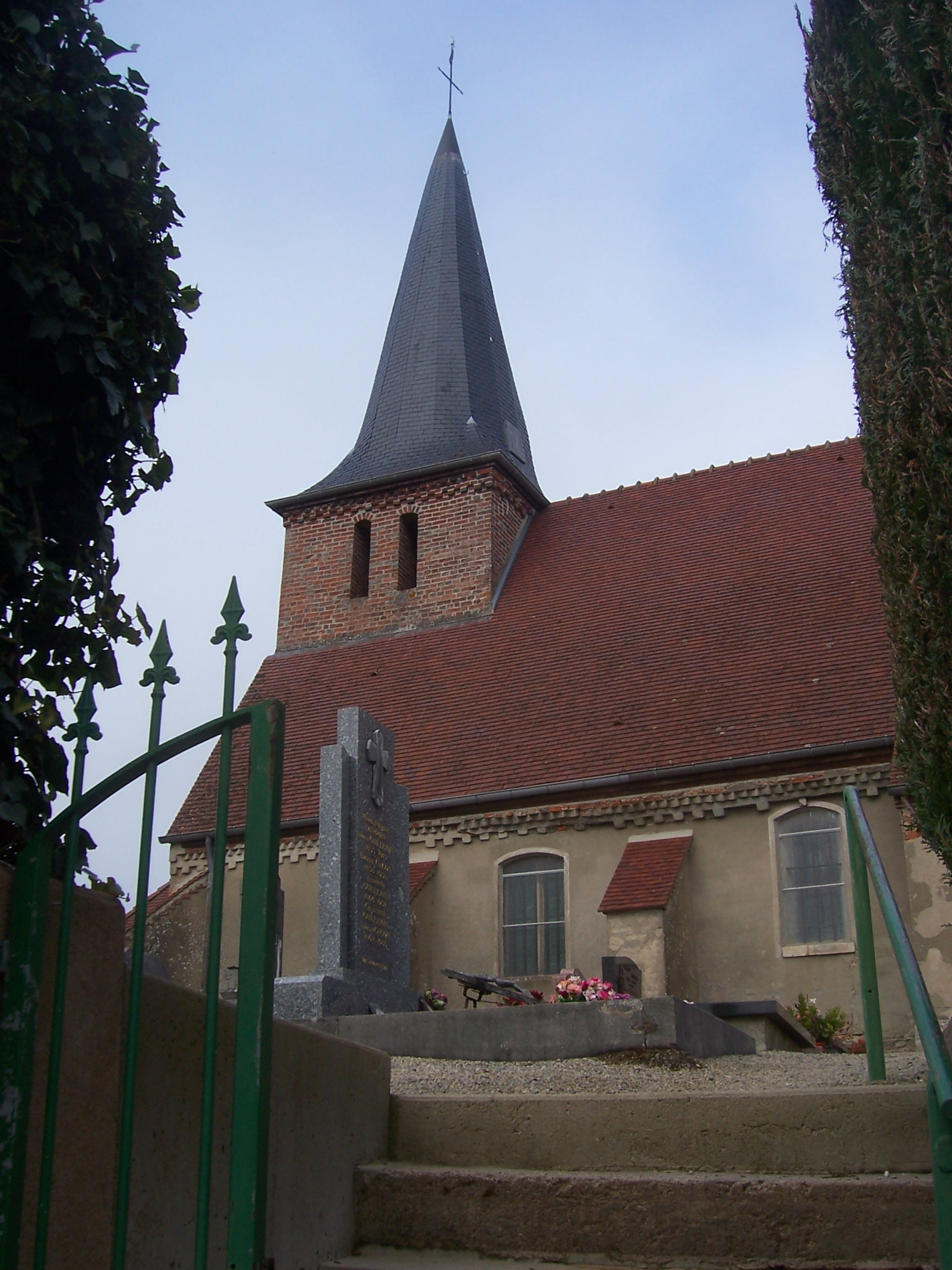
- The church in Montagny-près-Louhans
- Location of Montagny-près-Louhans
- Location within France Location within Bourgogne-Franche-Comté
- Coordinates: 46°39′33″N 5°16′14″E
- Country: France
- Region: Bourgogne-Franche-Comté
- Department: Saône-et-Loire
- Arrondissement: Louhans
- Canton: Louhans

Government
  - Mayor (2020–2026): Jacky Bonin
- Area^{1}: 9.51 km^{2} (3.67 sq mi)
- Elevation: 195 m (640 ft)
- Highest elevation: 208 m (682 ft)
- Lowest elevation: 178 m (584 ft)
- Population (2023): 489
  - Density: 51.4/km^{2} (133/sq mi)
- Time zone: UTC+01:00 (CET)
  - Summer (DST): UTC+02:00 (CEST)
- INSEE/Postal code: 71303 /71500
- ^{1} French Land Register data, which excludes lakes, ponds, glaciers > 1 km^{2} (0.386 sq mi or 247 acres) and river estuaries.

Montagny-près-Louhans (French pronunciation: [mɔ̃taɲi pʁɛ lu.ɑ̃], literally Montagny near Louhans) is a commune in the Saône-et-Loire department in the region of Bourgogne-Franche-Comté in eastern France.

== See also ==
- Communes of the Saône-et-Loire department
