= Saint-Vincent-en-Bresse =

- Commune
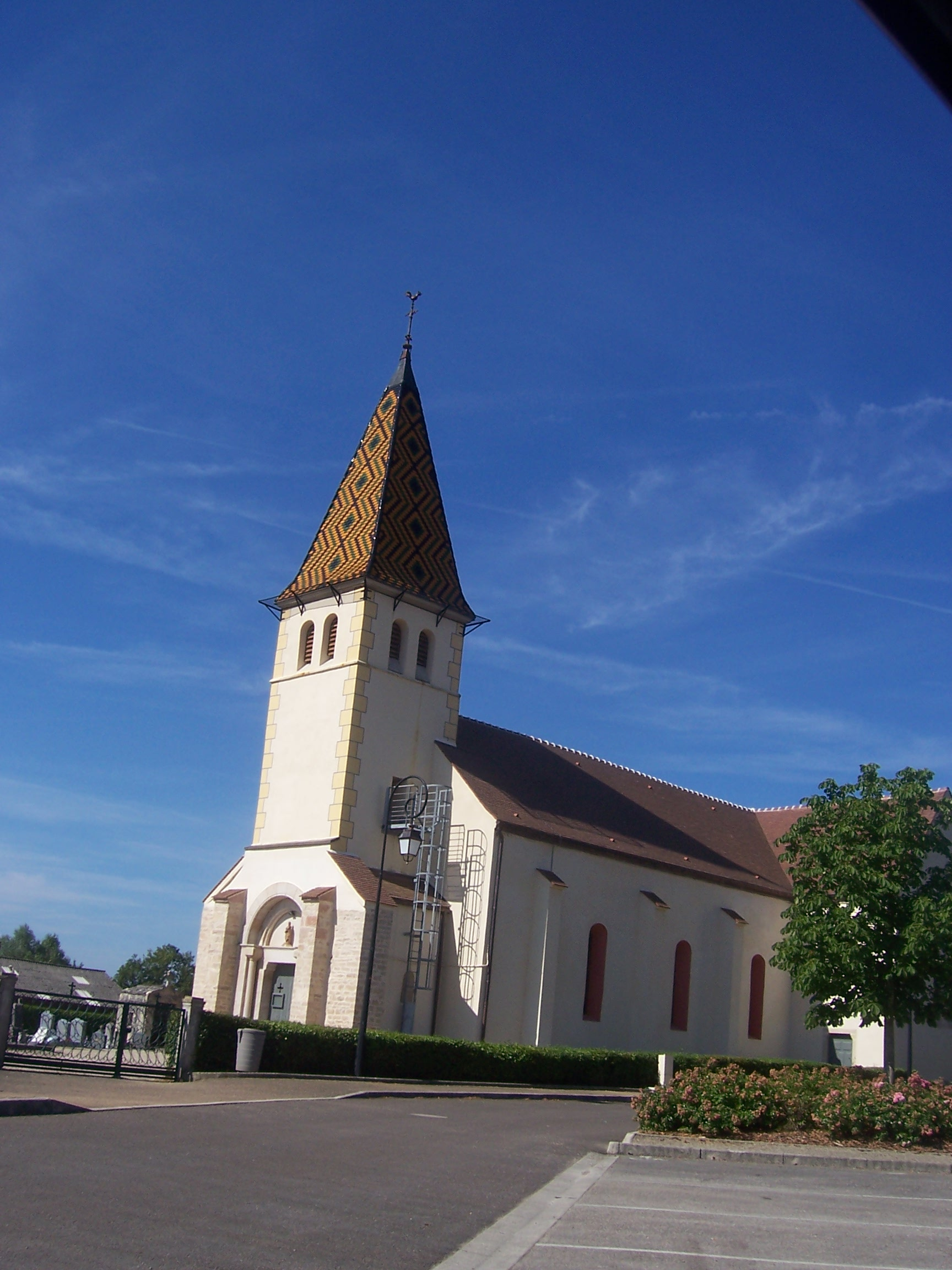
- The church in Saint-Vincent-en-Bresse

- Coat of arms
- Location of Saint-Vincent-en-Bresse
- Location within France Location within Bourgogne-Franche-Comté
- Coordinates: 46°40′01″N 5°03′42″E
- Country: France
- Region: Bourgogne-Franche-Comté
- Department: Saône-et-Loire
- Arrondissement: Louhans
- Canton: Louhans

Government
  - Mayor (2020–2026): Bruno Favette
- Area^{1}: 15.75 km^{2} (6.08 sq mi)
- Elevation: 475 m (1,558 ft)
- Highest elevation: 212 m (696 ft)
- Lowest elevation: 183 m (600 ft)
- Population (2023): 586
  - Density: 37.2/km^{2} (96.4/sq mi)
- Time zone: UTC+01:00 (CET)
  - Summer (DST): UTC+02:00 (CEST)
- INSEE/Postal code: 71489 /71440
- ^{1} French Land Register data, which excludes lakes, ponds, glaciers > 1 km^{2} (0.386 sq mi or 247 acres) and river estuaries.

Saint-Vincent-en-Bresse (French pronunciation: [sɛ̃ vɛ̃sɑ̃ ɑ̃ bʁɛs], literally Saint-Vincent in Bresse) is a commune in the Saône-et-Loire department in the region of Bourgogne-Franche-Comté in eastern France.

It lies 22 km (14 mi) southeast of Chalon-sur-Saône and 16 km (10 mi) west-northwest of Louhans.

== Population ==
Historical population
Year	Pop.	±% p.a.
1968	412	—
1975	349	−2.34%
1982	365	+0.64%
1990	420	+1.77%
1999	468	+1.21%
2007	457	−0.30%
2012	526	+2.85%
2017	573	+1.73%
2023	586	+0.37%
Source: INSEE

== Sights ==
There are ruins of a medieval castle southeast of the town.

== Name ==
The place name, formerly Saint-Vincent-en-Braisse, Latin Sanctus Vincentius in Brixia derives from that of St. Vincent born in Zaragoza, martyred at Valencia in 304 during Diocletian's persecutions.

== See also ==
- Communes of the Saône-et-Loire department
