= Sagy =

Sagy may refer to:

- Sagy, Saône-et-Loire a commune in the French region of Bourgogne
- Sagy, Val-d'Oise, a commune in the French region of Île-de-France
