= Saint-Martin-du-Mont, Saône-et-Loire =

Saint-Martin-du-Mont
- Commune
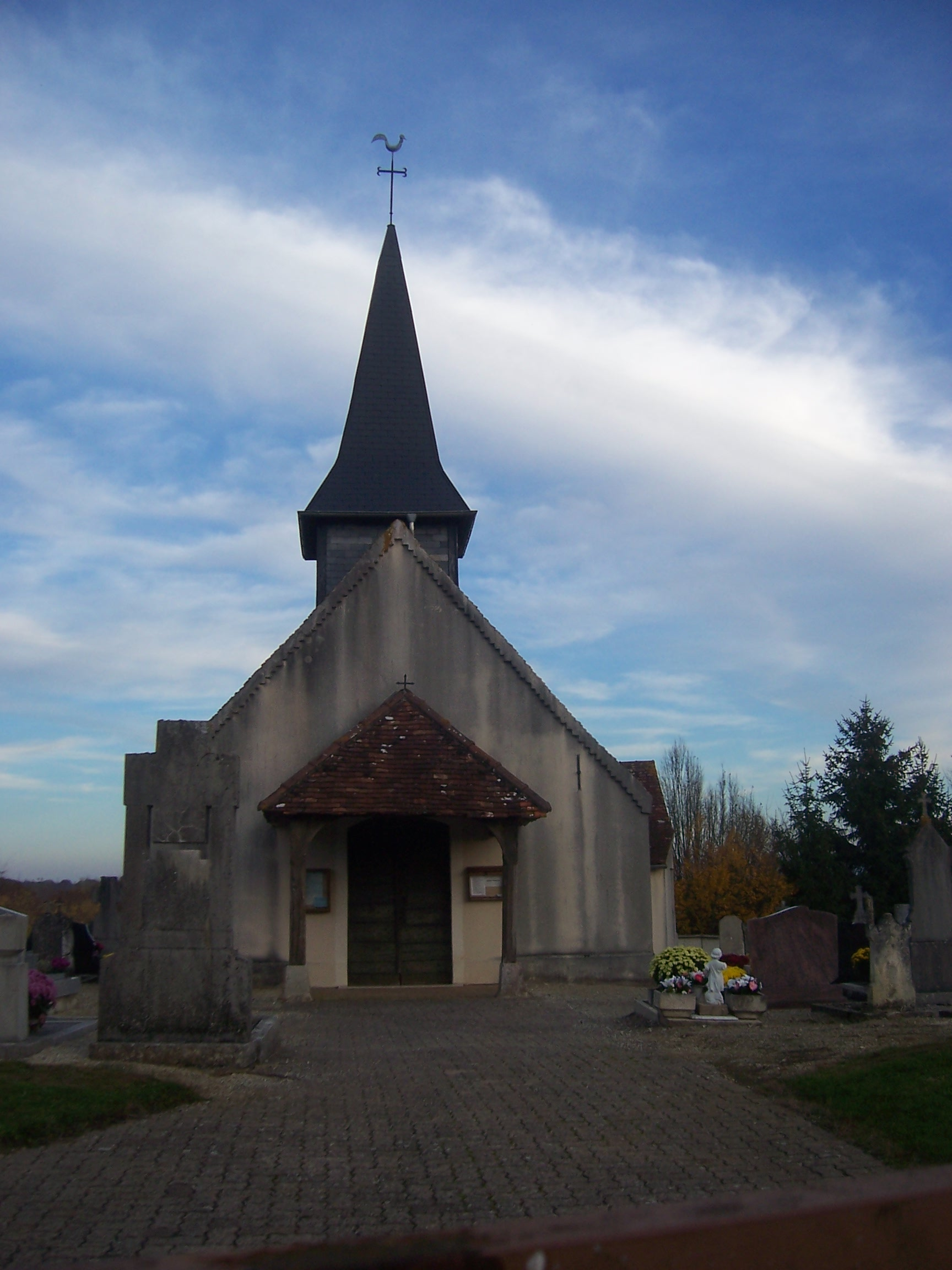
- The church in Saint-Martin-du-Mont

- Coat of arms
- Location of Saint-Martin-du-Mont
- Location within France Location within Bourgogne-Franche-Comté
- Coordinates: 46°36′51″N 5°17′41″E
- Country: France
- Region: Bourgogne-Franche-Comté
- Department: Saône-et-Loire
- Arrondissement: Louhans
- Canton: Louhans
- Area^{1}: 5.26 km^{2} (2.03 sq mi)
- Elevation: 207 m (679 ft)
- Highest elevation: 204 m (669 ft)
- Lowest elevation: 181 m (594 ft)
- Population (2023): 174
  - Density: 33.1/km^{2} (85.7/sq mi)
- Time zone: UTC+01:00 (CET)
  - Summer (DST): UTC+02:00 (CEST)
- INSEE/Postal code: 71454 /71580
- ^{1} French Land Register data, which excludes lakes, ponds, glaciers > 1 km^{2} (0.386 sq mi or 247 acres) and river estuaries.

Saint-Martin-du-Mont (French pronunciation: [sɛ̃ maʁtɛ̃ dy mɔ̃]) is a commune in the Saône-et-Loire department in the region of Bourgogne-Franche-Comté in eastern France.

== Geography ==
The Vallière forms part of the commune's southern border.

== See also ==
- Communes of the Saône-et-Loire department
