= Louhans-Châteaurenaud =

- Subprefecture and commune
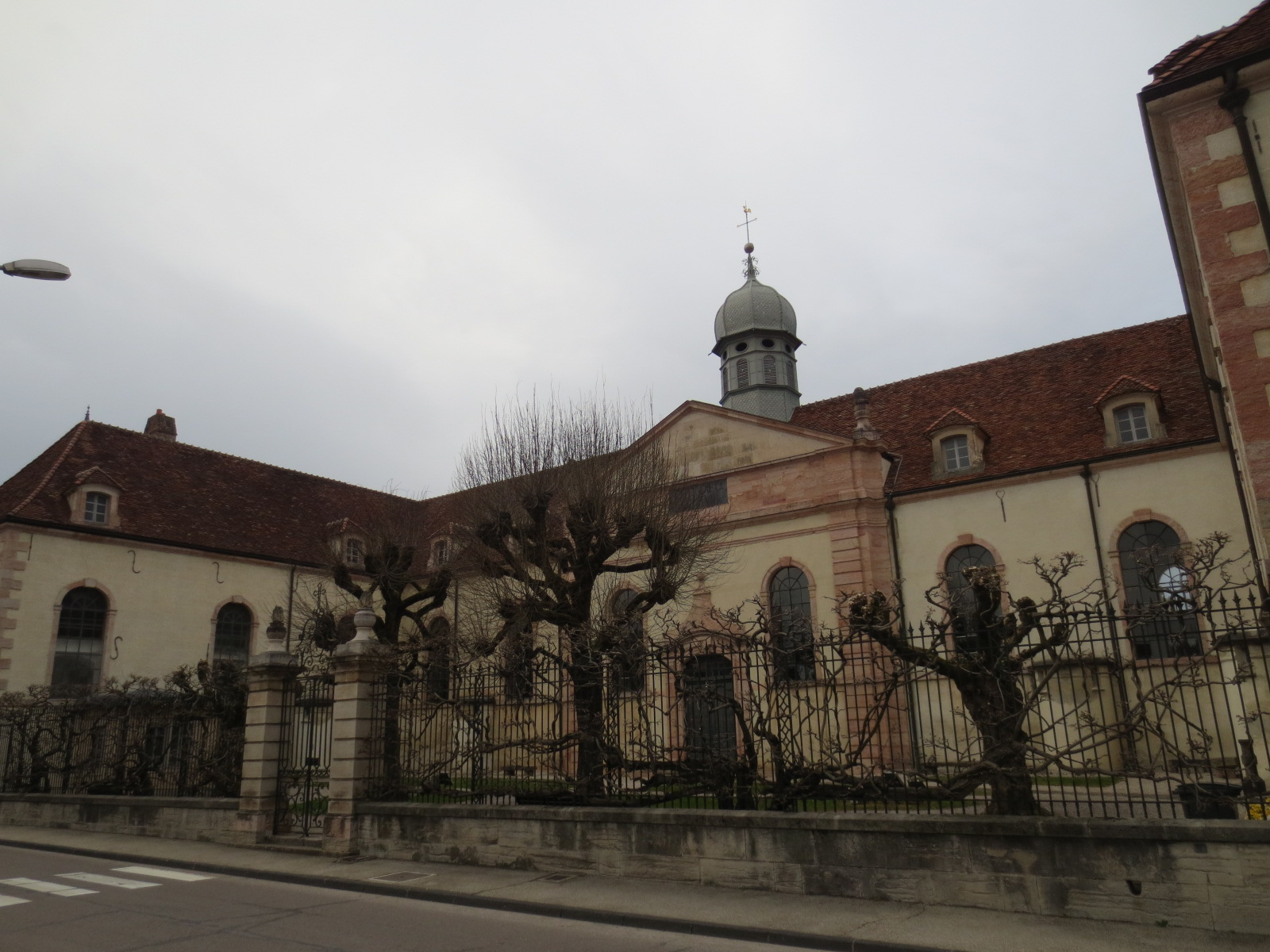
- Hôtel-Dieu

- Coat of arms
- Location of Louhans-Châteaurenaud
- Location within France Location within Bourgogne-Franche-Comté
- Coordinates: 46°39′40″N 5°13′31″E
- Country: France
- Region: Bourgogne-Franche-Comté
- Department: Saône-et-Loire
- Arrondissement: Louhans
- Canton: Louhans

Government
  - Mayor (2020–2026): Frédéric Bouchet
- Area^{1}: 22.58 km^{2} (8.72 sq mi)
- Elevation: 181 m (594 ft)
- Highest elevation: 205 m (673 ft)
- Lowest elevation: 176 m (577 ft)
- Population (2023): 6,446
  - Density: 285.5/km^{2} (739.4/sq mi)
- Time zone: UTC+01:00 (CET)
  - Summer (DST): UTC+02:00 (CEST)
- INSEE/Postal code: 71263 /71500
- ^{1} French Land Register data, which excludes lakes, ponds, glaciers > 1 km^{2} (0.386 sq mi or 247 acres) and river estuaries.

Louhans-Châteaurenaud (before 2026: Louhans, French pronunciation: [lu.ɑ̃]) is a commune in the Saône-et-Loire department in the region of Bourgogne-Franche-Comté in eastern France. Louhans is the capital of Bresse bourguignonne and a subprefecture of the department.

== Geography ==
Louhans-Châteaurenaud is centrally located on the plain of Bresse, a strongly agricultural region in the eastern part of the department of Saône-et-Loire. The Vallière forms part of the commune's southeastern border, then flows into the Solnan, which forms part of the commune's southern border. The Solnan flows into the Seille in the town. The Seille flows south-southwest through the western part of the commune and crosses the town.

== Population ==
The population data given in the table below for 1968 refer to the commune of Louhans(-Châteaurenaud) in its geography at the given dates. In 1973 Louhans absorbed the former communes of Châteaurenaud, Branges and Sornay. In 1979 Branges and Sornay were re-established as independent communes.

Historical population

Year	Pop.	±% p.a.
1793	3,375	—
1800	2,849	−2.39%
1806	3,151	+1.69%
1821	3,159	+0.02%
1831	3,170	+0.03%
1836	3,674	+2.99%
1841	3,686	+0.07%
1846	3,817	+0.70%
1851	3,853	+0.19%
1856	3,644	−1.11%
1861	3,768	+0.67%
1866	3,871	+0.54%
1872	3,913	+0.18%
1876	4,163	+1.56%
1881	4,284	+0.57%
1886	4,329	+0.21%
1891	4,548	+0.99%
1896	4,538	−0.04%
1901	4,469	−0.31%

Year	Pop.	±% p.a.
1906	4,494	+0.11%
1911	4,454	−0.18%
1921	4,116	−0.79%
1926	4,144	+0.14%
1931	4,116	−0.14%
1936	4,130	+0.07%
1946	4,120	−0.02%
1954	4,092	−0.09%
1962	4,154	+0.19%
1968	4,200	+0.18%
1975	10,507	+14.00%
1982	6,483	−6.67%
1990	6,140	−0.68%
1999	6,237	+0.17%
2007	6,420	+0.36%
2012	6,461	+0.13%
2017	6,365	−0.30%
2023	6,446	+0.21%

Source: EHESS and INSEE (2007-2023)

== Sights ==
The town's church has a fine tower of the 15th century, of which the balustrade is carved so as to form the first words of the Ave Maria. There are also a hospital of the 17th century with a collection of ancient earthenware, a town hall of the 18th century and remains of ramparts of the 16th and 17th century.

== Gallery ==
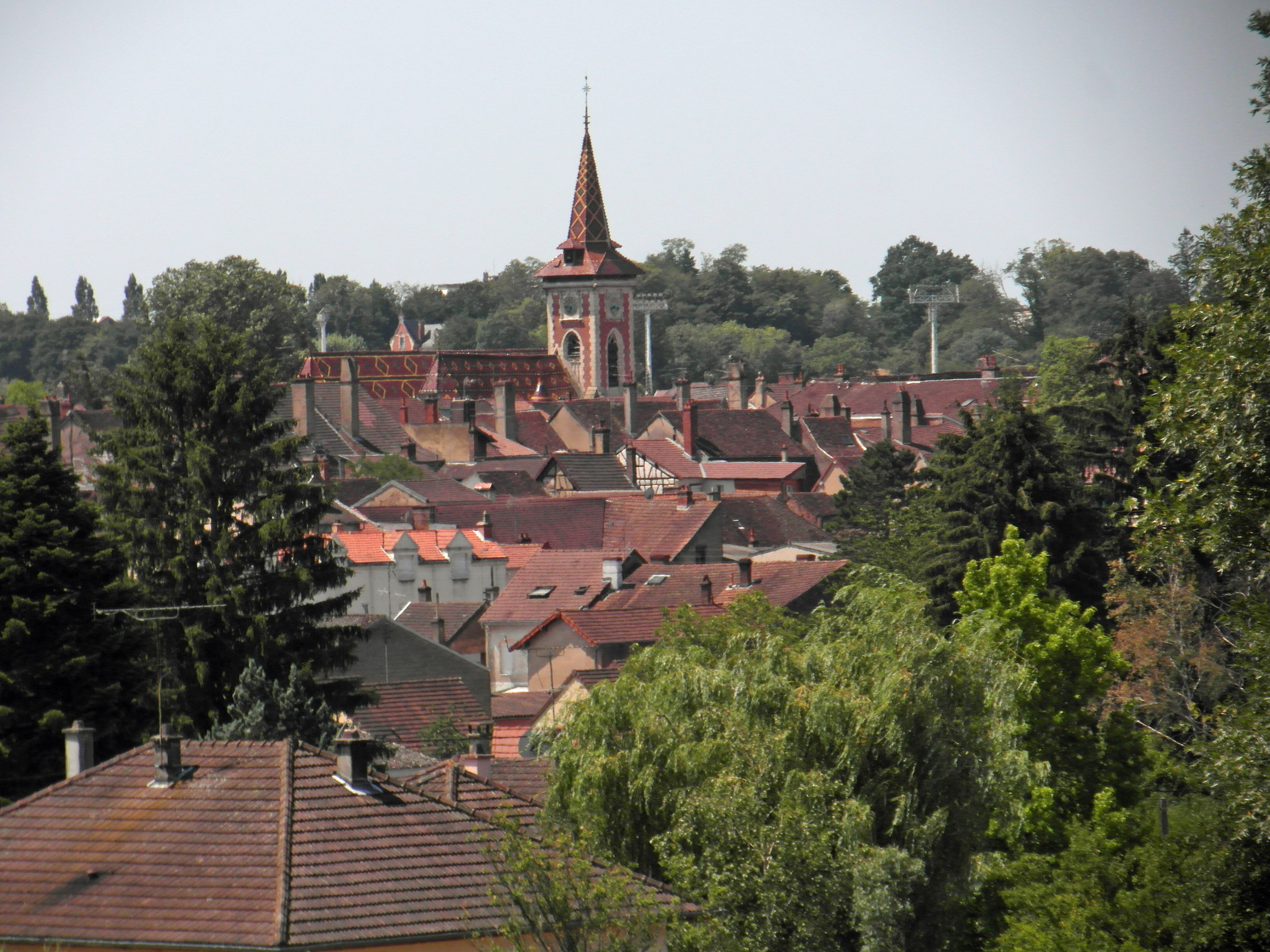
Town center seen from Châteaurenaud

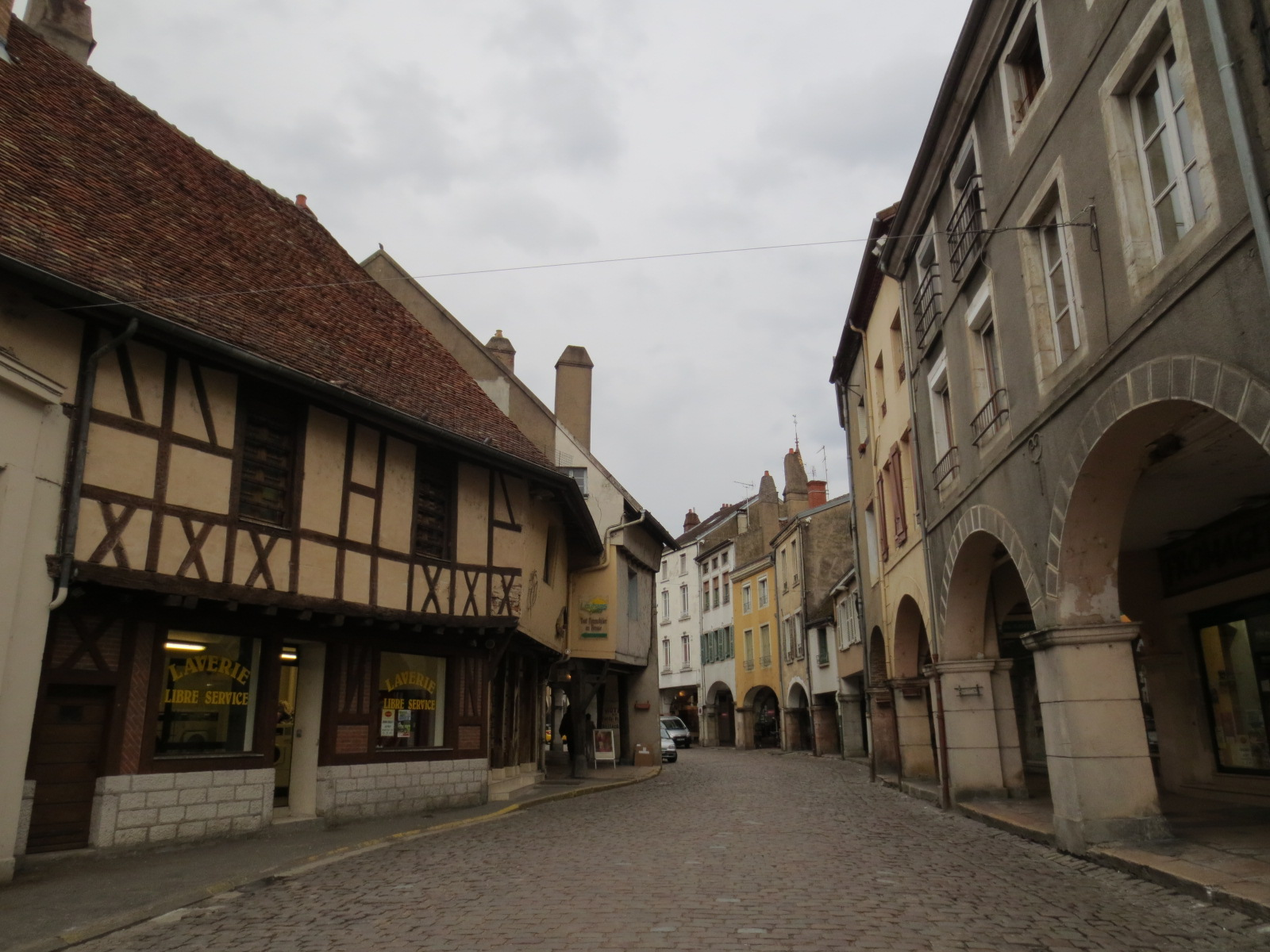
Arcades in town center

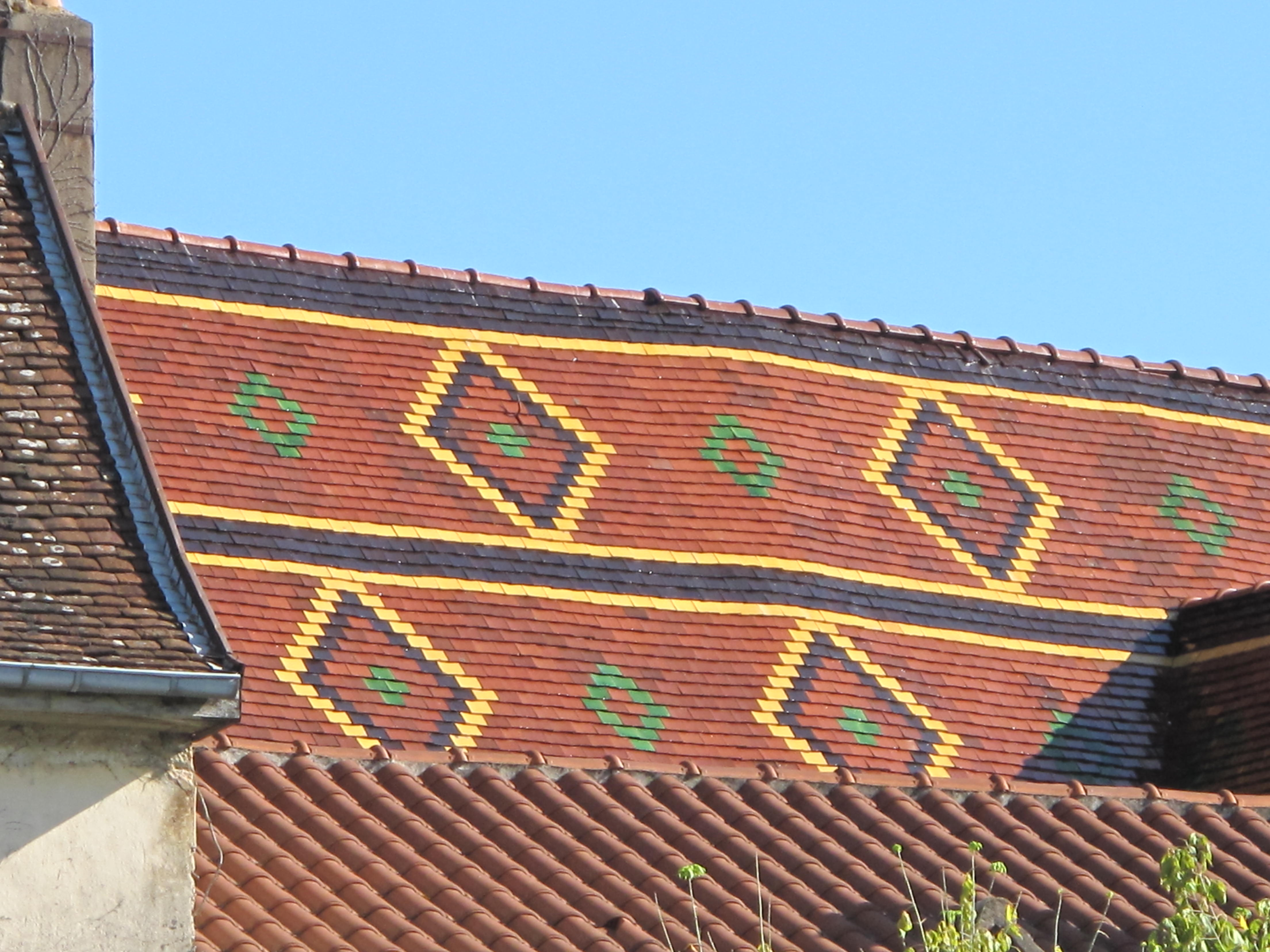
Burgundian tiled roof of the church

== See also ==
- CS Louhans-Cuiseaux
- Communes of the Saône-et-Loire department
