= Simard, Saône-et-Loire =

Simard
- Commune
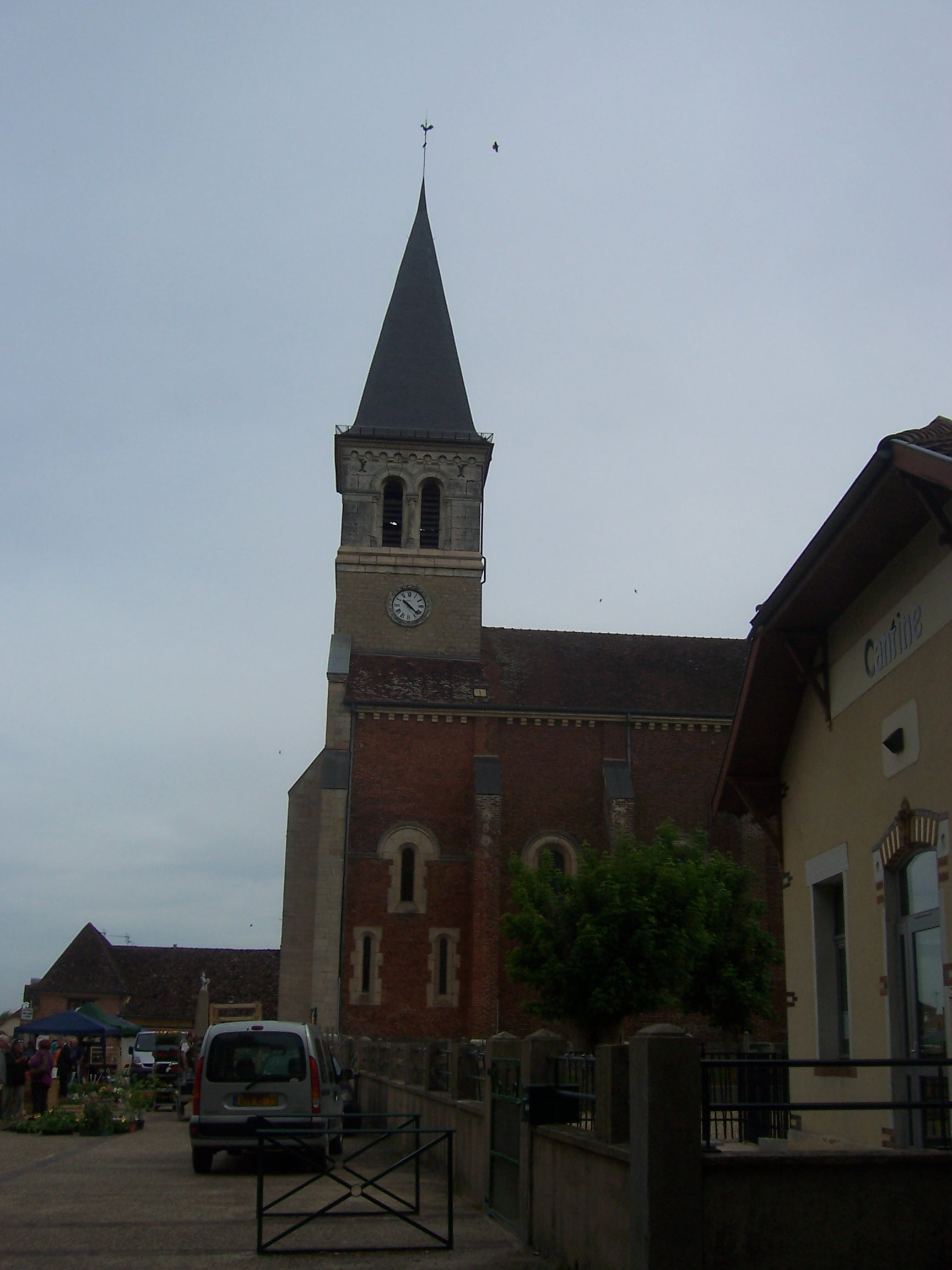
- The church in Simard

- Coat of arms
- Location of Simard
- Location within France Location within Bourgogne-Franche-Comté
- Coordinates: 46°43′19″N 5°10′54″E
- Country: France
- Region: Bourgogne-Franche-Comté
- Department: Saône-et-Loire
- Arrondissement: Louhans
- Canton: Louhans
- Area^{1}: 22.12 km^{2} (8.54 sq mi)
- Elevation: 211 m (692 ft)
- Highest elevation: 212 m (696 ft)
- Lowest elevation: 187 m (614 ft)
- Population (2023): 1,175
  - Density: 53.12/km^{2} (137.6/sq mi)
- Time zone: UTC+01:00 (CET)
  - Summer (DST): UTC+02:00 (CEST)
- INSEE/Postal code: 71523 /71330
- ^{1} French Land Register data, which excludes lakes, ponds, glaciers > 1 km^{2} (0.386 sq mi or 247 acres) and river estuaries.

Simard (French pronunciation: [simaʁ]) is a commune in the Saône-et-Loire department in the region of Bourgogne-Franche-Comté in eastern France.

== See also ==
- Communes of the Saône-et-Loire department
