= Vincelles, Saône-et-Loire =

Vincelles
- Commune
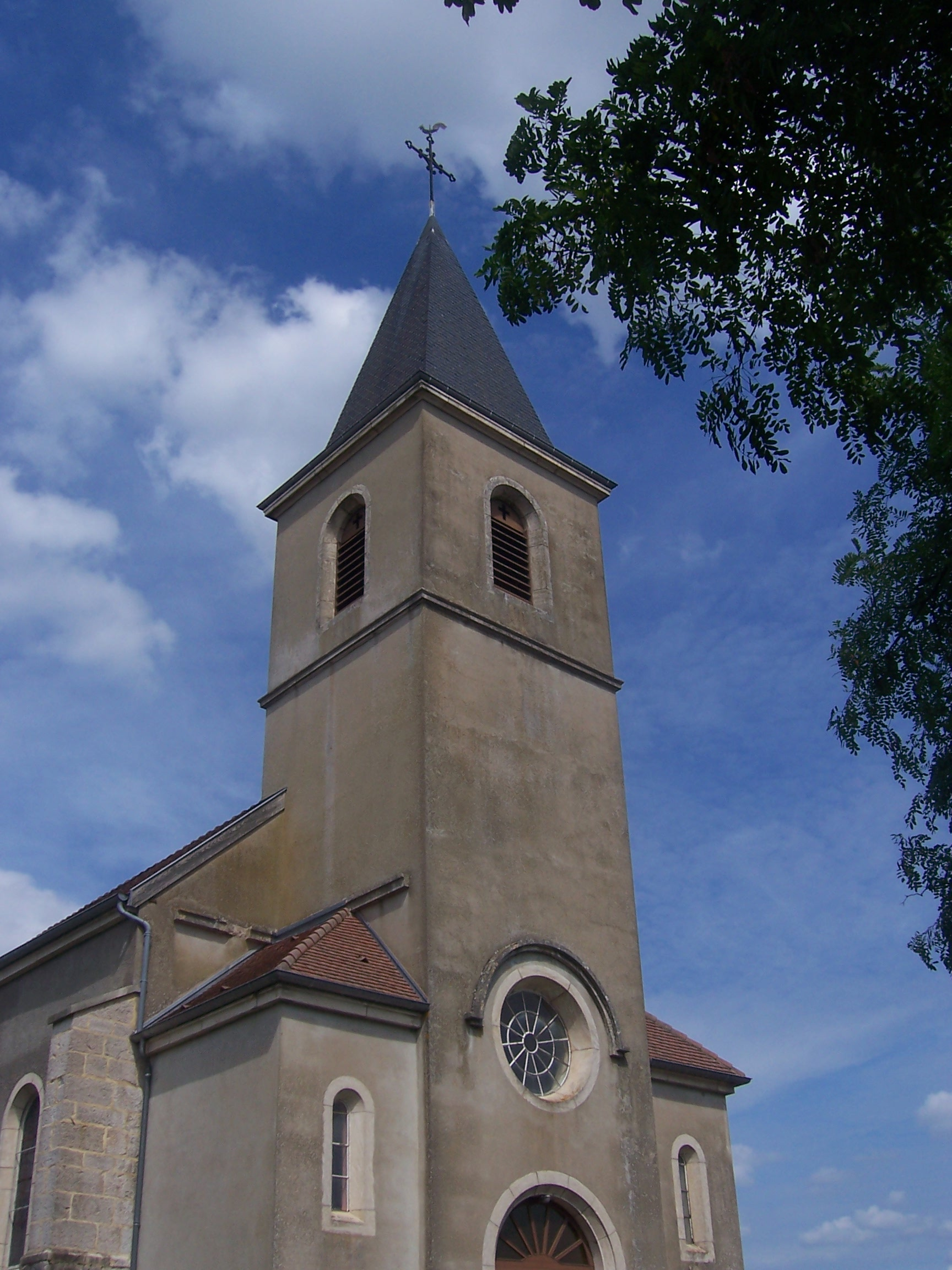
- The church in Vincelles

- Coat of arms
- Location of Vincelles
- Location within France Location within Bourgogne-Franche-Comté
- Coordinates: 46°39′37″N 5°14′13″E
- Country: France
- Region: Bourgogne-Franche-Comté
- Department: Saône-et-Loire
- Arrondissement: Louhans
- Canton: Louhans

Government
  - Mayor (2020–2026): Mickaël Chevrey
- Area^{1}: 5.61 km^{2} (2.17 sq mi)
- Elevation: 208 m (682 ft)
- Highest elevation: 204 m (669 ft)
- Lowest elevation: 177 m (581 ft)
- Population (2023): 467
  - Density: 83.2/km^{2} (216/sq mi)
- Time zone: UTC+01:00 (CET)
  - Summer (DST): UTC+02:00 (CEST)
- INSEE/Postal code: 71580 /71500
- ^{1} French Land Register data, which excludes lakes, ponds, glaciers > 1 km^{2} (0.386 sq mi or 247 acres) and river estuaries.

Vincelles (French pronunciation: [vɛ̃sɛl]) is a commune in the Saône-et-Loire department in the region of Bourgogne-Franche-Comté in eastern France.

== See also ==
- Communes of the Saône-et-Loire department
