= Montret =

- Commune
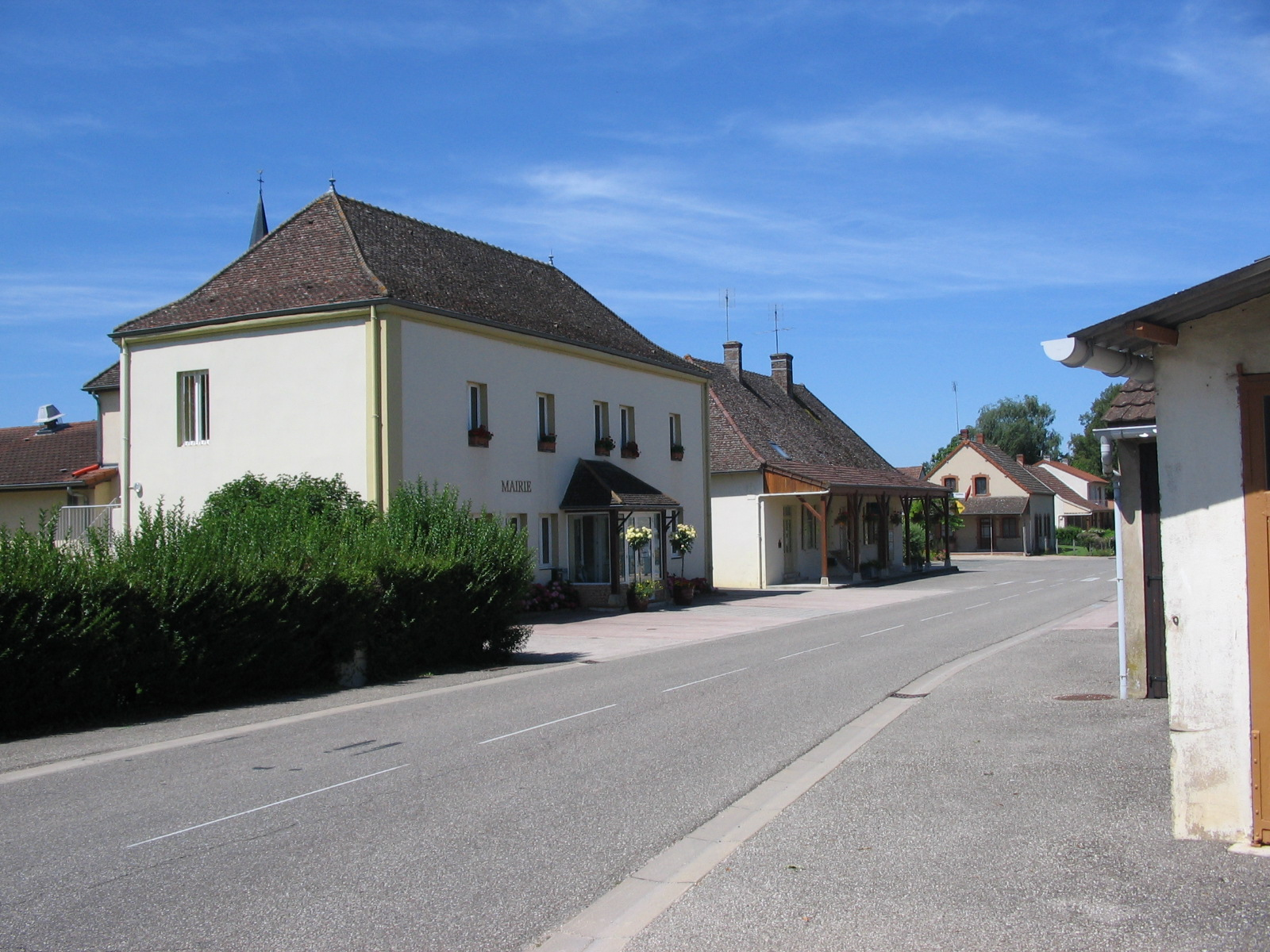
- Town hall

- Coat of arms
- Location of Montret
- Location within France Location within Bourgogne-Franche-Comté
- Coordinates: 46°40′45″N 5°06′49″E
- Country: France
- Region: Bourgogne-Franche-Comté
- Department: Saône-et-Loire
- Arrondissement: Louhans
- Canton: Louhans
- Area^{1}: 14.59 km^{2} (5.63 sq mi)
- Elevation: 207 m (679 ft)
- Highest elevation: 210 m (690 ft)
- Lowest elevation: 183 m (600 ft)
- Population (2023): 763
  - Density: 52.3/km^{2} (135/sq mi)
- Time zone: UTC+01:00 (CET)
  - Summer (DST): UTC+02:00 (CEST)
- INSEE/Postal code: 71319 /71440
- ^{1} French Land Register data, which excludes lakes, ponds, glaciers > 1 km^{2} (0.386 sq mi or 247 acres) and river estuaries.

Montret (French pronunciation: [mɔ̃tʁɛ]) is a commune in the Saône-et-Loire department in the region of Bourgogne-Franche-Comté in eastern France.

== See also ==
- Communes of the Saône-et-Loire department
