= Saint-André-en-Bresse =

- Commune
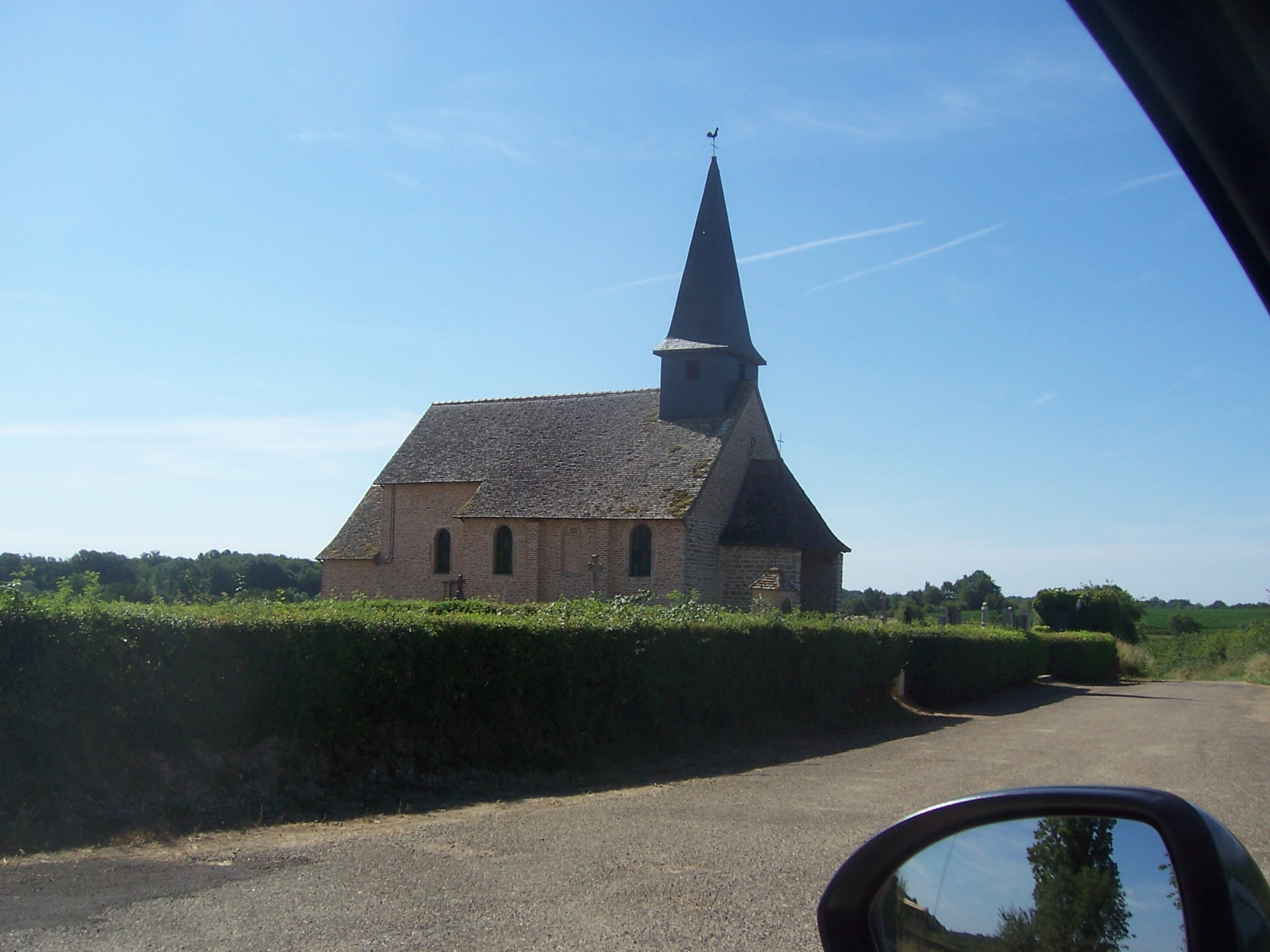
- The church in Saint-André-en-Bresse
- Location of Saint-André-en-Bresse
- Location within France Location within Bourgogne-Franche-Comté
- Coordinates: 46°39′11″N 5°05′26″E
- Country: France
- Region: Bourgogne-Franche-Comté
- Department: Saône-et-Loire
- Arrondissement: Louhans
- Canton: Louhans
- Area^{1}: 4.86 km^{2} (1.88 sq mi)
- Elevation: 190 m (620 ft)
- Highest elevation: 210 m (690 ft)
- Lowest elevation: 181 m (594 ft)
- Population (2023): 136
  - Density: 28.0/km^{2} (72.5/sq mi)
- Time zone: UTC+01:00 (CET)
  - Summer (DST): UTC+02:00 (CEST)
- INSEE/Postal code: 71386 /71440
- ^{1} French Land Register data, which excludes lakes, ponds, glaciers > 1 km^{2} (0.386 sq mi or 247 acres) and river estuaries.

Saint-André-en-Bresse (French pronunciation: [sɛ̃.t‿ɑ̃dʁe ɑ̃ bʁɛs], literally Saint-André in Bresse) is a commune in the Saône-et-Loire department in the region of Bourgogne-Franche-Comté in eastern France.

== See also ==
- Communes of the Saône-et-Loire department
