= Montcony =

- Commune
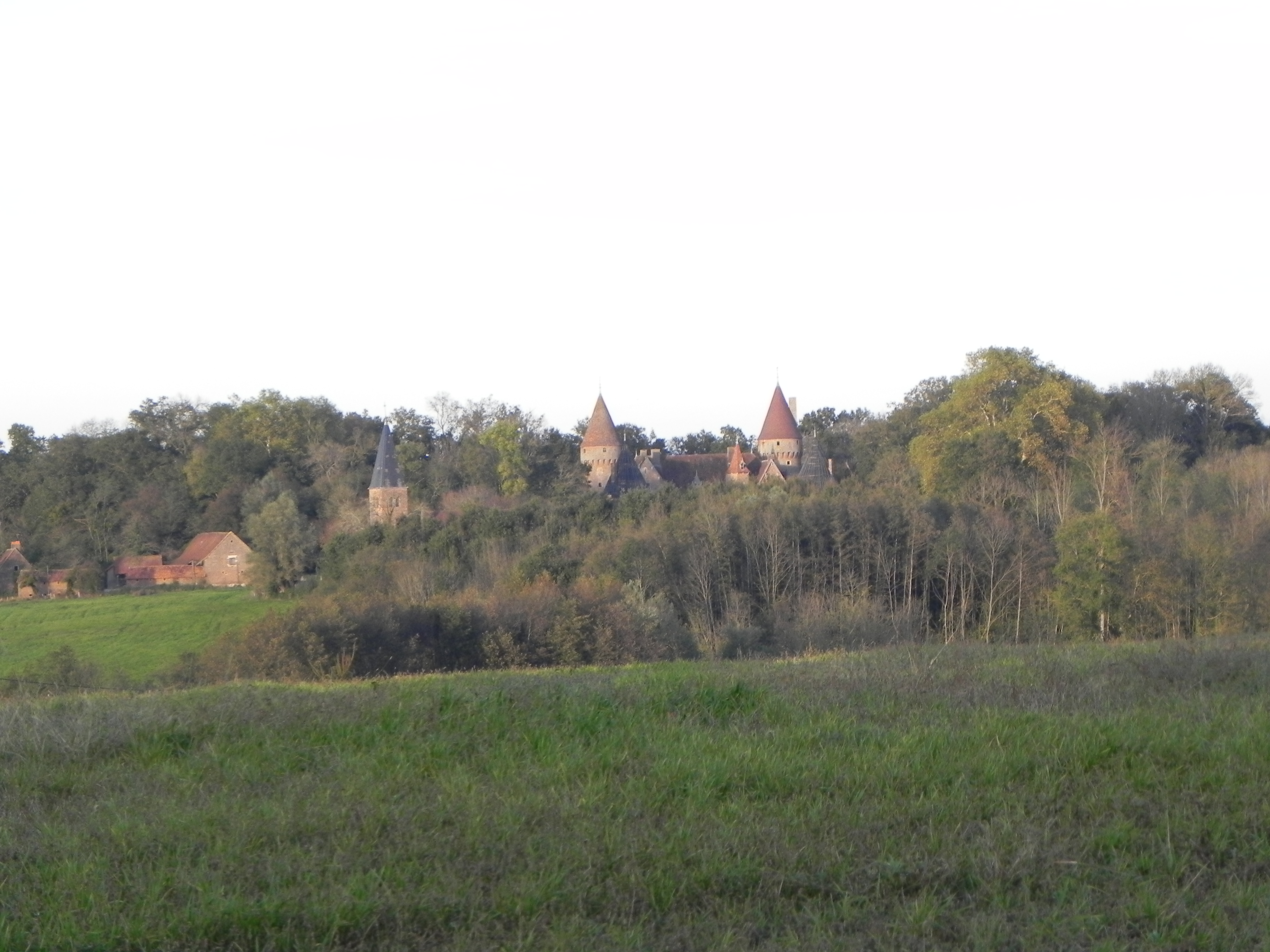
- Chateau
- Location of Montcony
- Location within France Location within Bourgogne-Franche-Comté
- Coordinates: 46°42′00″N 5°17′40″E
- Country: France
- Region: Bourgogne-Franche-Comté
- Department: Saône-et-Loire
- Arrondissement: Louhans
- Canton: Louhans

Government
  - Mayor (2020–2026): Rémy Chatot
- Area^{1}: 10.74 km^{2} (4.15 sq mi)
- Elevation: 206 m (676 ft)
- Highest elevation: 210 m (690 ft)
- Lowest elevation: 179 m (587 ft)
- Population (2023): 252
  - Density: 23.5/km^{2} (60.8/sq mi)
- Time zone: UTC+01:00 (CET)
  - Summer (DST): UTC+02:00 (CEST)
- INSEE/Postal code: 71311 /71500
- ^{1} French Land Register data, which excludes lakes, ponds, glaciers > 1 km^{2} (0.386 sq mi or 247 acres) and river estuaries.

Montcony (French pronunciation: [mɔ̃kɔni]) is a commune in the Saône-et-Loire department in the region of Bourgogne-Franche-Comté in eastern France.

== Sights ==
- Chateau

== See also ==
- Communes of the Saône-et-Loire department
