= Saint-Étienne-en-Bresse =

- Commune
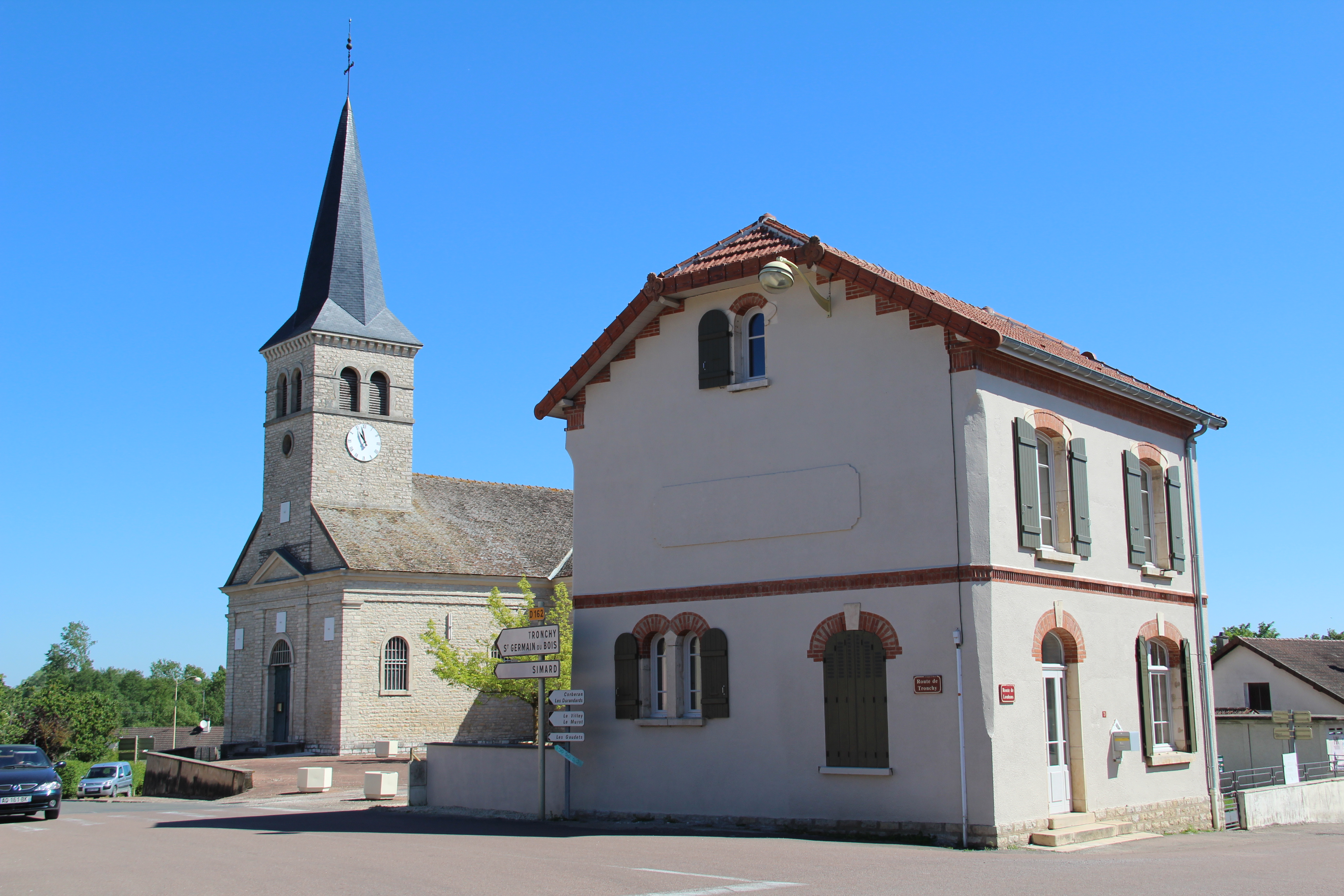
- The church and old post office in Saint-Étienne-en-Bresse
- Location of Saint-Étienne-en-Bresse
- Location within France Location within Bourgogne-Franche-Comté
- Coordinates: 46°42′25″N 5°03′09″E
- Country: France
- Region: Bourgogne-Franche-Comté
- Department: Saône-et-Loire
- Arrondissement: Louhans
- Canton: Louhans
- Area^{1}: 19.41 km^{2} (7.49 sq mi)
- Elevation: 190 m (620 ft)
- Highest elevation: 210 m (690 ft)
- Lowest elevation: 180 m (590 ft)
- Population (2023): 825
  - Density: 42.5/km^{2} (110/sq mi)
- Time zone: UTC+01:00 (CET)
  - Summer (DST): UTC+02:00 (CEST)
- INSEE/Postal code: 71410 /71370
- ^{1} French Land Register data, which excludes lakes, ponds, glaciers > 1 km^{2} (0.386 sq mi or 247 acres) and river estuaries.

Saint-Étienne-en-Bresse (French pronunciation: [sɛ̃.t‿etjɛn ɑ̃ bʁɛs], literally Saint-Étienne in Bresse) is a commune in the Saône-et-Loire department in the region of Bourgogne-Franche-Comté in eastern France.

== See also ==
- Communes of the Saône-et-Loire department
