= Ratte, Saône-et-Loire =

Ratte
- Commune
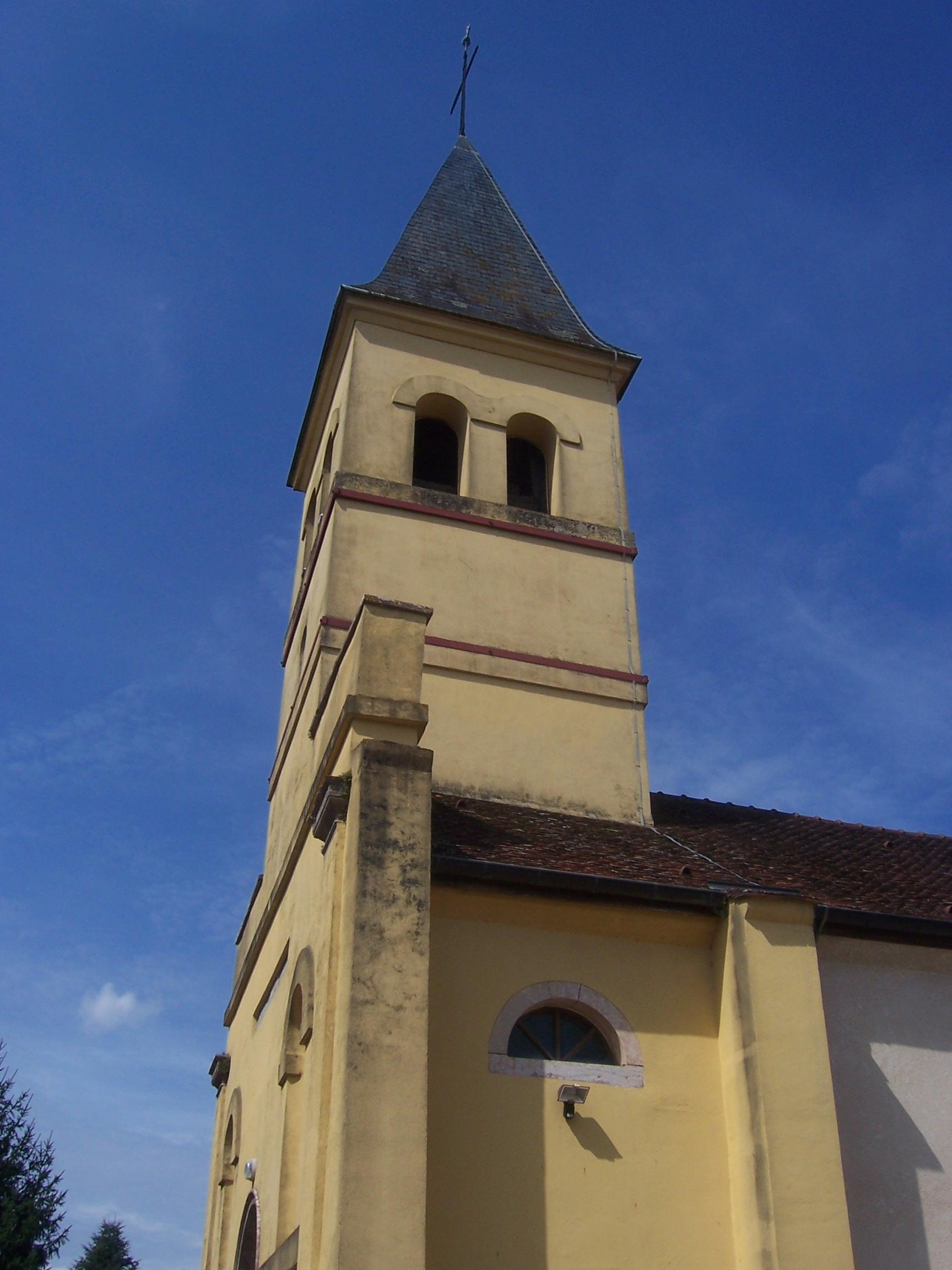
- The church in Ratte
- Location of Ratte
- Location within France Location within Bourgogne-Franche-Comté
- Coordinates: 46°38′45″N 5°18′14″E
- Country: France
- Region: Bourgogne-Franche-Comté
- Department: Saône-et-Loire
- Arrondissement: Louhans
- Canton: Louhans

Government
  - Mayor (2022–2026): Elise Myat
- Area^{1}: 8.99 km^{2} (3.47 sq mi)
- Elevation: 188 m (617 ft)
- Highest elevation: 207 m (679 ft)
- Lowest elevation: 182 m (597 ft)
- Population (2023): 372
  - Density: 41.4/km^{2} (107/sq mi)
- Time zone: UTC+01:00 (CET)
  - Summer (DST): UTC+02:00 (CEST)
- INSEE/Postal code: 71367 /71500
- ^{1} French Land Register data, which excludes lakes, ponds, glaciers > 1 km^{2} (0.386 sq mi or 247 acres) and river estuaries.

Ratte (French pronunciation: [ʁat]) is a commune in the Saône-et-Loire department in the region of Bourgogne-Franche-Comté in eastern France.

== See also ==
- Communes of the Saône-et-Loire department
