= Bruailles =

- Commune
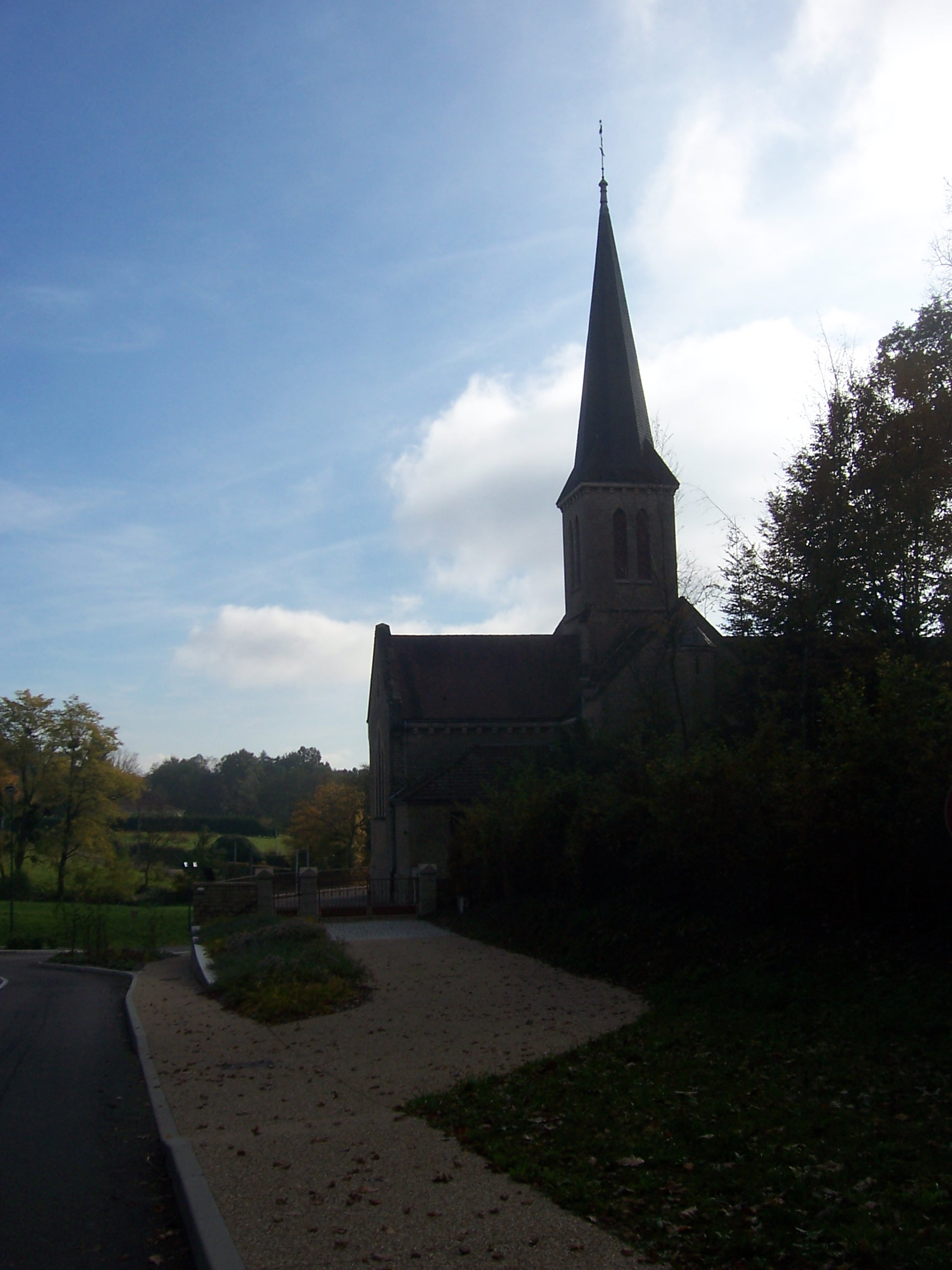
- The church in Bruailles
- Location of Bruailles
- Location within France Location within Bourgogne-Franche-Comté
- Coordinates: 46°35′48″N 5°14′13″E
- Country: France
- Region: Bourgogne-Franche-Comté
- Department: Saône-et-Loire
- Arrondissement: Louhans
- Canton: Louhans

Government
  - Mayor (2020–2026): Martine Morel
- Area^{1}: 22.36 km^{2} (8.63 sq mi)
- Elevation: 206 m (676 ft)
- Highest elevation: 210 m (690 ft)
- Lowest elevation: 177 m (581 ft)
- Population (2023): 984
  - Density: 44.0/km^{2} (114/sq mi)
- Time zone: UTC+01:00 (CET)
  - Summer (DST): UTC+02:00 (CEST)
- INSEE/Postal code: 71064 /71500
- ^{1} French Land Register data, which excludes lakes, ponds, glaciers > 1 km^{2} (0.386 sq mi or 247 acres) and river estuaries.

Bruailles (French pronunciation: [bʁyaj]) is a commune in the Saône-et-Loire department in the region of Bourgogne-Franche-Comté in eastern France.

== Geography ==
The Vallière forms the commune northern border, then flows into the Solnan, which forms the commune's western border.

== See also ==
- Communes of the Saône-et-Loire department
