= Juif, Saône-et-Loire =

Juif
- Commune
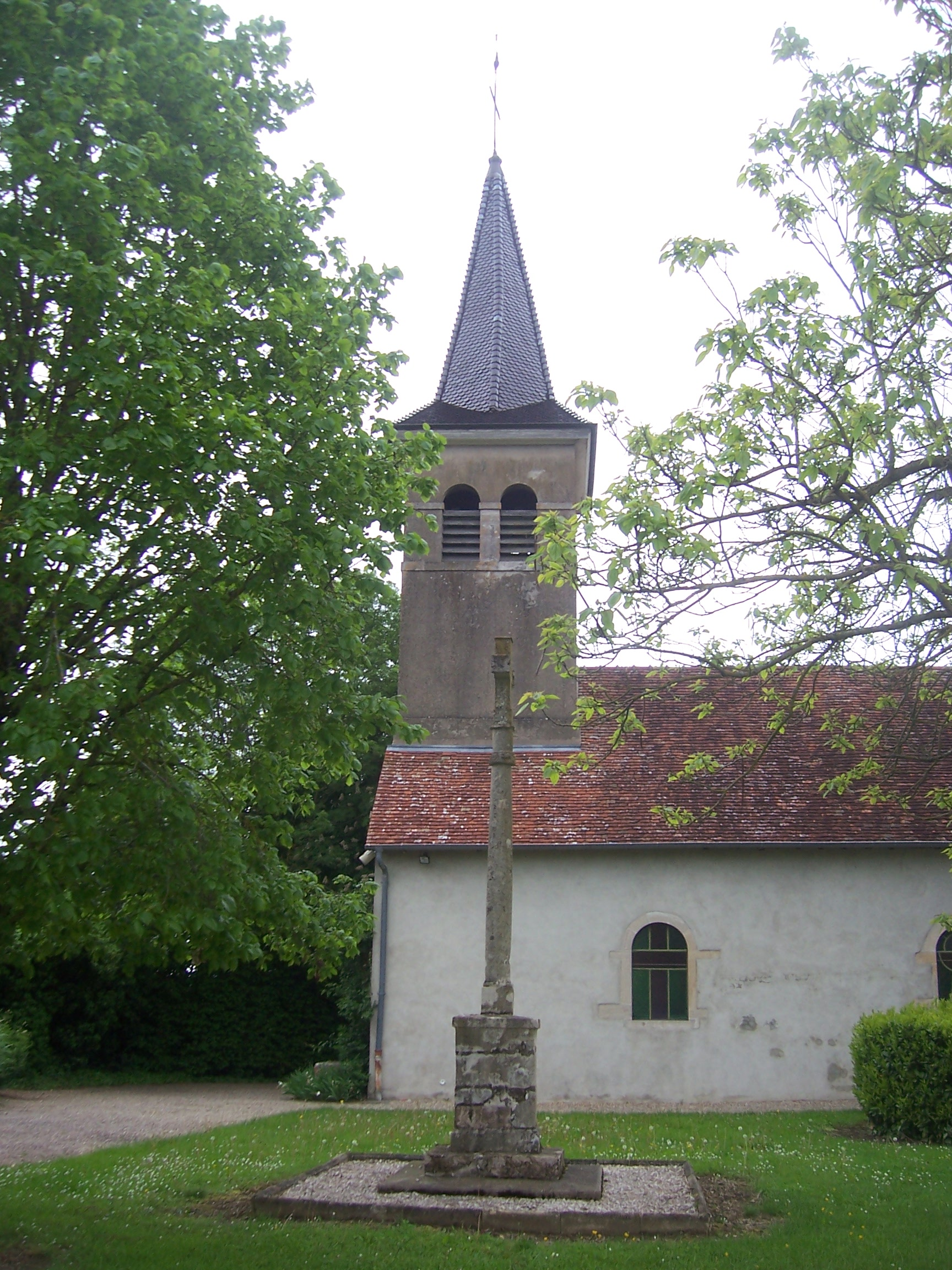
- The church in Juif
- Location of Juif
- Location within France Location within Bourgogne-Franche-Comté
- Coordinates: 46°40′58″N 5°09′38″E
- Country: France
- Region: Bourgogne-Franche-Comté
- Department: Saône-et-Loire
- Arrondissement: Louhans
- Canton: Louhans
- Area^{1}: 11.8 km^{2} (4.6 sq mi)
- Elevation: 200 m (660 ft)
- Highest elevation: 210 m (690 ft)
- Lowest elevation: 182 m (597 ft)
- Population (2023): 248
  - Density: 21.0/km^{2} (54.4/sq mi)
- Time zone: UTC+01:00 (CET)
  - Summer (DST): UTC+02:00 (CEST)
- INSEE/Postal code: 71246 /71440
- ^{1} French Land Register data, which excludes lakes, ponds, glaciers > 1 km^{2} (0.386 sq mi or 247 acres) and river estuaries.

Juif (French pronunciation: [ʒɥif]) is a commune in the Saône-et-Loire department in the region of Bourgogne-Franche-Comté in eastern France.

== See also ==
- Communes of the Saône-et-Loire department
