= La Chapelle-Naude =

- Commune
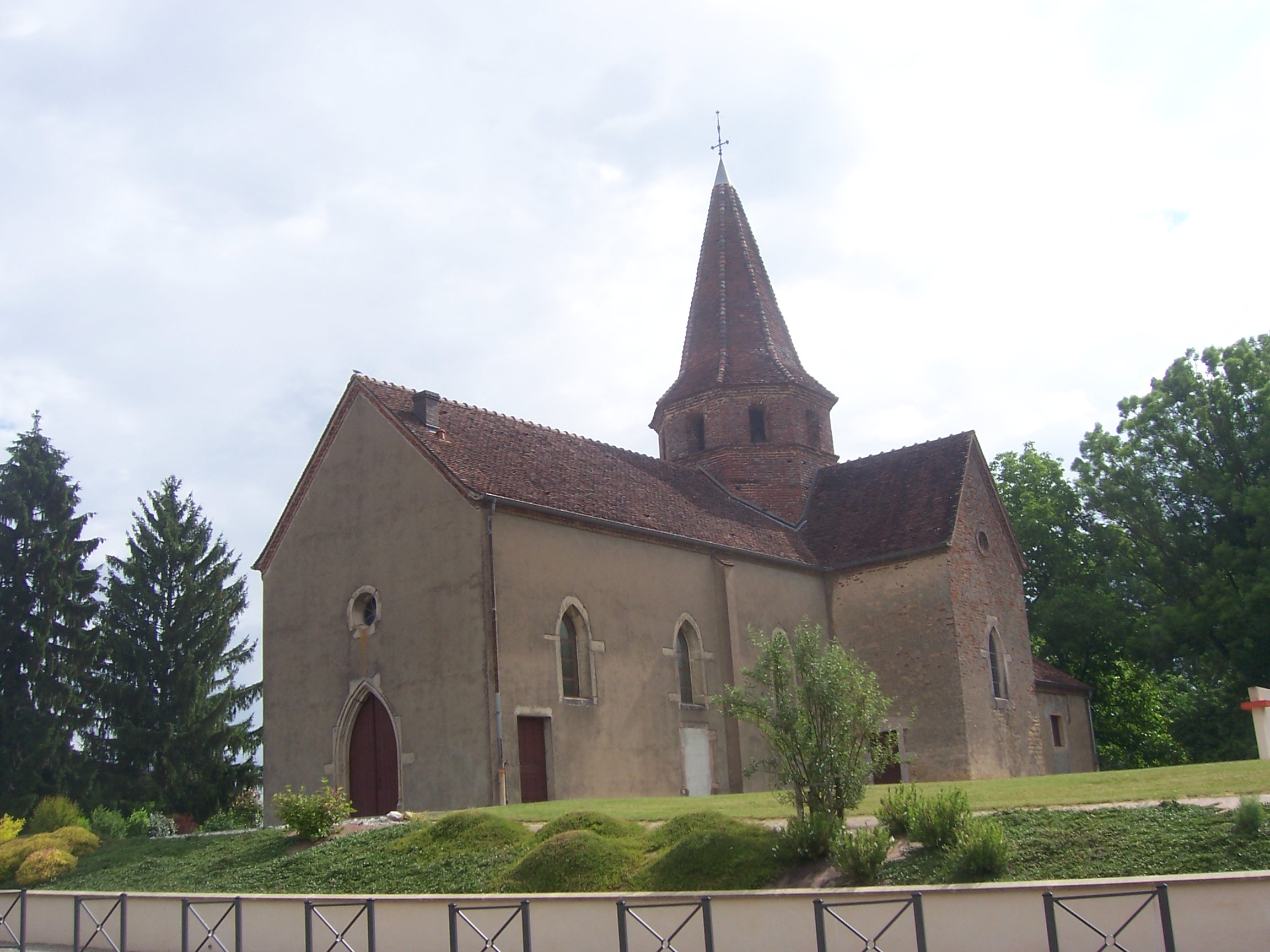
- The church in La Chapelle-Naude
- Location of La Chapelle-Naude
- Location within France Location within Bourgogne-Franche-Comté
- Coordinates: 46°35′42″N 5°11′33″E
- Country: France
- Region: Bourgogne-Franche-Comté
- Department: Saône-et-Loire
- Arrondissement: Louhans
- Canton: Louhans

Government
  - Mayor (2020–2026): Sébastien Guigue
- Area^{1}: 19.06 km^{2} (7.36 sq mi)
- Elevation: 200 m (660 ft)
- Highest elevation: 205 m (673 ft)
- Lowest elevation: 177 m (581 ft)
- Population (2023): 500
  - Density: 26/km^{2} (68/sq mi)
- Time zone: UTC+01:00 (CET)
  - Summer (DST): UTC+02:00 (CEST)
- INSEE/Postal code: 71092 /71500
- ^{1} French Land Register data, which excludes lakes, ponds, glaciers > 1 km^{2} (0.386 sq mi or 247 acres) and river estuaries.

La Chapelle-Naude (French pronunciation: [la ʃapɛl nod]) is a commune in the Saône-et-Loire department in the region of Bourgogne-Franche-Comté in eastern France.

== Geography ==
The Solnan forms the commune's northeastern border.

The Sâne Morte forms part of the commune's southeastern border, flows Northwest through the commune, then forms most of its northwestern border.

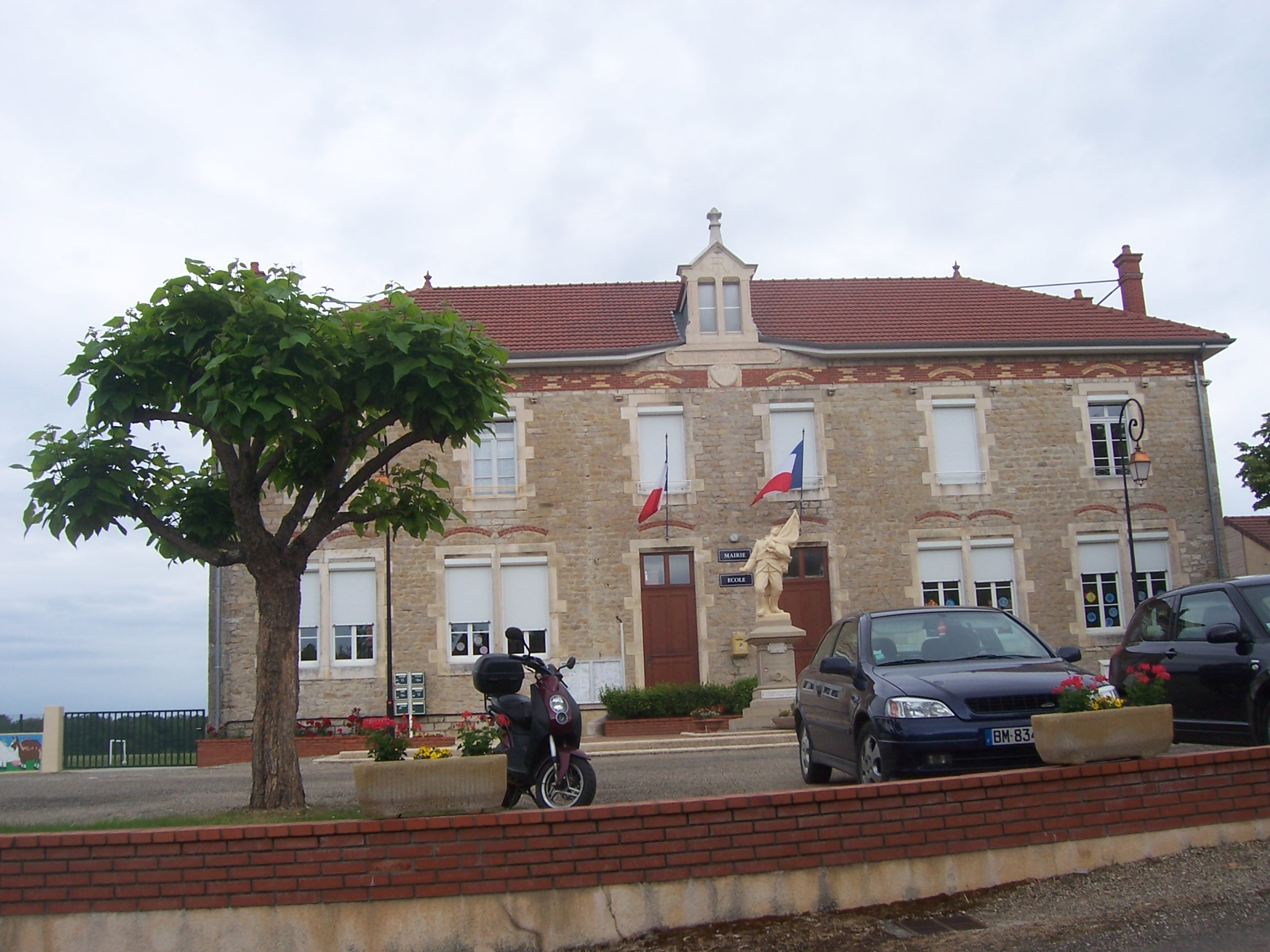
Town hall

== See also ==
- Communes of the Saône-et-Loire department
