= Châteaurenaud =

Commune in Saône-et-Loire, France, dissolved 1973

Coordinates: 46°38′N 5°14′E

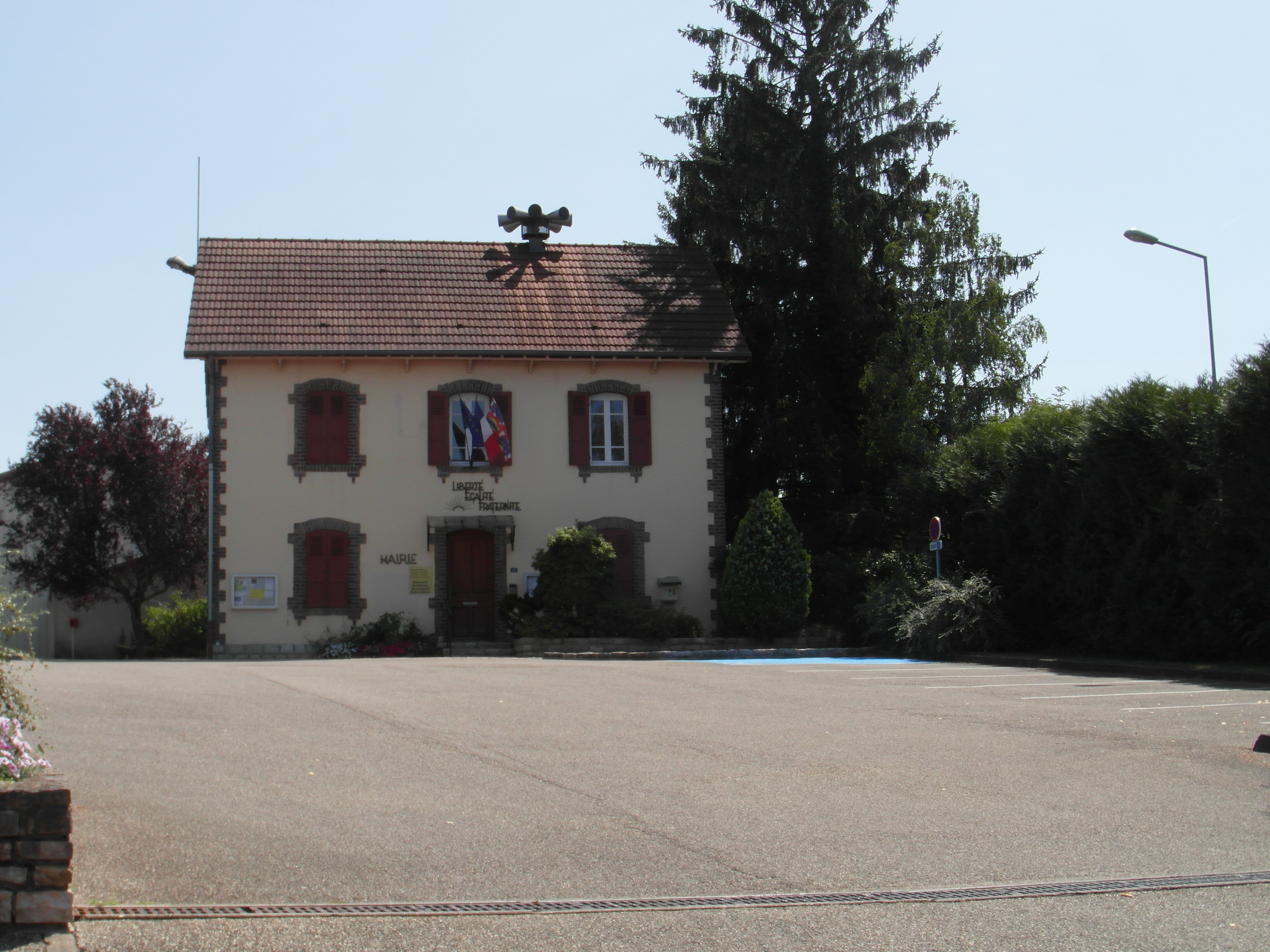
Former town hall of Châteaurenaud

Châteaurenaud is a former commune in the department of Saône-et-Loire in eastern France. It is a suburb of Louhans and was incorporated into that commune in July 1973. Louhans was officially renamed Louhans-Châteaurenaud in 2026.
