= Sagy, Saône-et-Loire =

Sagy
- Commune
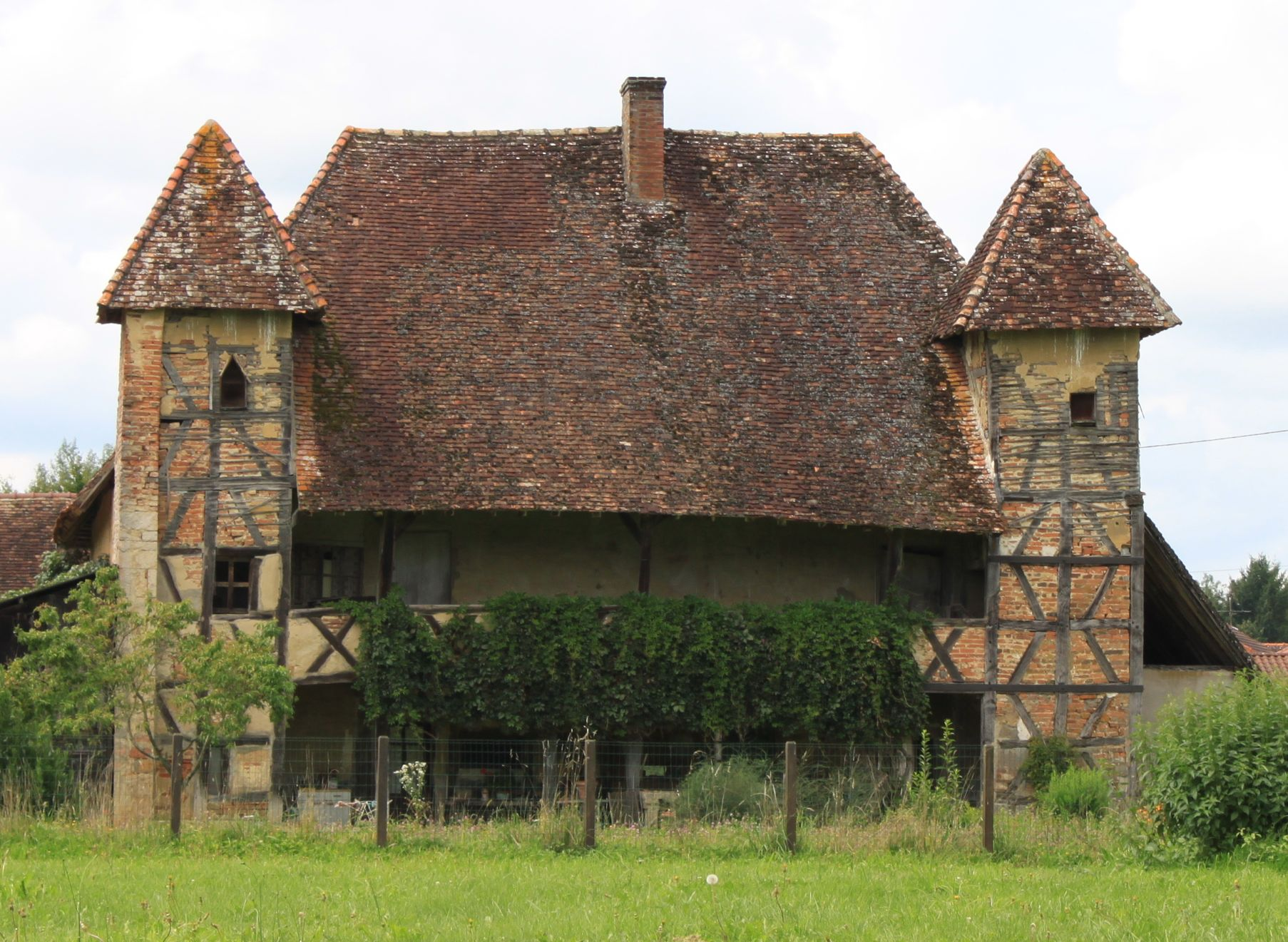
- Maison du Bailli
- Location of Sagy
- Location within France Location within Bourgogne-Franche-Comté
- Coordinates: 46°36′07″N 5°18′34″E
- Country: France
- Region: Bourgogne-Franche-Comté
- Department: Saône-et-Loire
- Arrondissement: Louhans
- Canton: Louhans
- Area^{1}: 34.21 km^{2} (13.21 sq mi)
- Elevation: 211 m (692 ft)
- Highest elevation: 218 m (715 ft)
- Lowest elevation: 182 m (597 ft)
- Population (2023): 1,249
  - Density: 36.51/km^{2} (94.56/sq mi)
- Time zone: UTC+01:00 (CET)
  - Summer (DST): UTC+02:00 (CEST)
- INSEE/Postal code: 71379 /71580
- ^{1} French Land Register data, which excludes lakes, ponds, glaciers > 1 km^{2} (0.386 sq mi or 247 acres) and river estuaries.

Sagy (French pronunciation: [saʒi]) is a commune in the Saône-et-Loire department in the region of Bourgogne-Franche-Comté in eastern France.

== Geography ==
The Vallière flows westward through the middle of the commune.

== See also ==
- Communes of the Saône-et-Loire department
