= Sornay, Saône-et-Loire =

Sornay
- Commune
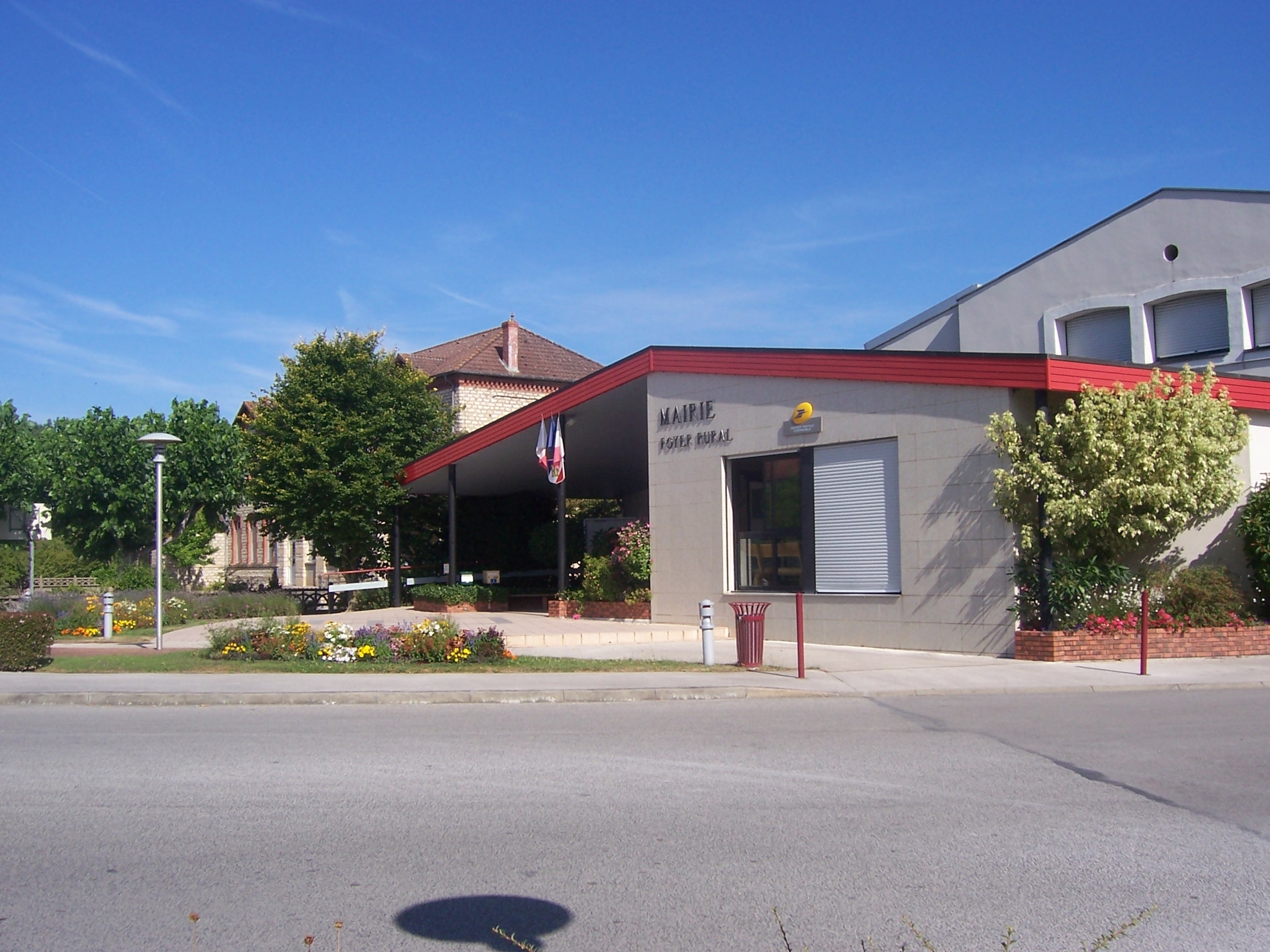
- Town hall

- Coat of arms
- Location of Sornay
- Location within France Location within Bourgogne-Franche-Comté
- Coordinates: 46°37′39″N 5°10′47″E
- Country: France
- Region: Bourgogne-Franche-Comté
- Department: Saône-et-Loire
- Arrondissement: Louhans
- Canton: Louhans
- Intercommunality: Bresse Louhannaise

Government
  - Mayor (2020–2026): Christian Clerc
- Area^{1}: 18.12 km^{2} (7.00 sq mi)
- Elevation: 179 m (587 ft)
- Highest elevation: 200 m (660 ft)
- Lowest elevation: 174 m (571 ft)
- Population (2023): 1,960
  - Density: 108/km^{2} (280/sq mi)
- Time zone: UTC+01:00 (CET)
  - Summer (DST): UTC+02:00 (CEST)
- INSEE/Postal code: 71528 /71500
- ^{1} French Land Register data, which excludes lakes, ponds, glaciers > 1 km^{2} (0.386 sq mi or 247 acres) and river estuaries.

Sornay (French pronunciation: [sɔʁnɛ]) is a commune in the Saône-et-Loire department in the region of Bourgogne-Franche-Comté in eastern France.

== Geography ==
The river Seille forms the commune's northern border. The Sâne Morte forms part of the commune's southern border.

== See also ==
- Communes of the Saône-et-Loire department
