= Branges =

- Commune
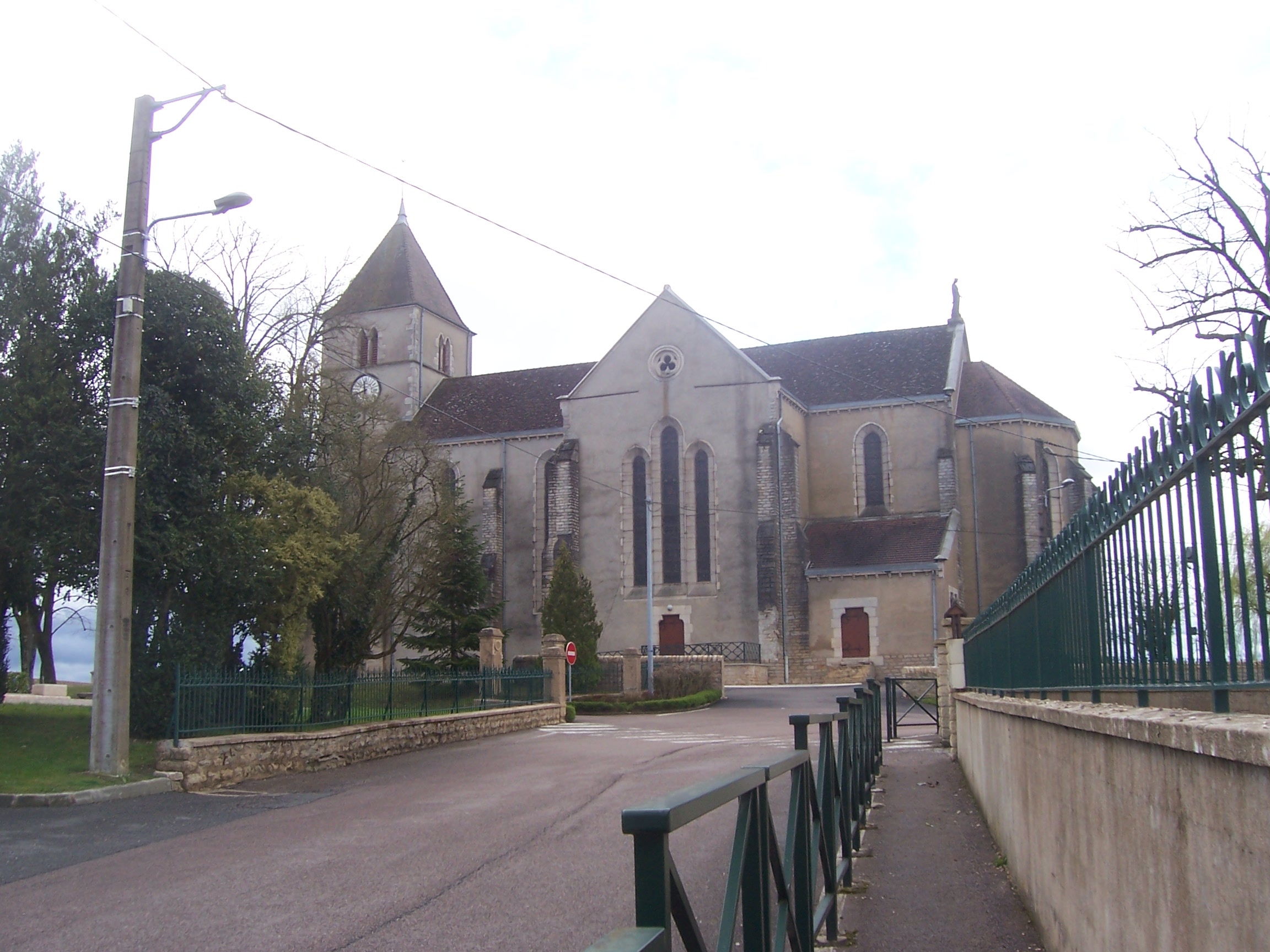
- The church in Branges

- Coat of arms
- Location of Branges
- Location within France Location within Bourgogne-Franche-Comté
- Coordinates: 46°38′45″N 5°10′31″E
- Country: France
- Region: Bourgogne-Franche-Comté
- Department: Saône-et-Loire
- Arrondissement: Louhans
- Canton: Louhans

Government
  - Mayor (2020–2026): Anthony Vadot
- Area^{1}: 24.59 km^{2} (9.49 sq mi)
- Elevation: 187 m (614 ft)
- Highest elevation: 209 m (686 ft)
- Lowest elevation: 173 m (568 ft)
- Population (2023): 2,386
  - Density: 97.03/km^{2} (251.3/sq mi)
- Time zone: UTC+01:00 (CET)
  - Summer (DST): UTC+02:00 (CEST)
- INSEE/Postal code: 71056 /71500
- ^{1} French Land Register data, which excludes lakes, ponds, glaciers > 1 km^{2} (0.386 sq mi or 247 acres) and river estuaries.

Branges (French pronunciation: [bʁɑ̃ʒ]) is a commune in the Saône-et-Loire department in the region of Bourgogne-Franche-Comté in eastern France.

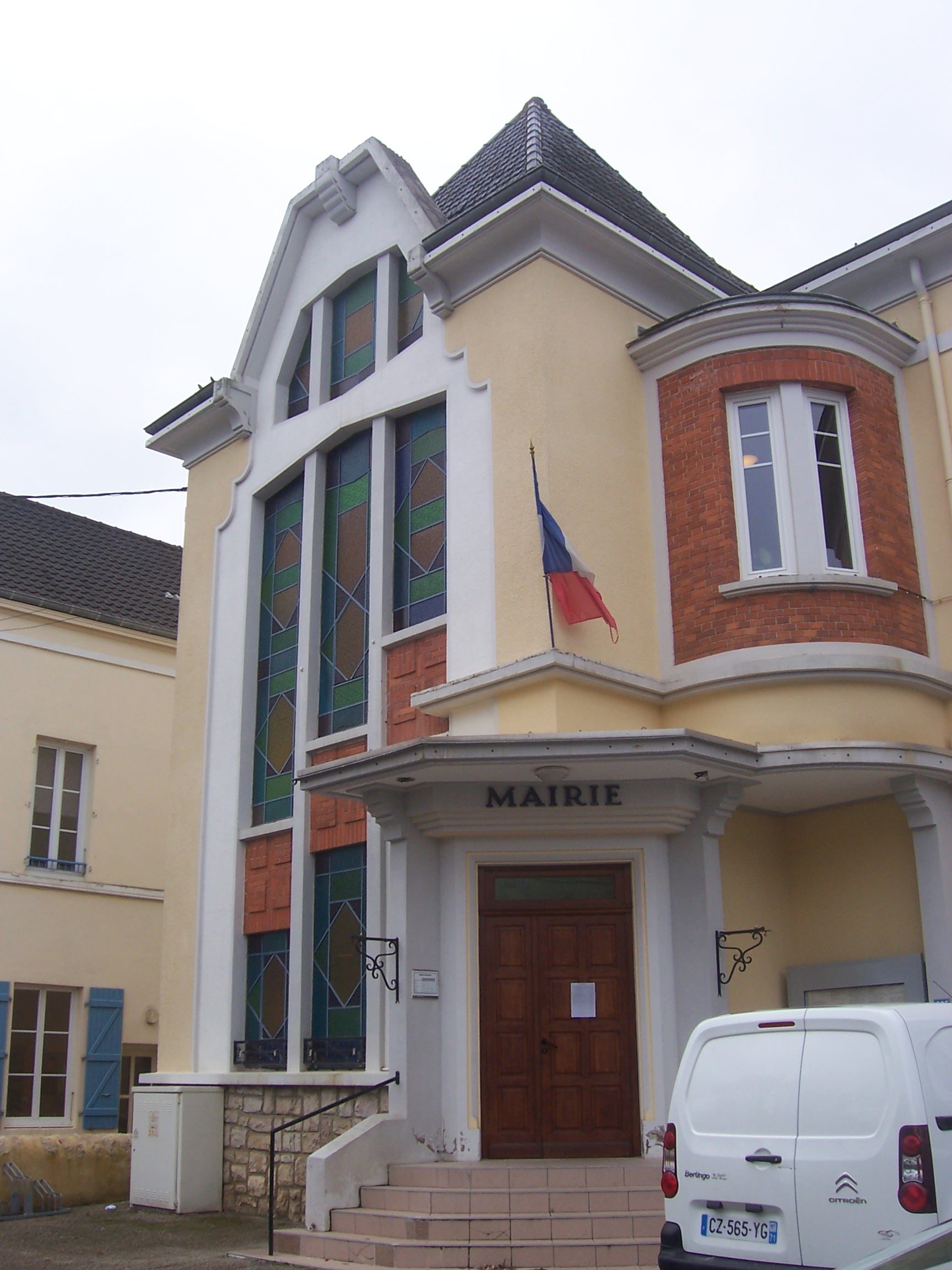
Town hall

== Population ==
Historical population
Year	Pop.	±% p.a.
1968	2,300	—
1975	2,338	+0.23%
1982	2,312	−0.16%
1990	2,155	−0.88%
1999	2,087	−0.36%
2007	2,319	+1.33%
2012	2,398	+0.67%
2017	2,357	−0.34%
2023	2,386	+0.20%
Source: INSEE

== Toponymy ==
Historic names: Brilanga (926), Brangis (955), Branges (1793).

== Climate ==
According to the Köppen climate classification, Branges has a warm temperate climate with hot summers (Cfa). Météo-France classifies it as semi-continental, typical of the Saône valley in Burgundy, characterized by good sunshine (around 1,900 hours per year), hot summers (average 18.5 °C), dry spring and summer air, and generally weak winds.

== See also ==
- Communes of the Saône-et-Loire department
