= Canton of Louhans =

Coordinates: 46.63°N 5.22°E

The canton of Louhans is an administrative division of the Saône-et-Loire department, eastern France. Its borders were modified at the French canton reorganisation which came into effect in March 2015. Its seat is in Louhans-Châteaurenaud.

It consists of the following communes:

1. Branges
2. Bruailles
3. La Chapelle-Naude
4. Le Fay
5. Juif
6. Louhans-Châteaurenaud
7. Montagny-près-Louhans
8. Montcony
9. Montret
10. Ratte
11. Sagy
12. Saint-André-en-Bresse
13. Saint-Étienne-en-Bresse
14. Saint-Martin-du-Mont
15. Saint-Usuge
16. Saint-Vincent-en-Bresse
17. Simard
18. Sornay
19. Vérissey
20. Vincelles
