= Allériot =

- Commune
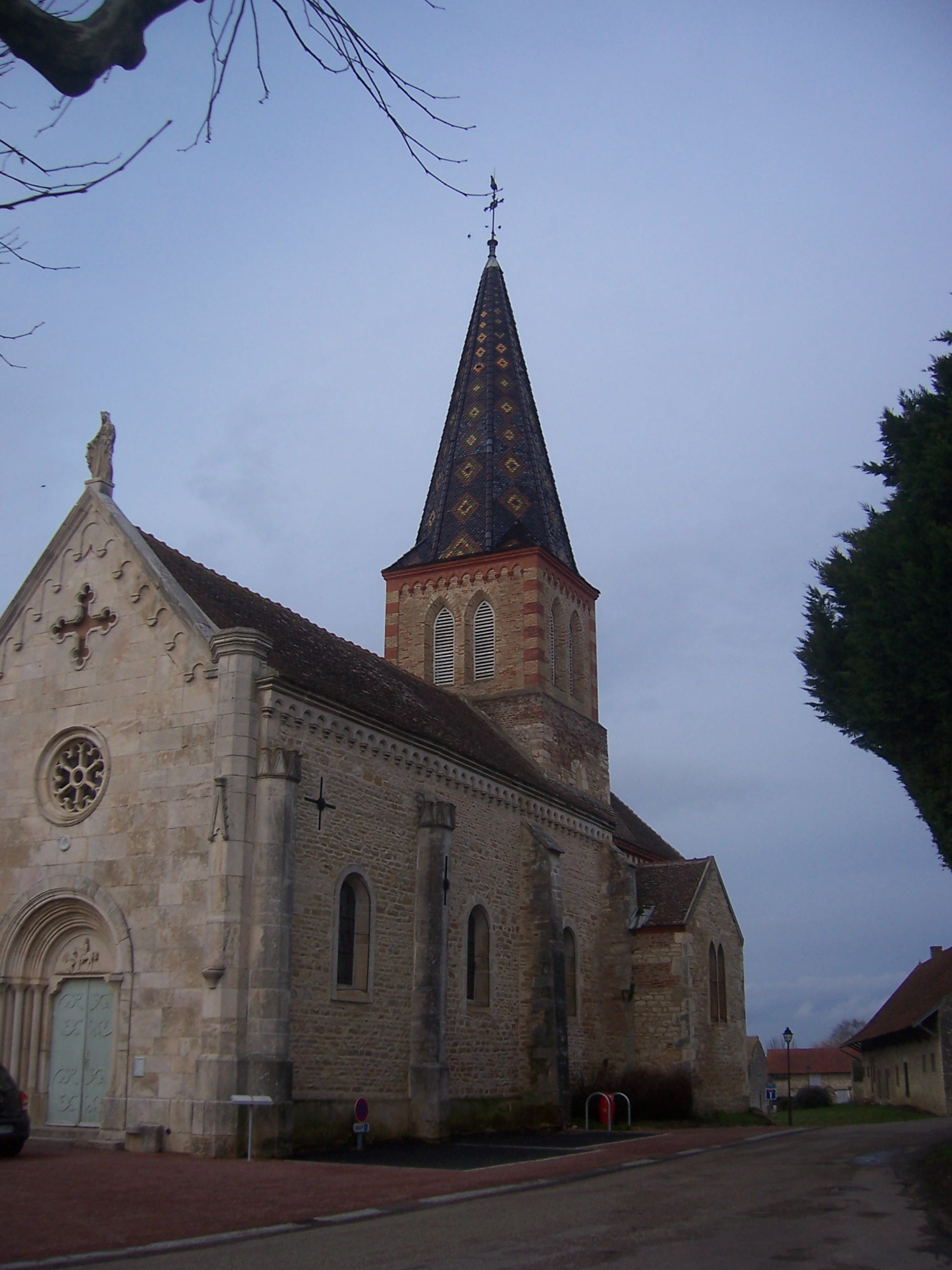
- Location of Allériot
- Location within France Location within Bourgogne-Franche-Comté
- Coordinates: 46°48′55″N 4°56′41″E
- Country: France
- Region: Bourgogne-Franche-Comté
- Department: Saône-et-Loire
- Arrondissement: Chalon-sur-Saône
- Canton: Ouroux-sur-Saône
- Intercommunality: Saône Doubs Bresse

Government
  - Mayor (2020–2026): Brigitte Béal
- Area^{1}: 13.46 km^{2} (5.20 sq mi)
- Elevation: 181 m (594 ft)
- Highest elevation: 214 m (702 ft)
- Lowest elevation: 173 m (568 ft)
- Population (2023): 1,165
  - Density: 86.55/km^{2} (224.2/sq mi)
- Time zone: UTC+01:00 (CET)
  - Summer (DST): UTC+02:00 (CEST)
- INSEE/Postal code: 71004 /71380
- ^{1} French Land Register data, which excludes lakes, ponds, glaciers > 1 km^{2} (0.386 sq mi or 247 acres) and river estuaries.

Allériot (French pronunciation: [aleʁjo]) is a commune in the Saône-et-Loire department in the Bourgogne-Franche-Comté region in eastern France.

== Geography ==
The commune lies east of the Saône near Chalon-sur-Saône.

== Population ==
Historical population
Year	Pop.	±% p.a.
1968	384	—
1975	439	+1.93%
1982	615	+4.93%
1990	737	+2.29%
1999	814	+1.11%
2007	928	+1.65%
2012	1,025	+2.01%
2017	1,145	+2.24%
2023	1,165	+0.29%
Source: INSEE

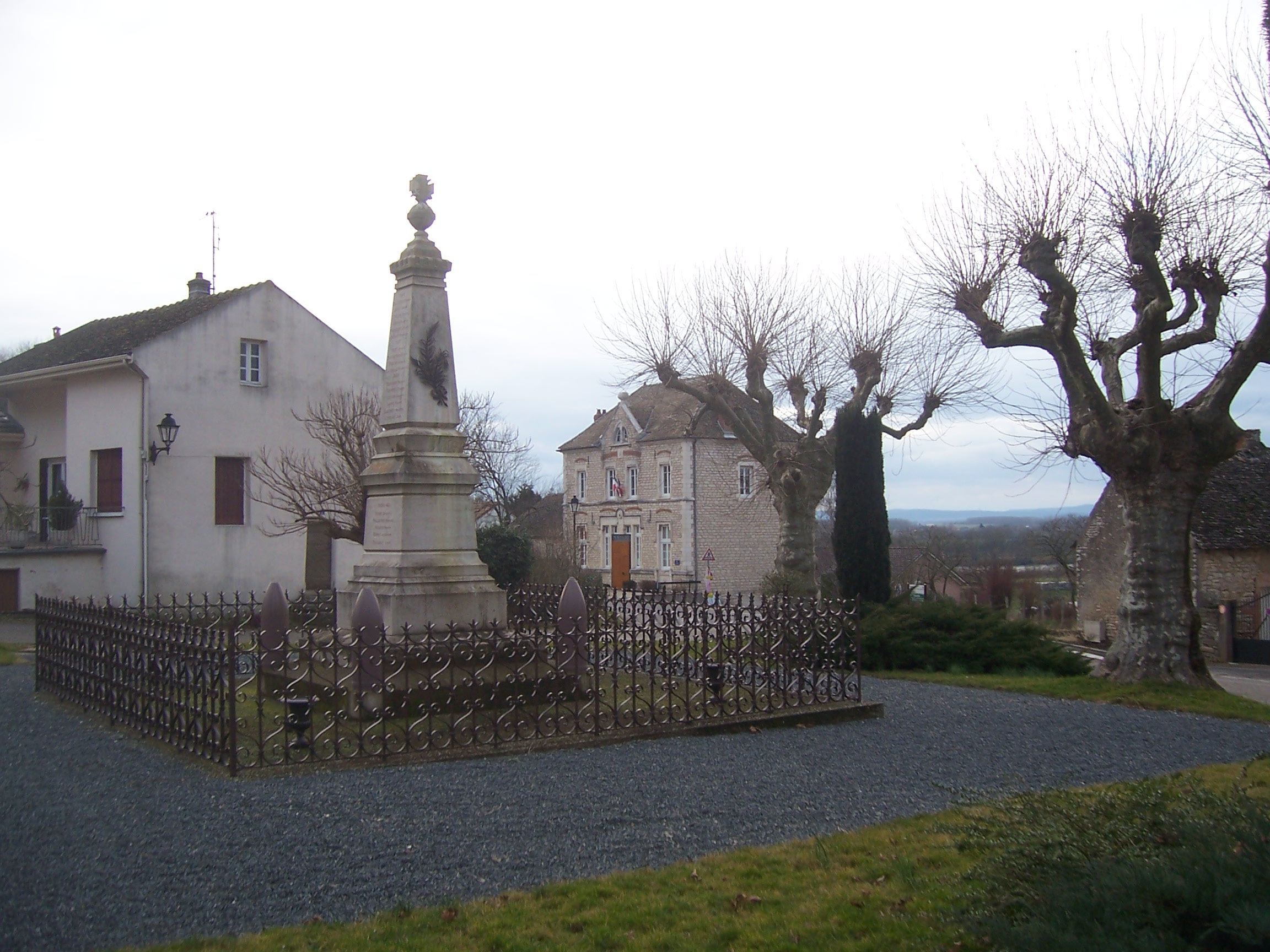
Town hall and war memorial

== See also ==
- Communes of the Saône-et-Loire department
