= Canton of Ouroux-sur-Saône =

Coordinates: 46.72°N 4.95°E

The canton of Ouroux-sur-Saône is an administrative division of the Saône-et-Loire department, eastern France. It was created at the French canton reorganisation which came into effect in March 2015. Its seat is in Ouroux-sur-Saône.

It consists of the following communes:

1. L'Abergement-Sainte-Colombe
2. Allériot
3. Baudrières
4. Châtenoy-en-Bresse
5. Guerfand
6. Lans
7. Lessard-en-Bresse
8. Montcoy
9. Oslon
10. Ouroux-sur-Saône
11. Saint-Christophe-en-Bresse
12. Saint-Germain-du-Plain
13. Saint-Martin-en-Bresse
14. Tronchy
15. Villegaudin
