= L'Abergement-Sainte-Colombe =

- Commune
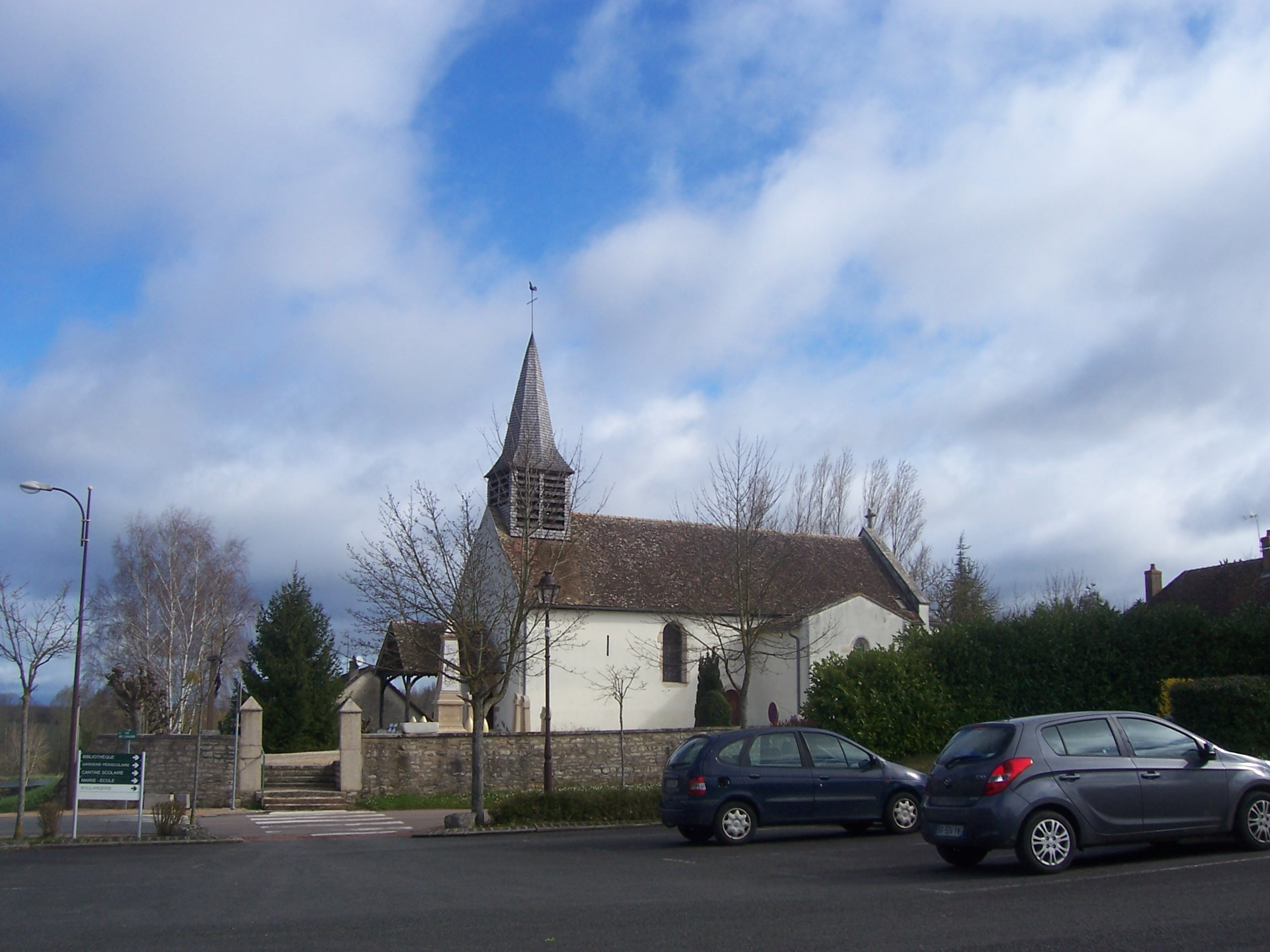
- Location of L'Abergement-Sainte-Colombe
- Location within France Location within Bourgogne-Franche-Comté
- Coordinates: 46°45′12″N 5°00′27″E
- Country: France
- Region: Bourgogne-Franche-Comté
- Department: Saône-et-Loire
- Arrondissement: Louhans
- Canton: Ouroux-sur-Saône
- Intercommunality: Terres de Bresse

Government
  - Mayor (2020–2026): Stéphane Vivier
- Area^{1}: 19.53 km^{2} (7.54 sq mi)
- Elevation: 200 m (660 ft)
- Highest elevation: 217 m (712 ft)
- Lowest elevation: 181 m (594 ft)
- Population (2023): 1,233
  - Density: 63.13/km^{2} (163.5/sq mi)
- Time zone: UTC+01:00 (CET)
  - Summer (DST): UTC+02:00 (CEST)
- INSEE/Postal code: 71002 /71370
- ^{1} French Land Register data, which excludes lakes, ponds, glaciers > 1 km^{2} (0.386 sq mi or 247 acres) and river estuaries.

L'Abergement-Sainte-Colombe (French pronunciation: [labɛʁʒ(ə)mɑ̃ sɛ̃t kɔlɔ̃b]) is a commune in the Saône-et-Loire department in Bourgogne-Franche-Comté in eastern France.

== Geography ==
The commune lies on the plain of Bresse east of Chalon-sur-Saône.

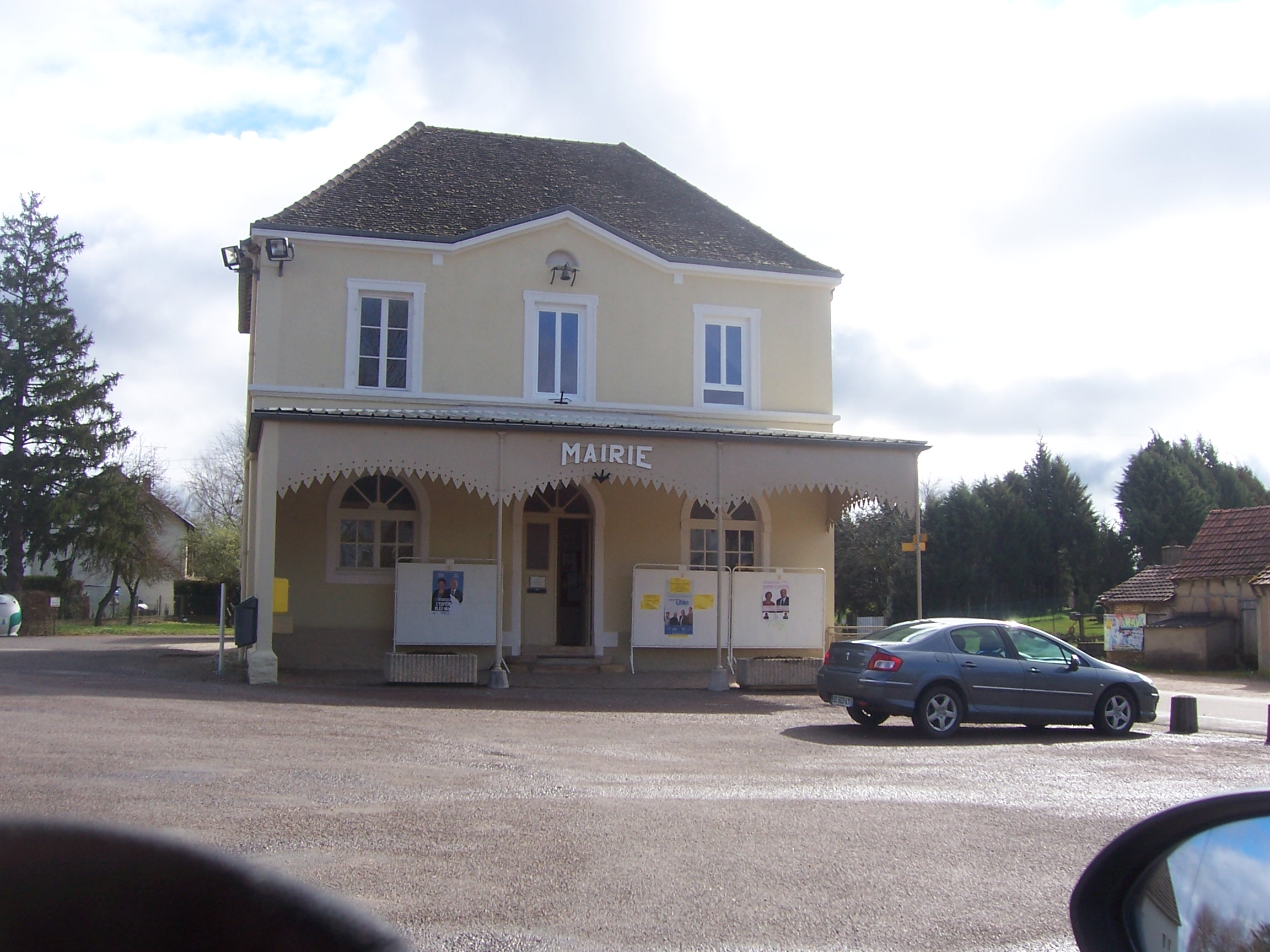
Town hall

== Population ==
Historical population
Year	Pop.	±% p.a.
1968	558	—
1975	622	+1.56%
1982	702	+1.74%
1990	876	+2.81%
1999	934	+0.71%
2007	1,057	+1.56%
2012	1,156	+1.81%
2017	1,224	+1.15%
2023	1,233	+0.12%
Source: INSEE

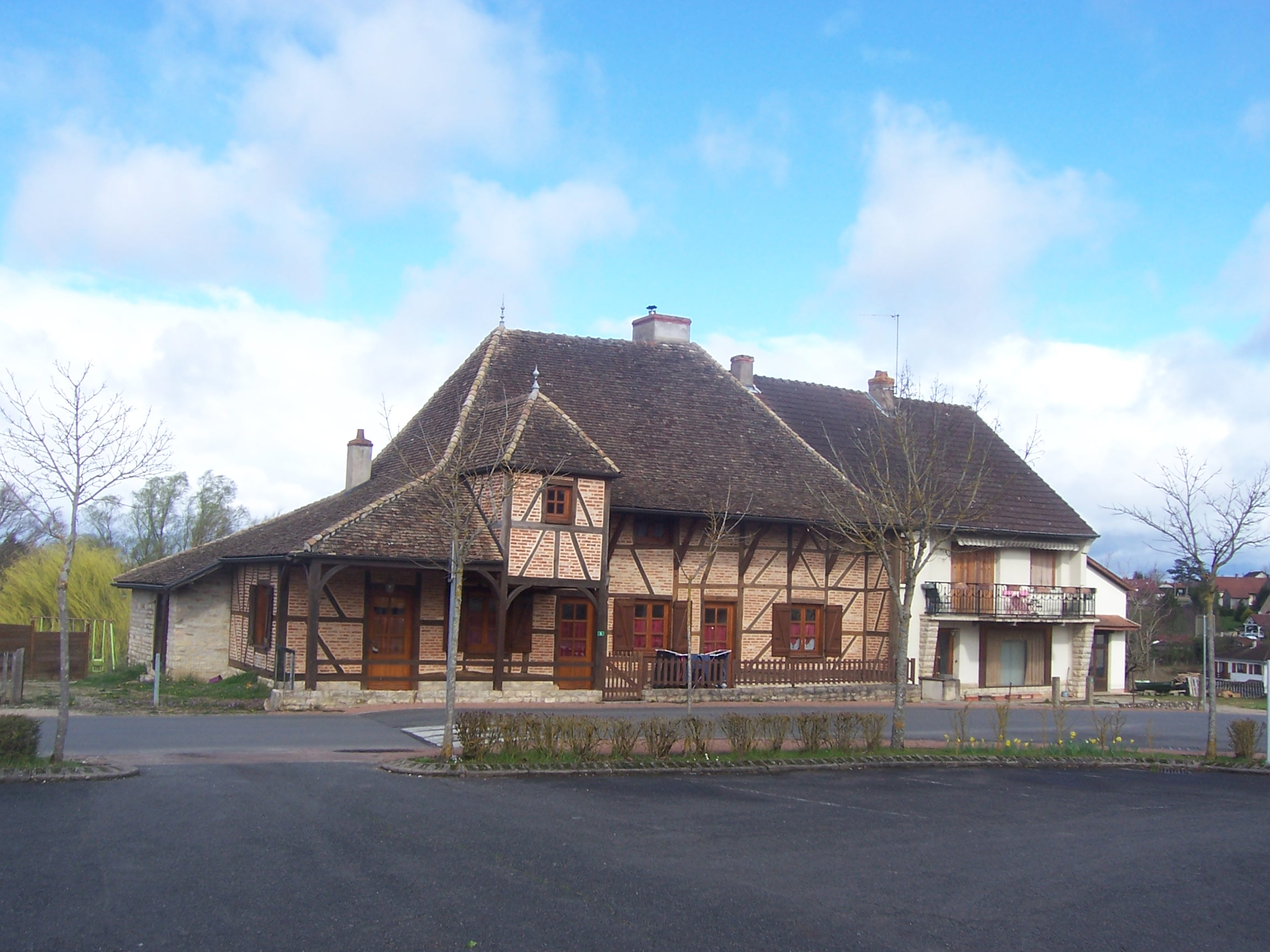
House

== See also ==
- Communes of the Saône-et-Loire department
