= Montcoy =

- Commune
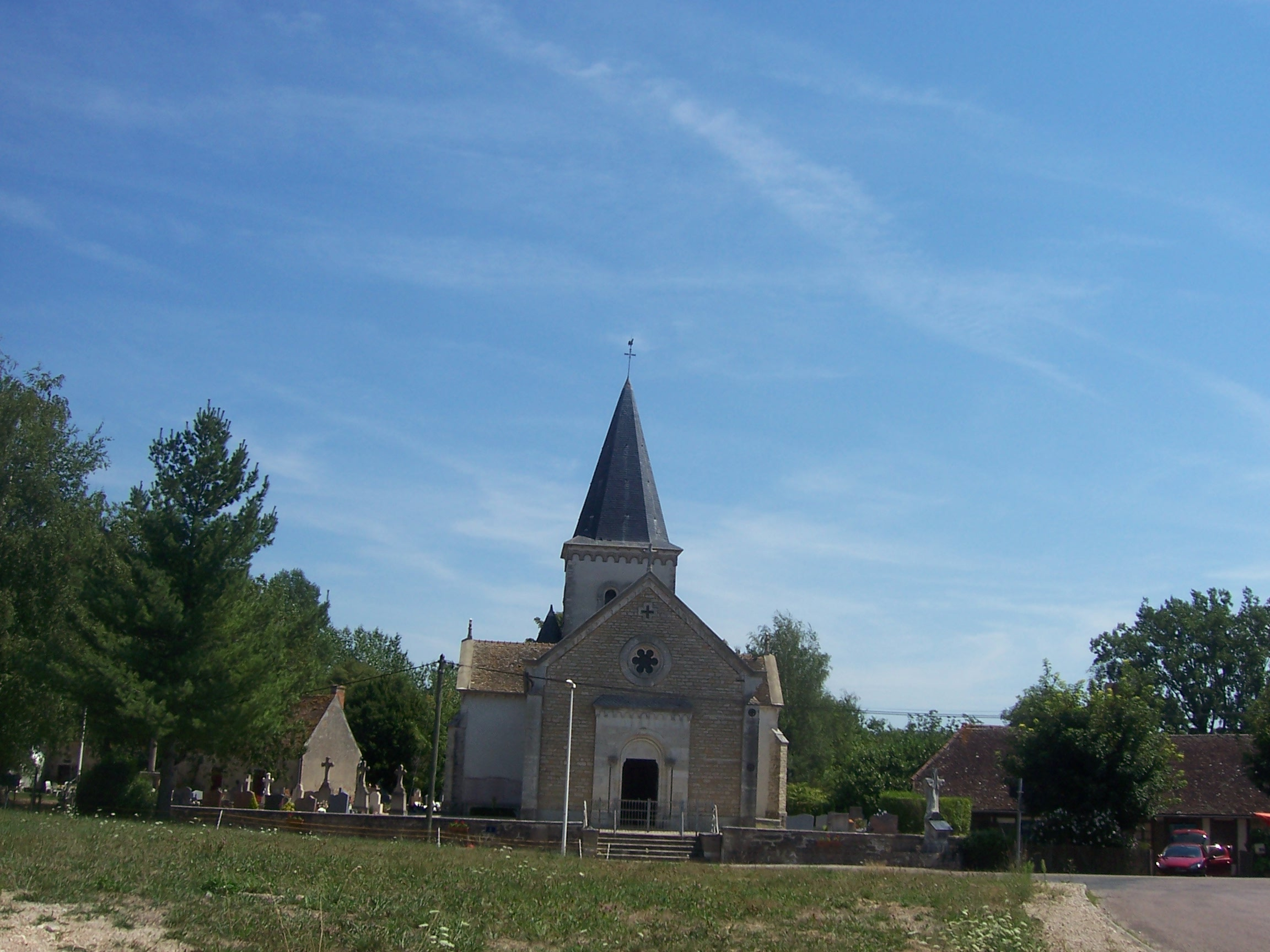
- The church in Montcoy
- Location of Montcoy
- Location within France Location within Bourgogne-Franche-Comté
- Coordinates: 46°48′06″N 4°59′55″E
- Country: France
- Region: Bourgogne-Franche-Comté
- Department: Saône-et-Loire
- Arrondissement: Chalon-sur-Saône
- Canton: Ouroux-sur-Saône
- Area^{1}: 9.06 km^{2} (3.50 sq mi)
- Elevation: 210 m (690 ft)
- Highest elevation: 214 m (702 ft)
- Lowest elevation: 177 m (581 ft)
- Population (2023): 234
  - Density: 25.8/km^{2} (66.9/sq mi)
- Time zone: UTC+01:00 (CET)
  - Summer (DST): UTC+02:00 (CEST)
- INSEE/Postal code: 71312 /71620
- ^{1} French Land Register data, which excludes lakes, ponds, glaciers > 1 km^{2} (0.386 sq mi or 247 acres) and river estuaries.

Montcoy (French pronunciation: [mɔ̃kwa]) is a commune in the Saône-et-Loire department in the region of Bourgogne-Franche-Comté in eastern France.

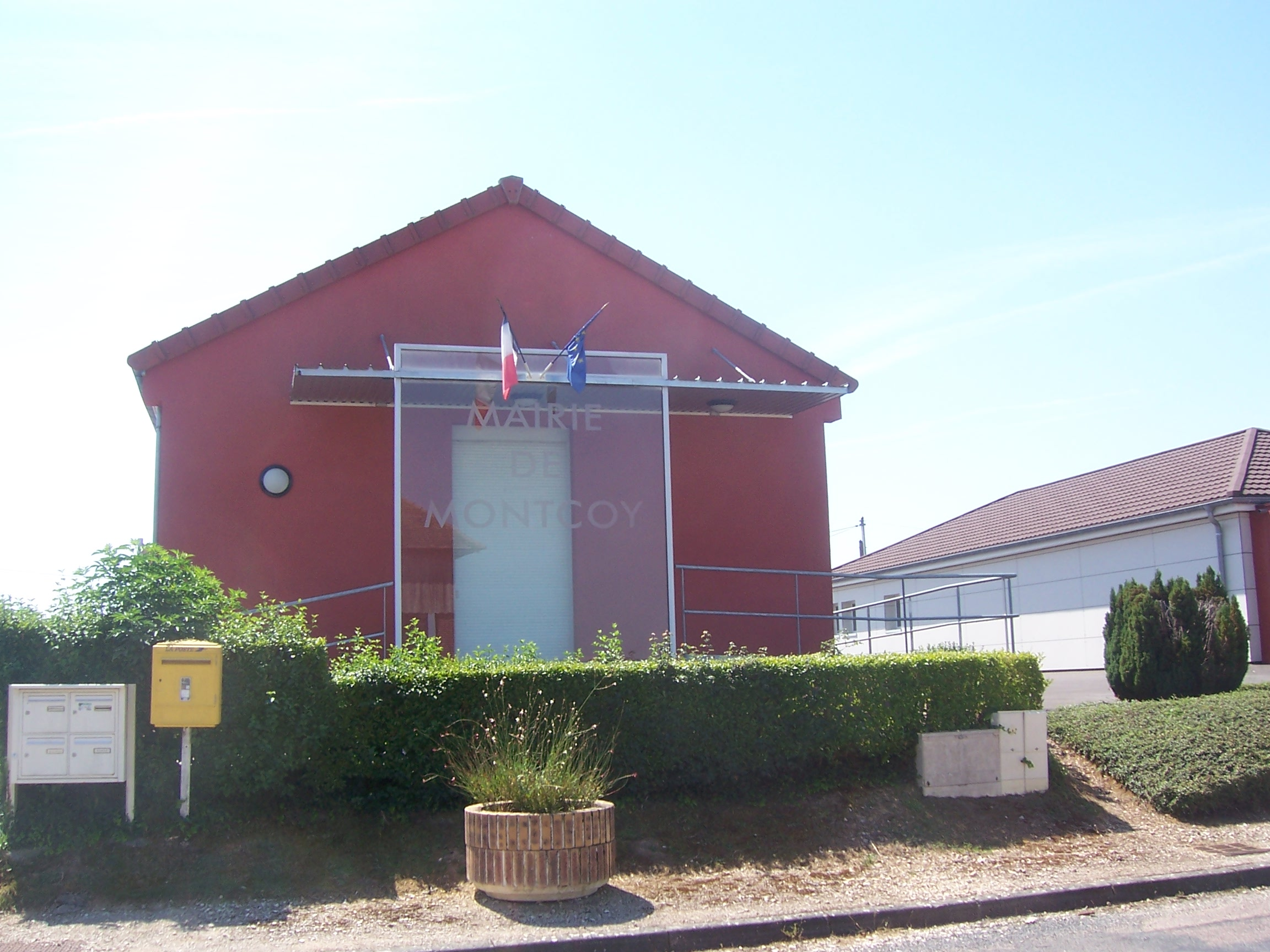
Town hall

== See also ==
- Communes of the Saône-et-Loire department
