= Oslon =

- Commune
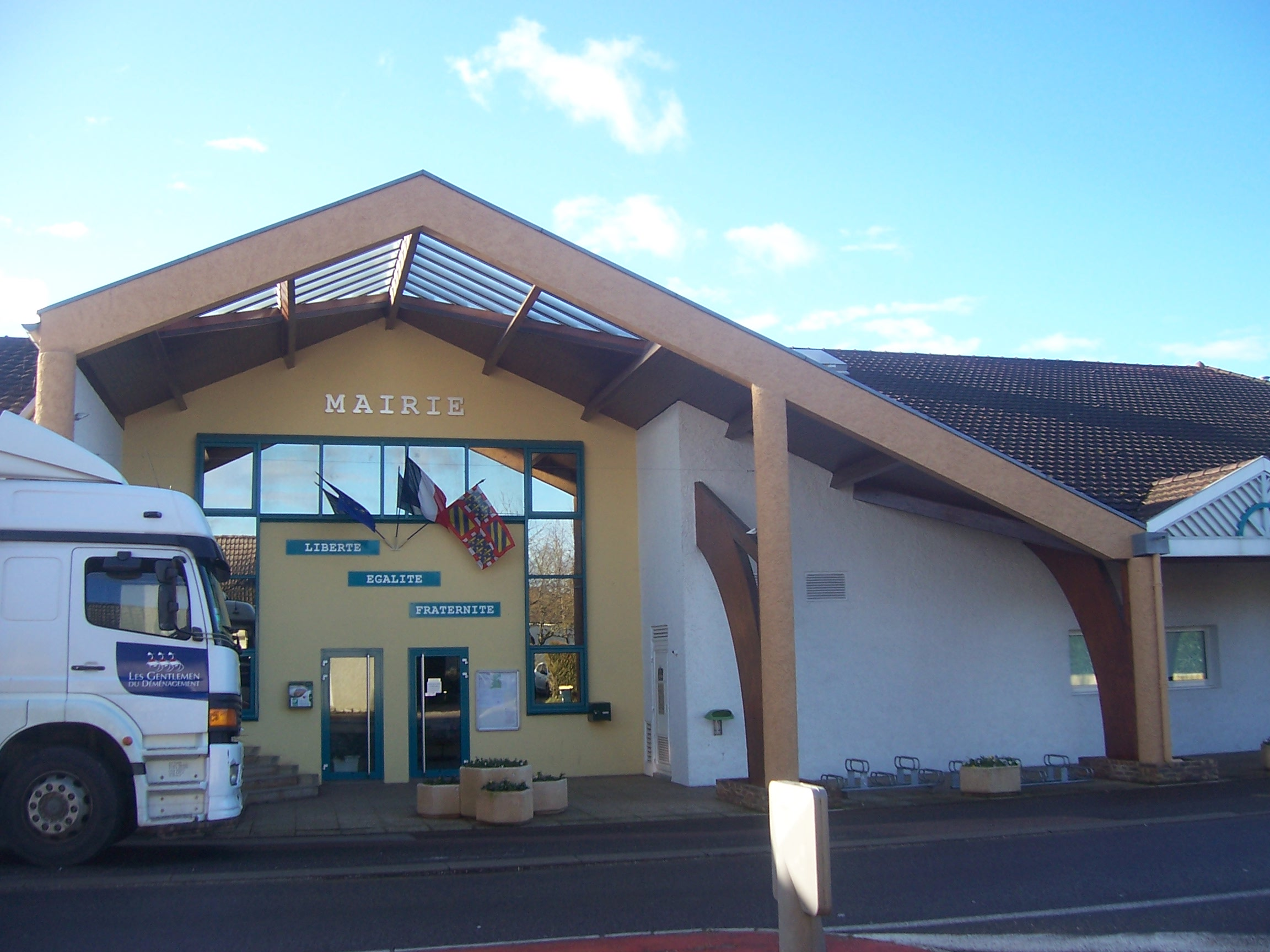
- Town hall
- Location of Oslon
- Location within France Location within Bourgogne-Franche-Comté
- Coordinates: 46°47′04″N 4°55′23″E
- Country: France
- Region: Bourgogne-Franche-Comté
- Department: Saône-et-Loire
- Arrondissement: Chalon-sur-Saône
- Canton: Ouroux-sur-Saône
- Intercommunality: CA Le Grand Chalon
- Area^{1}: 4.76 km^{2} (1.84 sq mi)
- Elevation: 178 m (584 ft)
- Highest elevation: 214 m (702 ft)
- Lowest elevation: 179 m (587 ft)
- Population (2023): 1,220
  - Density: 256/km^{2} (664/sq mi)
- Time zone: UTC+01:00 (CET)
  - Summer (DST): UTC+02:00 (CEST)
- INSEE/Postal code: 71333 /71380
- ^{1} French Land Register data, which excludes lakes, ponds, glaciers > 1 km^{2} (0.386 sq mi or 247 acres) and river estuaries.

Oslon is a commune in the Saône-et-Loire department in the region of Bourgogne-Franche-Comté in eastern France.

== History ==
The village was founded circa 1850 when the French postal services installed a forepost alongside the railroad. Previously the region had been populated by diverse immigration which started under the Roman Empire, which had a great commercial route (the Appian Way) and stopover a few miles away in the city of Autun.

Oslon was the first city where the fighters of the Resistance went when they entered the free zone after the German invasion of France during World War II. The Germans stopped just outside Chalon-sur-Saône. Many Frenchmen died trying to swim across to Oslon and the free zone.

== Specialties of the area ==
The Burgundy "Bresse" area, which starts at Oslon and finishes north and east of Lyon, is famous as the prime area for escargot. It also produces good wines.

== People ==
The most famous people from the village are Nicephore Niepce, who invented modern photography, and the tycoon family which created Rhone-Poulenc, the French Fortune 200 conglomerate.

== See also ==
- Communes of the Saône-et-Loire department
