= Villegaudin =

- Commune
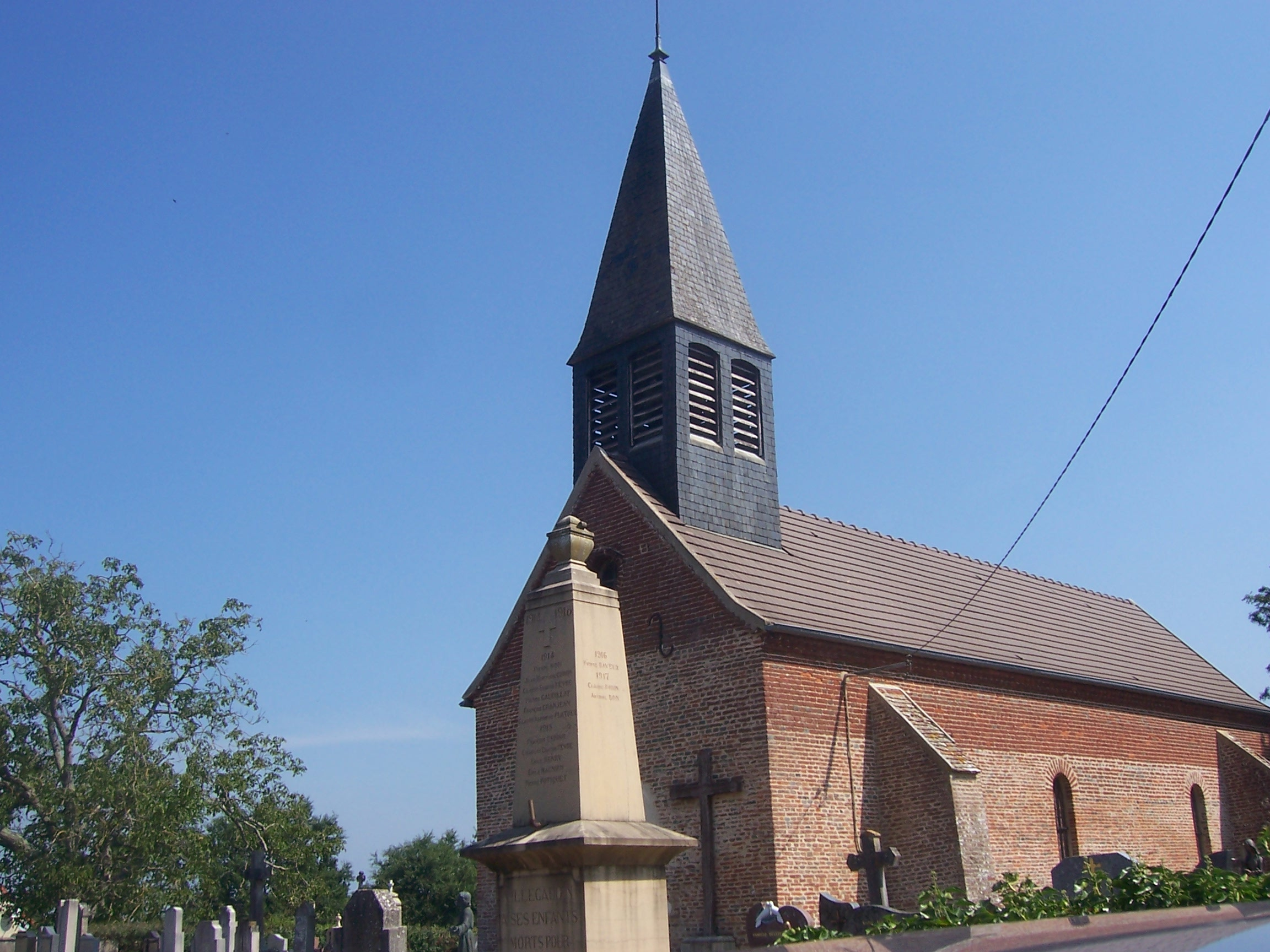
- The church in Villegaudin
- Location of Villegaudin
- Location within France Location within Bourgogne-Franche-Comté
- Coordinates: 46°47′50″N 5°05′56″E
- Country: France
- Region: Bourgogne-Franche-Comté
- Department: Saône-et-Loire
- Arrondissement: Chalon-sur-Saône
- Canton: Ouroux-sur-Saône
- Area^{1}: 8.96 km^{2} (3.46 sq mi)
- Elevation: 200 m (660 ft)
- Highest elevation: 213 m (699 ft)
- Lowest elevation: 185 m (607 ft)
- Population (2023): 215
  - Density: 24.0/km^{2} (62.1/sq mi)
- Time zone: UTC+01:00 (CET)
  - Summer (DST): UTC+02:00 (CEST)
- INSEE/Postal code: 71577 /71620
- ^{1} French Land Register data, which excludes lakes, ponds, glaciers > 1 km^{2} (0.386 sq mi or 247 acres) and river estuaries.

Villegaudin (French pronunciation: [vilɡodɛ̃]) is a commune in the Saône-et-Loire department in the region of Bourgogne-Franche-Comté in eastern France.

== See also ==
- Communes of the Saône-et-Loire department
