= Guerfand =

- Commune
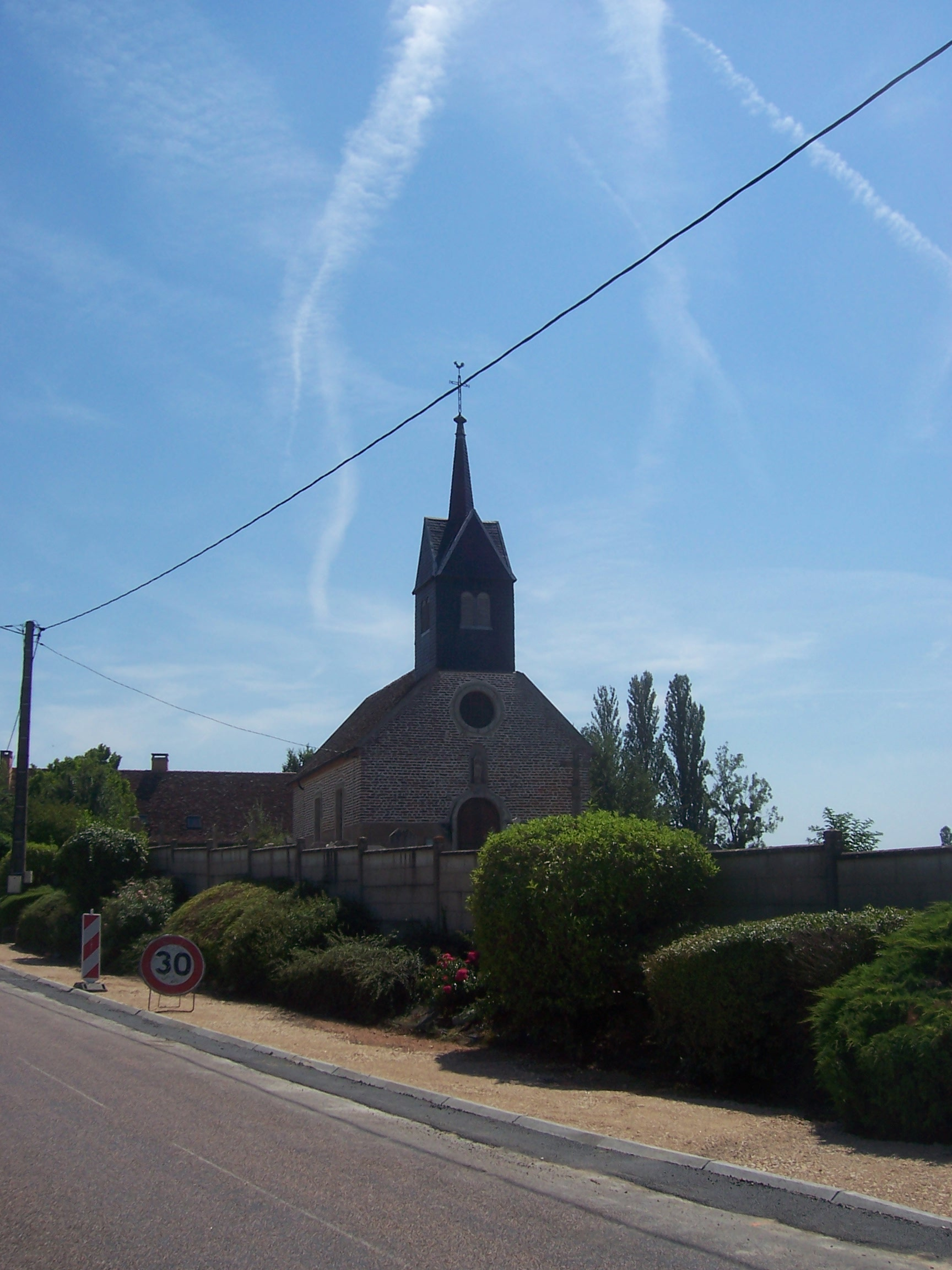
- The church in Guerfand

- Coat of arms
- Location of Guerfand
- Location within France Location within Bourgogne-Franche-Comté
- Coordinates: 46°47′16″N 5°01′54″E
- Country: France
- Region: Bourgogne-Franche-Comté
- Department: Saône-et-Loire
- Arrondissement: Chalon-sur-Saône
- Canton: Ouroux-sur-Saône
- Area^{1}: 6.44 km^{2} (2.49 sq mi)
- Elevation: 209 m (686 ft)
- Highest elevation: 218 m (715 ft)
- Lowest elevation: 190 m (620 ft)
- Population (2023): 228
  - Density: 35.4/km^{2} (91.7/sq mi)
- Time zone: UTC+01:00 (CET)
  - Summer (DST): UTC+02:00 (CEST)
- INSEE/Postal code: 71228 /71620
- ^{1} French Land Register data, which excludes lakes, ponds, glaciers > 1 km^{2} (0.386 sq mi or 247 acres) and river estuaries.

Guerfand (French pronunciation: [ɡɛʁfɑ̃]) is a commune in the Saône-et-Loire department in the region of Bourgogne-Franche-Comté in eastern France.

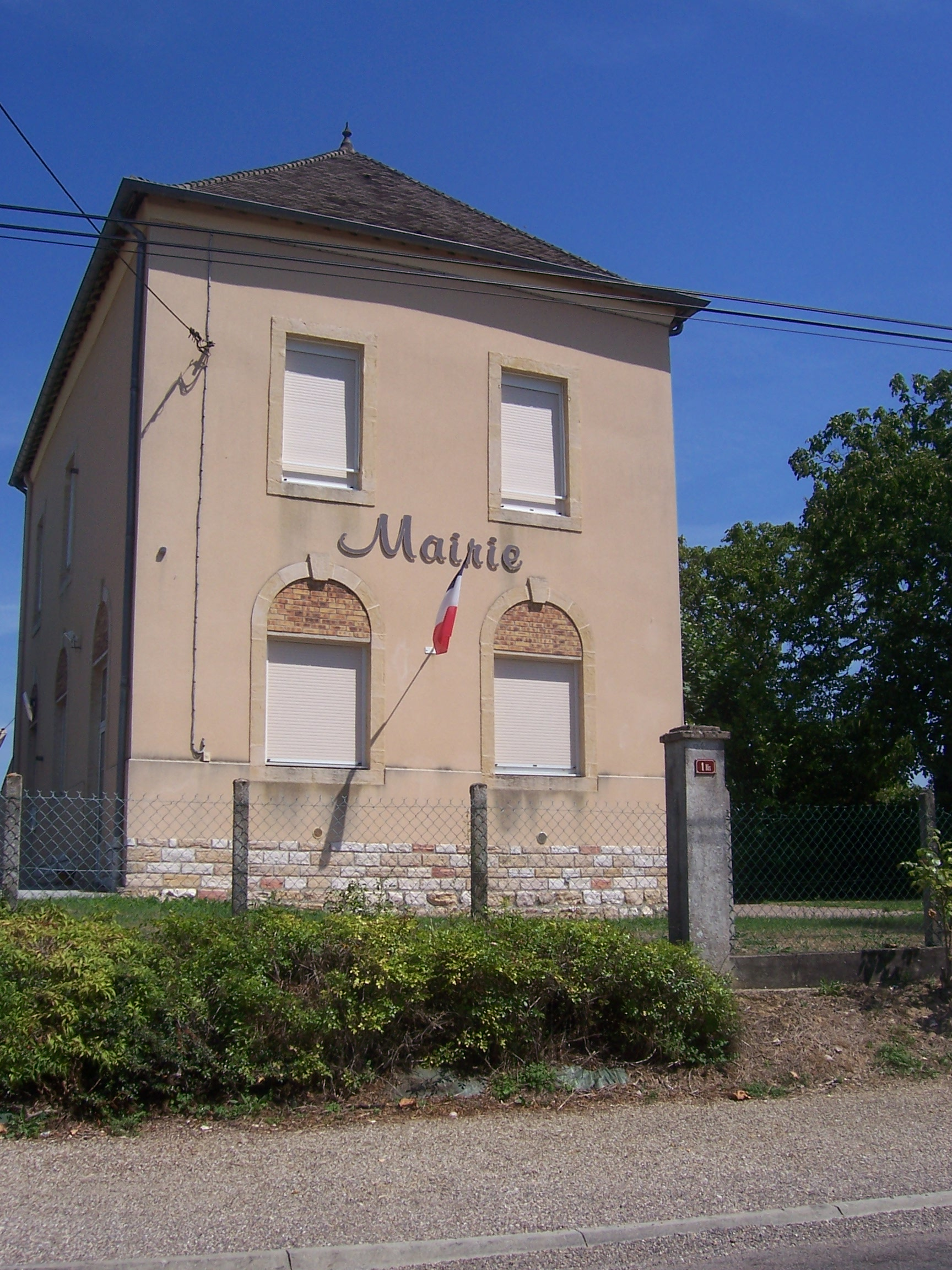
Town hall

== See also ==
- Communes of the Saône-et-Loire department
