= Saint-Christophe-en-Bresse =

- Commune
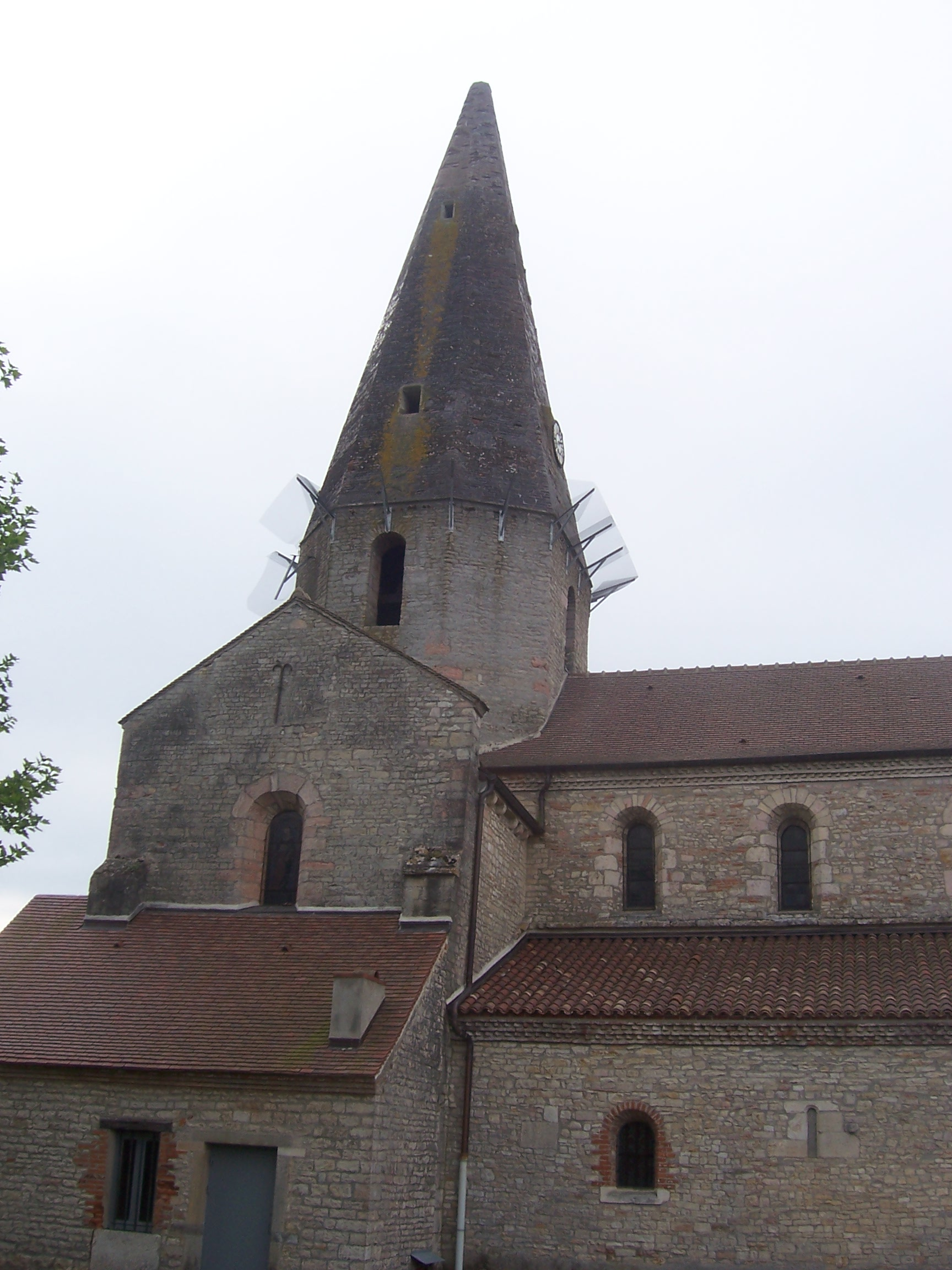
- The church in Saint-Christophe-en-Bresse
- Location of Saint-Christophe-en-Bresse
- Location within France Location within Bourgogne-Franche-Comté
- Coordinates: 46°45′10″N 4°59′21″E
- Country: France
- Region: Bourgogne-Franche-Comté
- Department: Saône-et-Loire
- Arrondissement: Louhans
- Canton: Ouroux-sur-Saône
- Area^{1}: 20.39 km^{2} (7.87 sq mi)
- Elevation: 200 m (660 ft)
- Highest elevation: 215 m (705 ft)
- Lowest elevation: 178 m (584 ft)
- Population (2023): 1,090
  - Density: 53.5/km^{2} (138/sq mi)
- Time zone: UTC+01:00 (CET)
  - Summer (DST): UTC+02:00 (CEST)
- INSEE/Postal code: 71398 /71370
- ^{1} French Land Register data, which excludes lakes, ponds, glaciers > 1 km^{2} (0.386 sq mi or 247 acres) and river estuaries.

Saint-Christophe-en-Bresse (French pronunciation: [sɛ̃ kʁistɔf ɑ̃ bʁɛs], literally Saint-Christophe in Bresse) is a commune in the Saône-et-Loire department in the region of Bourgogne-Franche-Comté in eastern France.

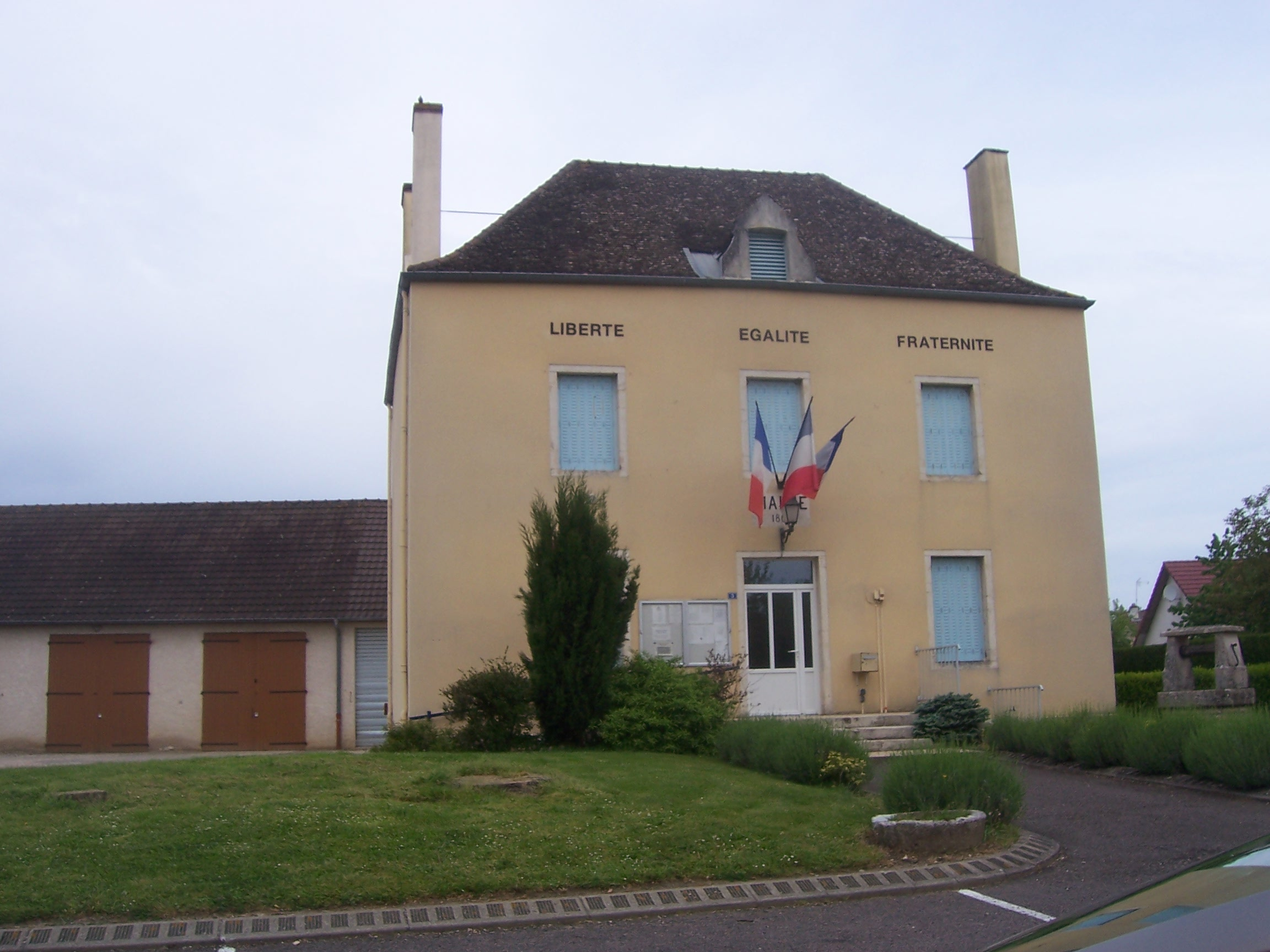
Town hall

== See also ==
- Communes of the Saône-et-Loire department
