= Lans, Saône-et-Loire =

Lans
- Commune
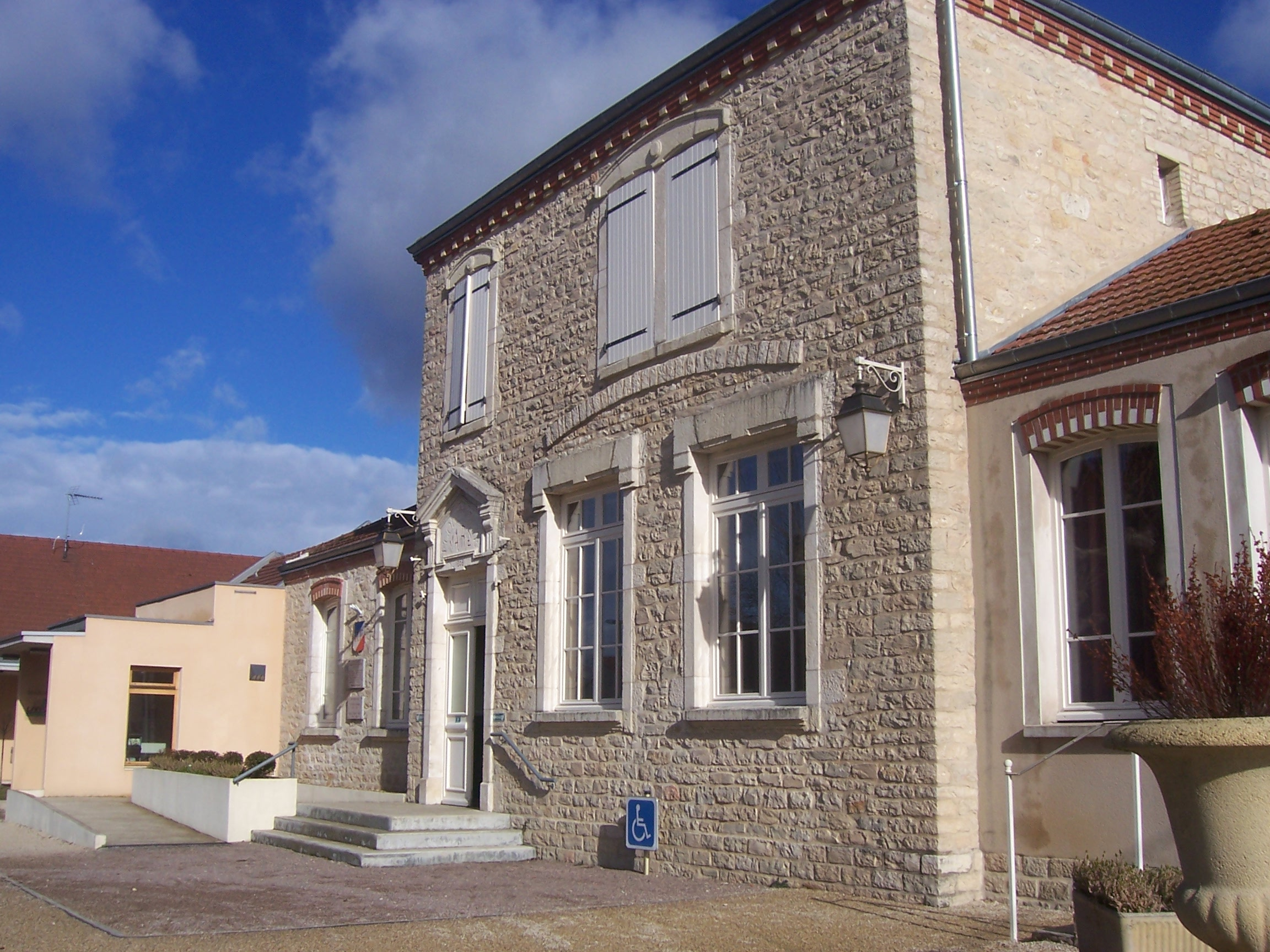
- Town hall
- Location of Lans
- Location within France Location within Bourgogne-Franche-Comté
- Coordinates: 46°46′15″N 4°55′25″E
- Country: France
- Region: Bourgogne-Franche-Comté
- Department: Saône-et-Loire
- Arrondissement: Chalon-sur-Saône
- Canton: Ouroux-sur-Saône
- Intercommunality: CA Le Grand Chalon
- Area^{1}: 8.11 km^{2} (3.13 sq mi)
- Elevation: 182 m (597 ft)
- Highest elevation: 195 m (640 ft)
- Lowest elevation: 176 m (577 ft)
- Population (2023): 952
  - Density: 117/km^{2} (304/sq mi)
- Time zone: UTC+01:00 (CET)
  - Summer (DST): UTC+02:00 (CEST)
- INSEE/Postal code: 71253 /71380
- ^{1} French Land Register data, which excludes lakes, ponds, glaciers > 1 km^{2} (0.386 sq mi or 247 acres) and river estuaries.

Lans is a commune in the Saône-et-Loire department in the region of Bourgogne-Franche-Comté in eastern France.

== See also ==
- Communes of the Saône-et-Loire department
