= Baudrières =

- Commune
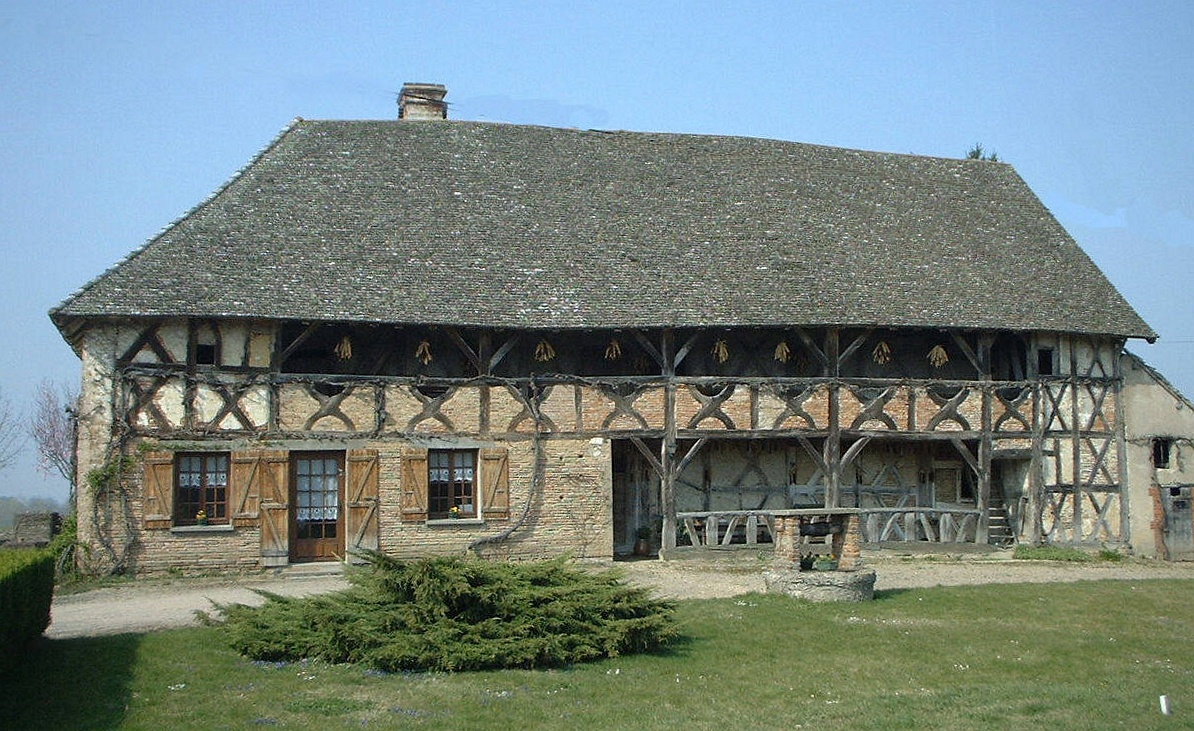
- Typical old Bresse farmhouse
- Location of Baudrières
- Location within France Location within Bourgogne-Franche-Comté
- Coordinates: 46°40′29″N 5°00′48″E
- Country: France
- Region: Bourgogne-Franche-Comté
- Department: Saône-et-Loire
- Arrondissement: Louhans
- Canton: Ouroux-sur-Saône
- Intercommunality: Terres de Bresse
- Area^{1}: 27 km^{2} (10 sq mi)
- Elevation: 194 m (636 ft)
- Highest elevation: 216 m (709 ft)
- Lowest elevation: 172 m (564 ft)
- Population (2023): 1,044
  - Density: 39/km^{2} (100/sq mi)
- Time zone: UTC+01:00 (CET)
  - Summer (DST): UTC+02:00 (CEST)
- INSEE/Postal code: 71023 /71370
- ^{1} French Land Register data, which excludes lakes, ponds, glaciers > 1 km^{2} (0.386 sq mi or 247 acres) and river estuaries.

Baudrières (French pronunciation: [bodʁijɛʁ]) is a commune in the Saône-et-Loire department in the region of Bourgogne-Franche-Comté in eastern France.

== Geography ==
The commune lies on the plain of Bresse in the east of the department.

== Population ==
Historical population
Year	Pop.	±% p.a.
1968	713	—
1975	666	−0.97%
1982	778	+2.25%
1990	792	+0.22%
1999	798	+0.08%
2007	860	+0.94%
2012	917	+1.29%
2017	947	+0.65%
2023	1,044	+1.64%
Source: INSEE

== See also ==
- Communes of the Saône-et-Loire department
