= Tronchy =

- Commune
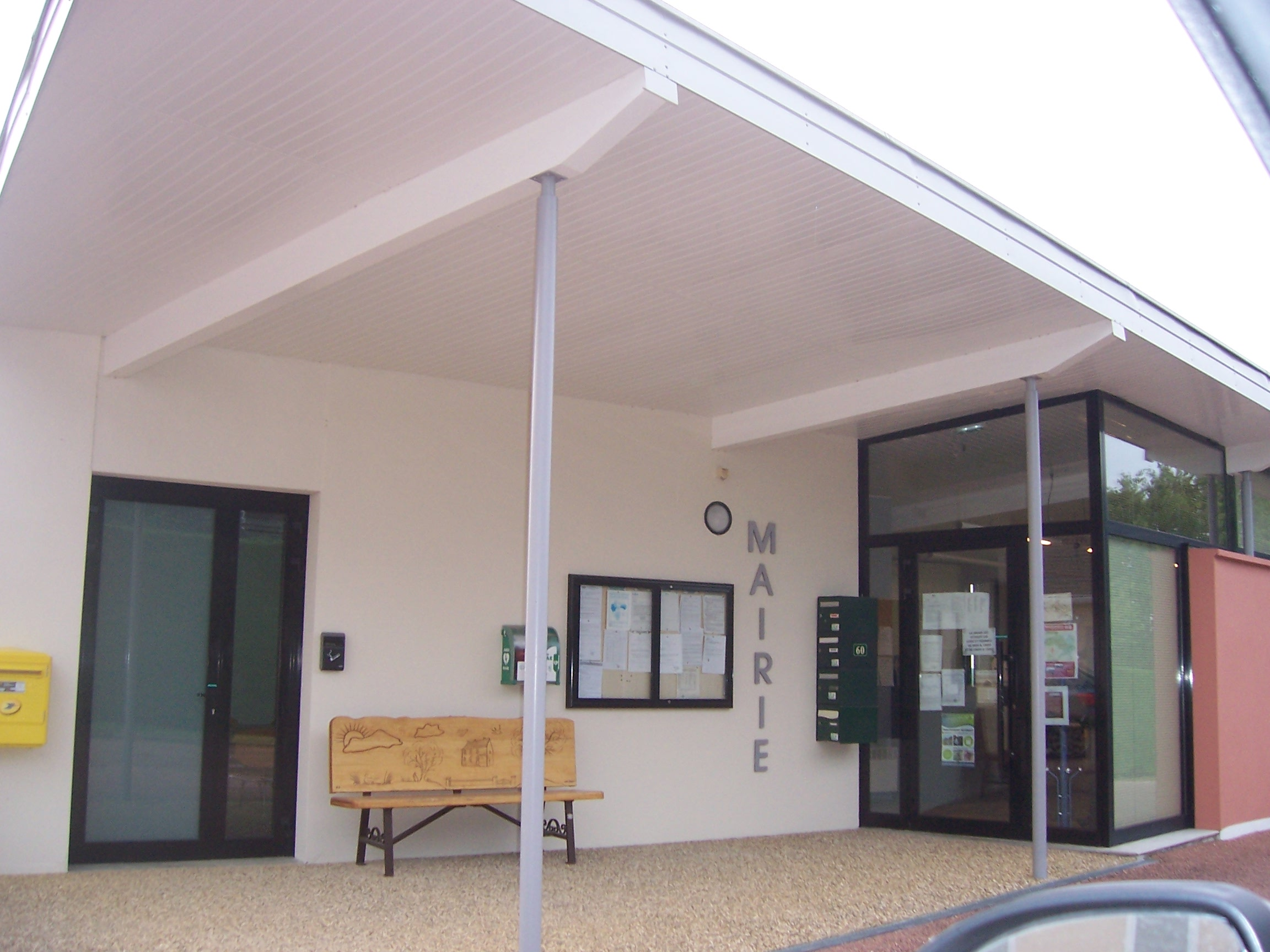
- Town hall
- Location of Tronchy
- Location within France Location within Bourgogne-Franche-Comté
- Coordinates: 46°43′41″N 5°04′20″E
- Country: France
- Region: Bourgogne-Franche-Comté
- Department: Saône-et-Loire
- Arrondissement: Louhans
- Canton: Ouroux-sur-Saône
- Area^{1}: 7.76 km^{2} (3.00 sq mi)
- Elevation: 200 m (660 ft)
- Highest elevation: 211 m (692 ft)
- Lowest elevation: 183 m (600 ft)
- Population (2023): 240
  - Density: 31/km^{2} (80/sq mi)
- Time zone: UTC+01:00 (CET)
  - Summer (DST): UTC+02:00 (CEST)
- INSEE/Postal code: 71548 /71440
- ^{1} French Land Register data, which excludes lakes, ponds, glaciers > 1 km^{2} (0.386 sq mi or 247 acres) and river estuaries.

Tronchy (French pronunciation: [tʁɔ̃ʃi]) is a commune in the Saône-et-Loire department in the region of Bourgogne-Franche-Comté in eastern France.

== See also ==
- Communes of the Saône-et-Loire department
