= Ouroux-sur-Saône =

- Commune
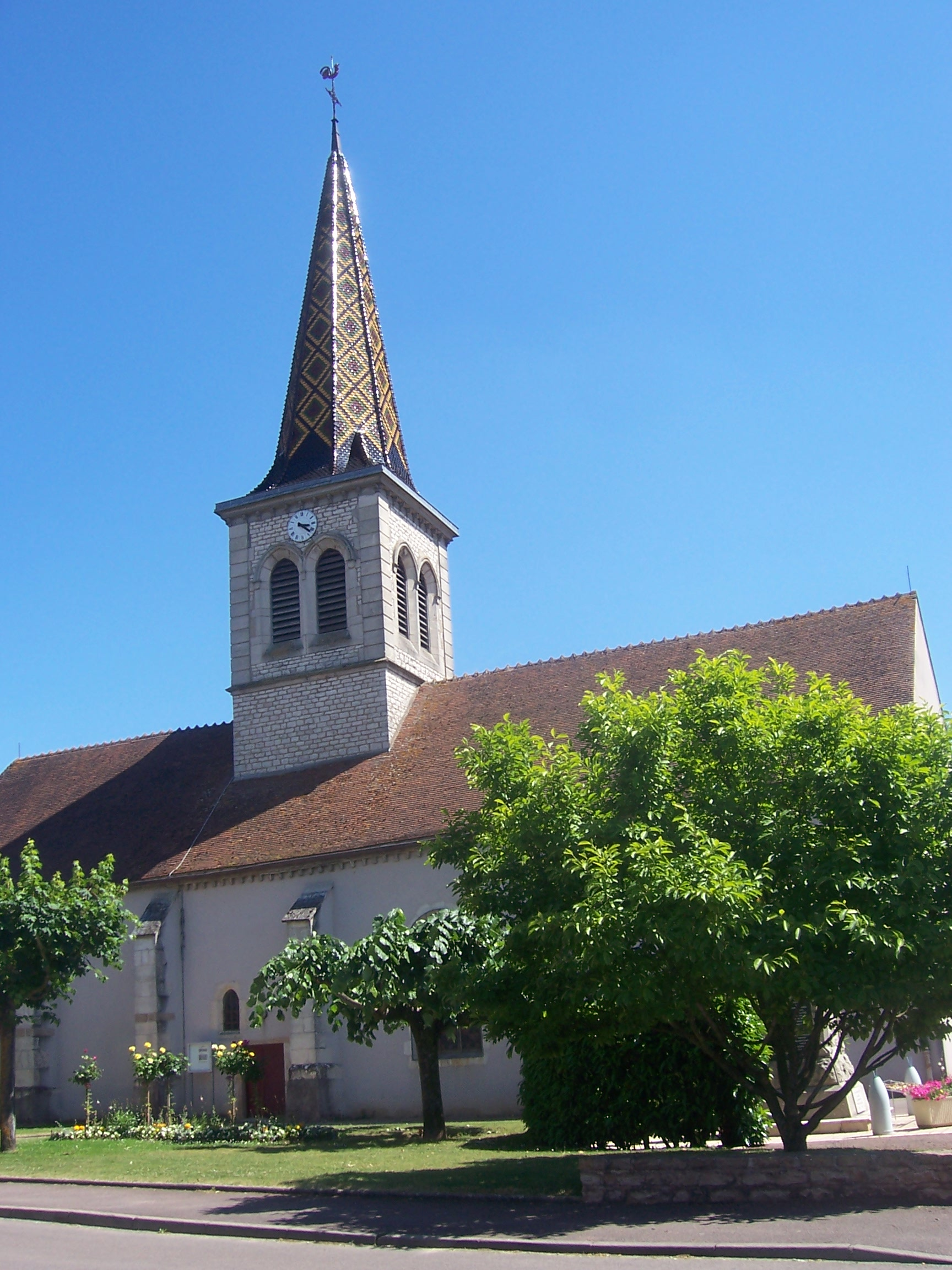
- The church in Ouroux-sur-Saône

- Coat of arms
- Location of Ouroux-sur-Saône
- Location within France Location within Bourgogne-Franche-Comté
- Coordinates: 46°43′23″N 4°57′18″E
- Country: France
- Region: Bourgogne-Franche-Comté
- Department: Saône-et-Loire
- Arrondissement: Louhans
- Canton: Ouroux-sur-Saône

Government
  - Mayor (2020–2026): Jean-Michel Desmard
- Area^{1}: 22.62 km^{2} (8.73 sq mi)
- Elevation: 200 m (660 ft)
- Highest elevation: 197 m (646 ft)
- Lowest elevation: 171 m (561 ft)
- Population (2023): 3,214
  - Density: 142.1/km^{2} (368.0/sq mi)
- Time zone: UTC+01:00 (CET)
  - Summer (DST): UTC+02:00 (CEST)
- INSEE/Postal code: 71336 /71370
- ^{1} French Land Register data, which excludes lakes, ponds, glaciers > 1 km^{2} (0.386 sq mi or 247 acres) and river estuaries.

Ouroux-sur-Saône (French pronunciation: [uʁu syʁ son], literally Ouroux on Saône) is a commune in the Saône-et-Loire department in the region of Bourgogne-Franche-Comté in eastern France.

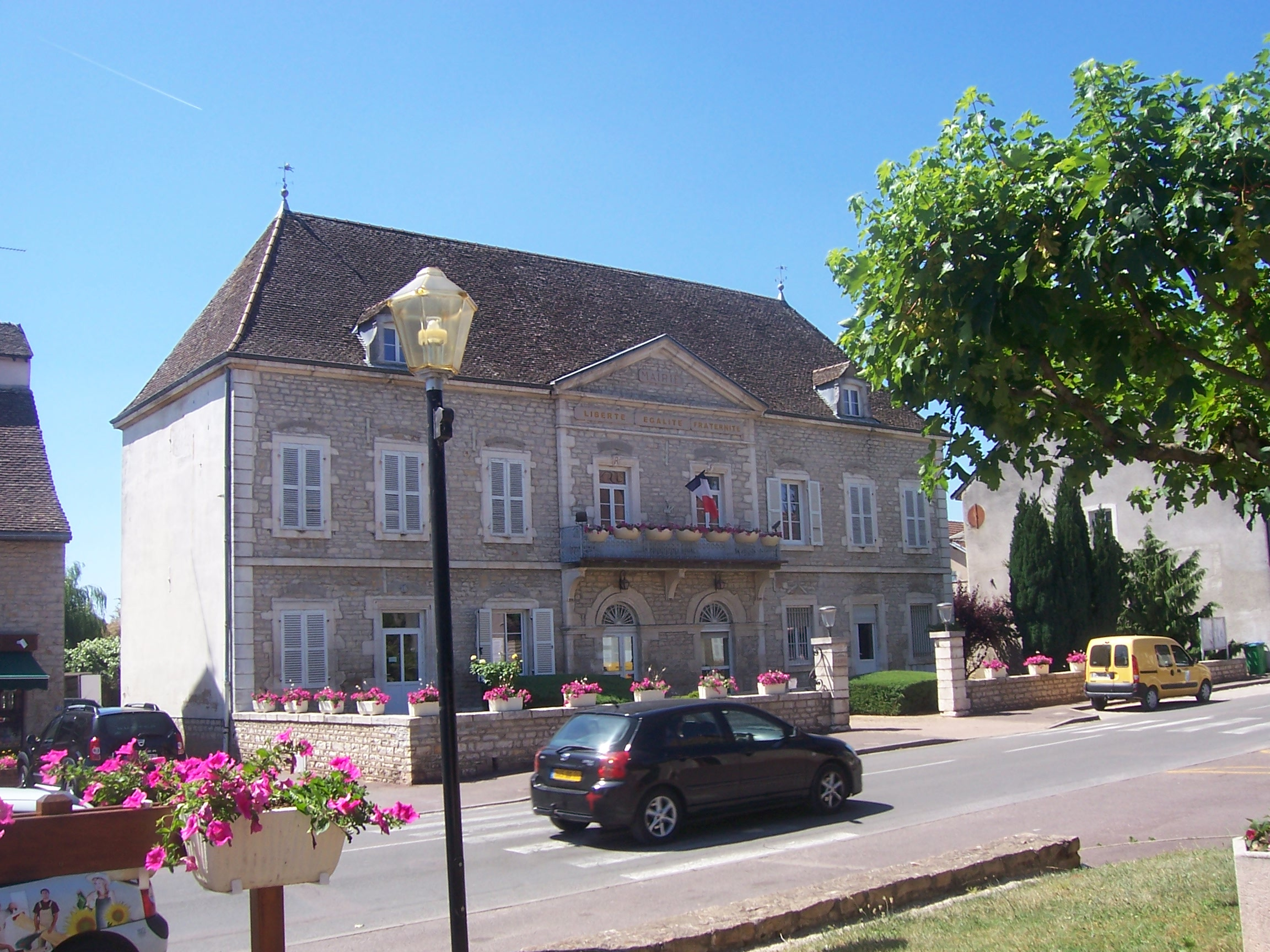
Town hall

== Population ==
Historical population
Year	Pop.	±% p.a.
1968	1,842	—
1975	1,815	−0.21%
1982	2,099	+2.10%
1990	2,294	+1.12%
1999	2,504	+0.98%
2007	2,846	+1.61%
2012	3,021	+1.20%
2017	3,072	+0.34%
2023	3,214	+0.76%
Source: INSEE

== See also ==
- Communes of the Saône-et-Loire department
