= Châtenoy-en-Bresse =

- Commune
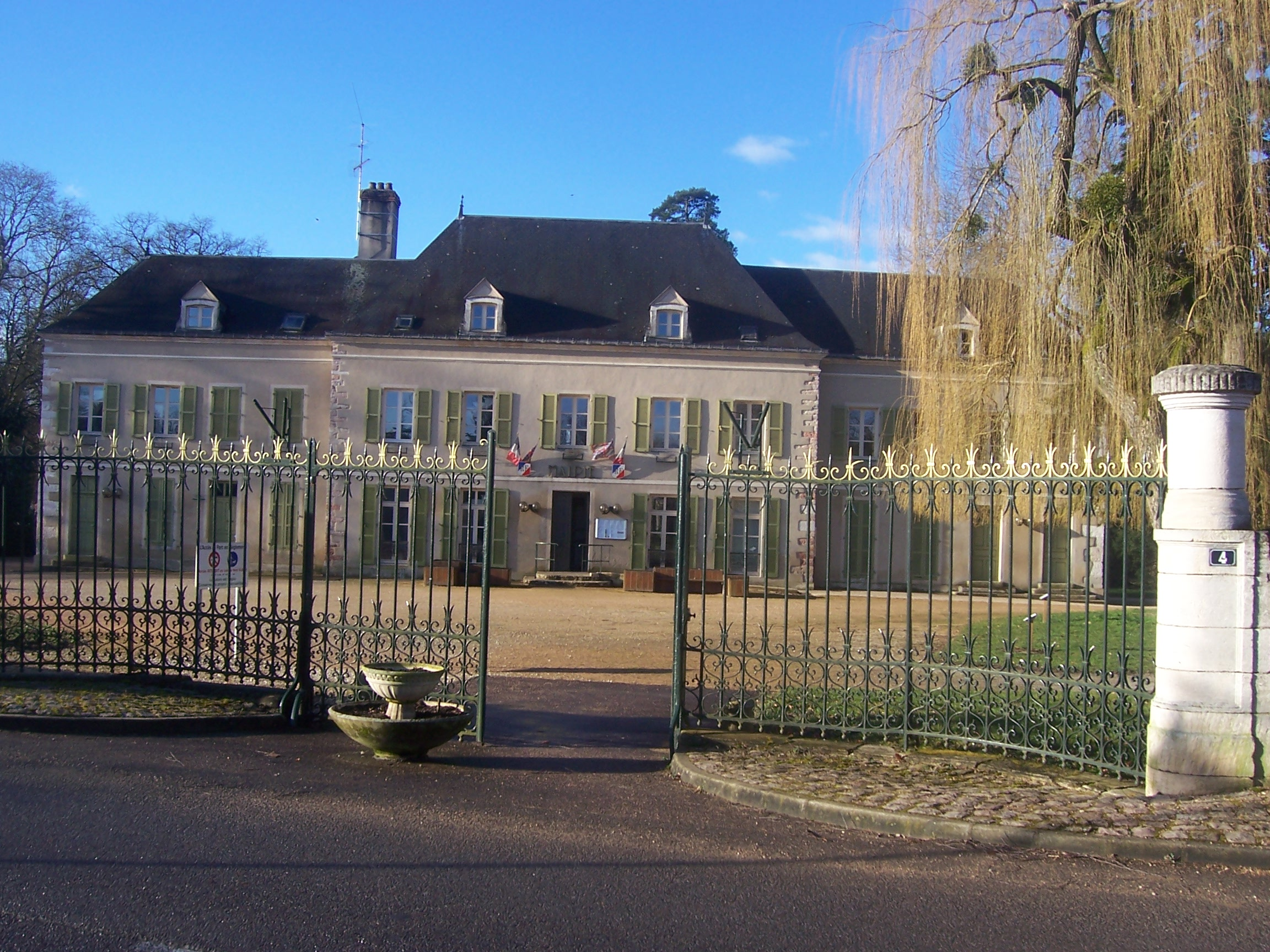
- Town hall
- Location of Châtenoy-en-Bresse
- Location within France Location within Bourgogne-Franche-Comté
- Coordinates: 46°47′33″N 4°54′50″E
- Country: France
- Region: Bourgogne-Franche-Comté
- Department: Saône-et-Loire
- Arrondissement: Chalon-sur-Saône
- Canton: Ouroux-sur-Saône
- Intercommunality: CA Le Grand Chalon

Government
  - Mayor (2020–2026): Joëlle Schwob
- Area^{1}: 6.69 km^{2} (2.58 sq mi)
- Elevation: 175 m (574 ft)
- Highest elevation: 212 m (696 ft)
- Lowest elevation: 172 m (564 ft)
- Population (2023): 1,144
  - Density: 171/km^{2} (443/sq mi)
- Time zone: UTC+01:00 (CET)
  - Summer (DST): UTC+02:00 (CEST)
- INSEE/Postal code: 71117 /71380
- ^{1} French Land Register data, which excludes lakes, ponds, glaciers > 1 km^{2} (0.386 sq mi or 247 acres) and river estuaries.

Châtenoy-en-Bresse (French pronunciation: [ʃatnwa ɑ̃ bʁɛs], literally Châtenoy in Bresse) is a commune in the Saône-et-Loire department in the region of Bourgogne-Franche-Comté in eastern France.

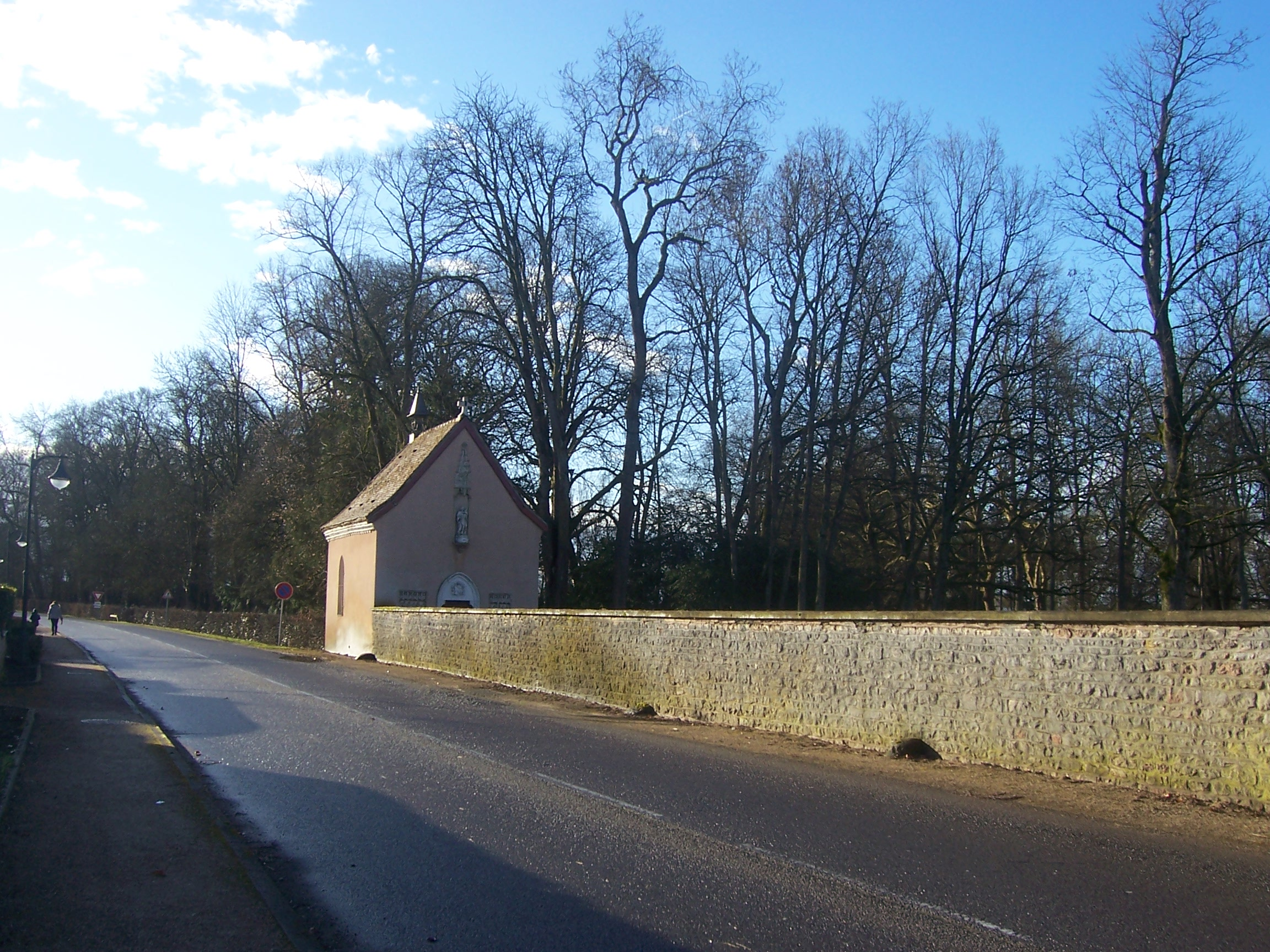
Chapel

== See also ==
- Communes of the Saône-et-Loire department
