= Saint-Martin-en-Bresse =

- Commune
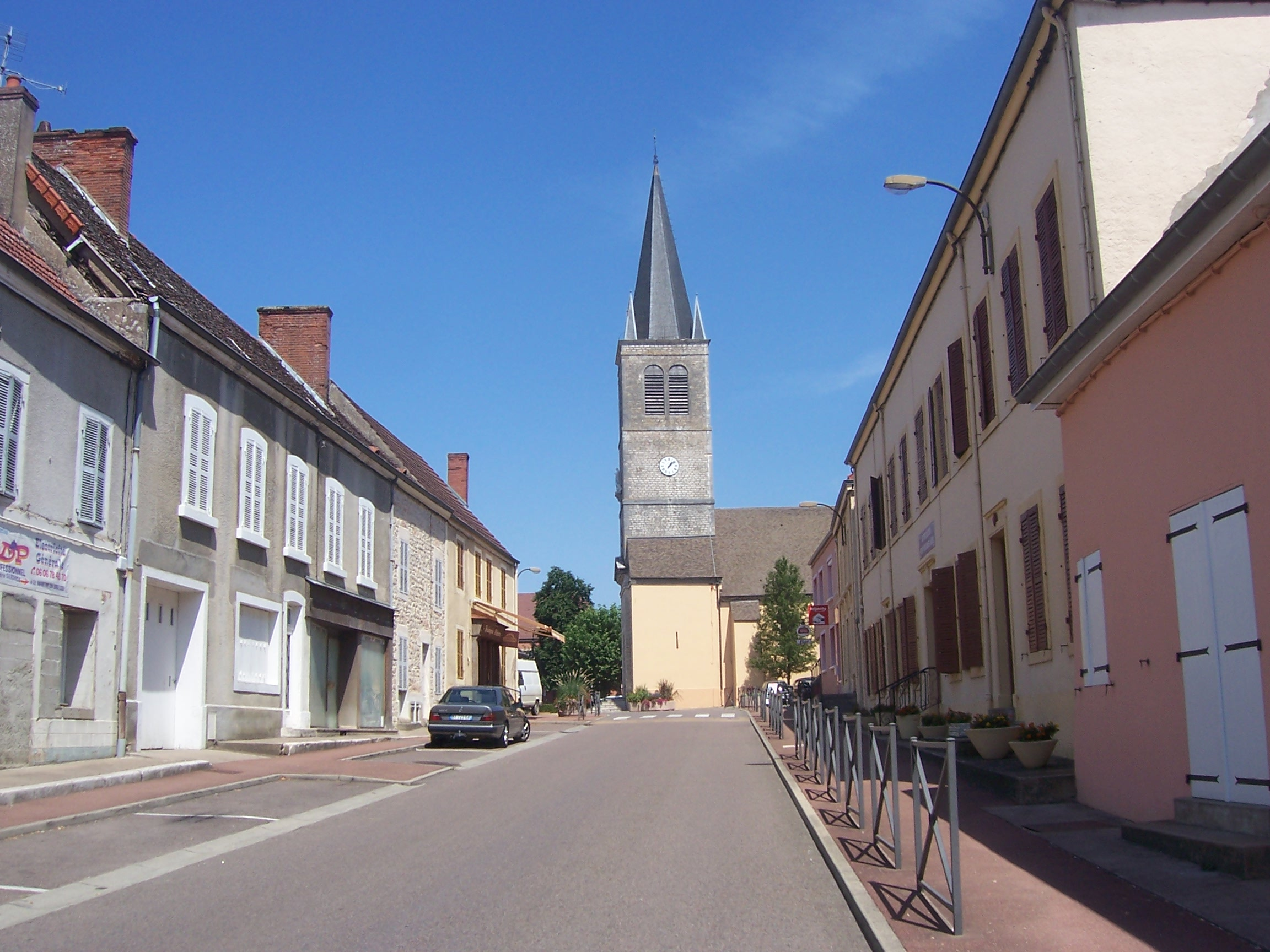
- The church and surroundings in Saint-Martin-en-Bresse

- Coat of arms
- Location of Saint-Martin-en-Bresse
- Location within France Location within Bourgogne-Franche-Comté
- Coordinates: 46°49′03″N 5°03′40″E
- Country: France
- Region: Bourgogne-Franche-Comté
- Department: Saône-et-Loire
- Arrondissement: Chalon-sur-Saône
- Canton: Ouroux-sur-Saône
- Intercommunality: CC Saône Doubs Bresse

Government
  - Mayor (2020–2026): Guy Gaudry
- Area^{1}: 34.59 km^{2} (13.36 sq mi)
- Elevation: 192 m (630 ft)
- Highest elevation: 217 m (712 ft)
- Lowest elevation: 179 m (587 ft)
- Population (2023): 1,905
  - Density: 55.07/km^{2} (142.6/sq mi)
- Time zone: UTC+01:00 (CET)
  - Summer (DST): UTC+02:00 (CEST)
- INSEE/Postal code: 71456 /71620
- ^{1} French Land Register data, which excludes lakes, ponds, glaciers > 1 km^{2} (0.386 sq mi or 247 acres) and river estuaries.

Saint-Martin-en-Bresse (French pronunciation: [sɛ̃ maʁtɛ̃ ɑ̃ bʁɛs], literally Saint-Martin in Bresse) is a commune in the Saône-et-Loire department in the region of Bourgogne-Franche-Comté in eastern France.

== See also ==
- Communes of the Saône-et-Loire department
