= Lessard-en-Bresse =

- Commune
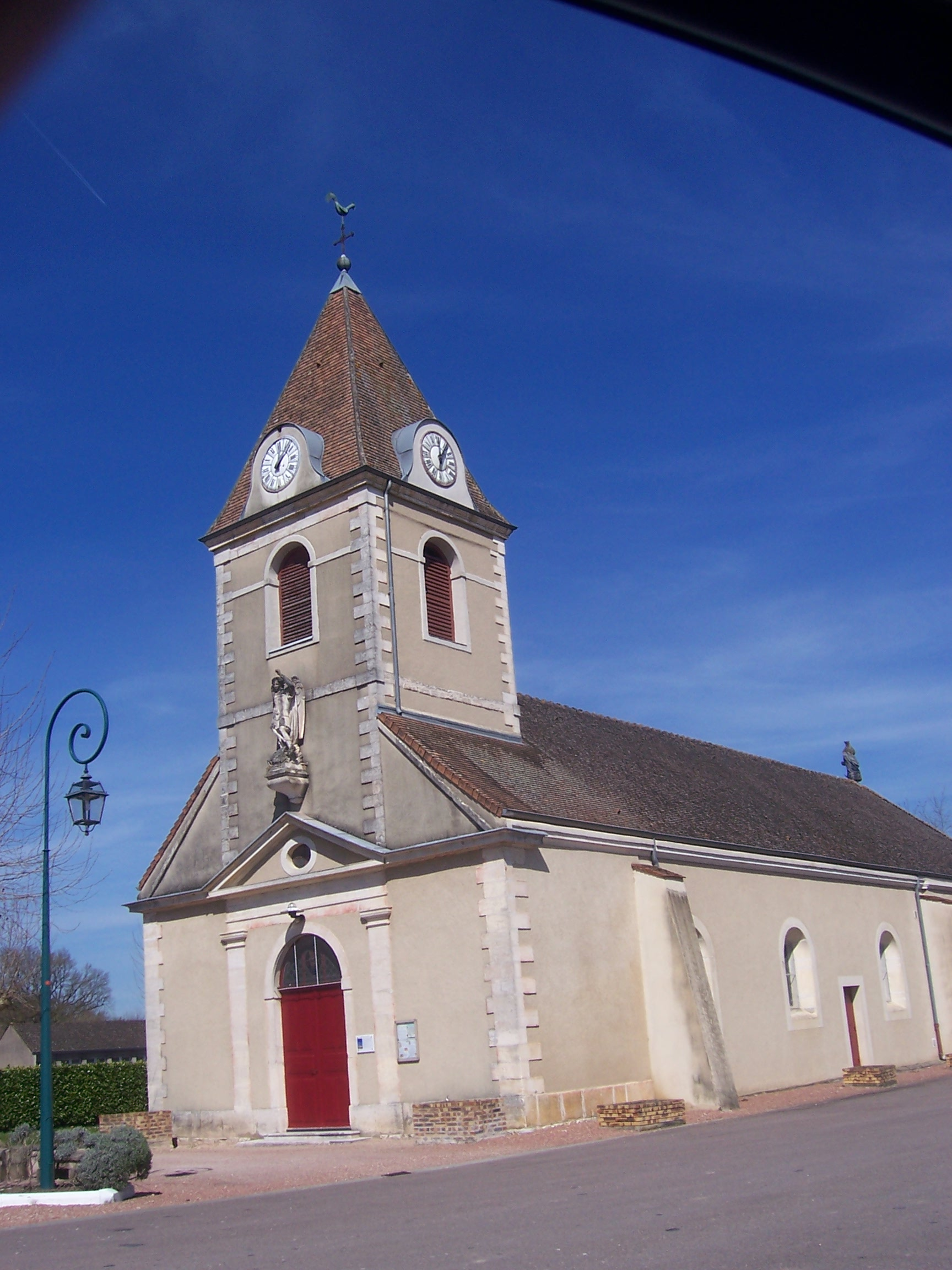
- The church in Lessard-en-Bresse
- Location of Lessard-en-Bresse
- Location within France Location within Bourgogne-Franche-Comté
- Coordinates: 46°44′29″N 5°05′40″E
- Country: France
- Region: Bourgogne-Franche-Comté
- Department: Saône-et-Loire
- Arrondissement: Louhans
- Canton: Ouroux-sur-Saône
- Area^{1}: 8.2 km^{2} (3.2 sq mi)
- Elevation: 200 m (660 ft)
- Highest elevation: 214 m (702 ft)
- Lowest elevation: 187 m (614 ft)
- Population (2023): 561
  - Density: 68/km^{2} (180/sq mi)
- Time zone: UTC+01:00 (CET)
  - Summer (DST): UTC+02:00 (CEST)
- INSEE/Postal code: 71256 /71440
- ^{1} French Land Register data, which excludes lakes, ponds, glaciers > 1 km^{2} (0.386 sq mi or 247 acres) and river estuaries.

Lessard-en-Bresse (French pronunciation: [lɛsaʁ ɑ̃ bʁɛs], literally Lessard in Bresse) is a commune in the Saône-et-Loire department in the region of Bourgogne-Franche-Comté in eastern France.

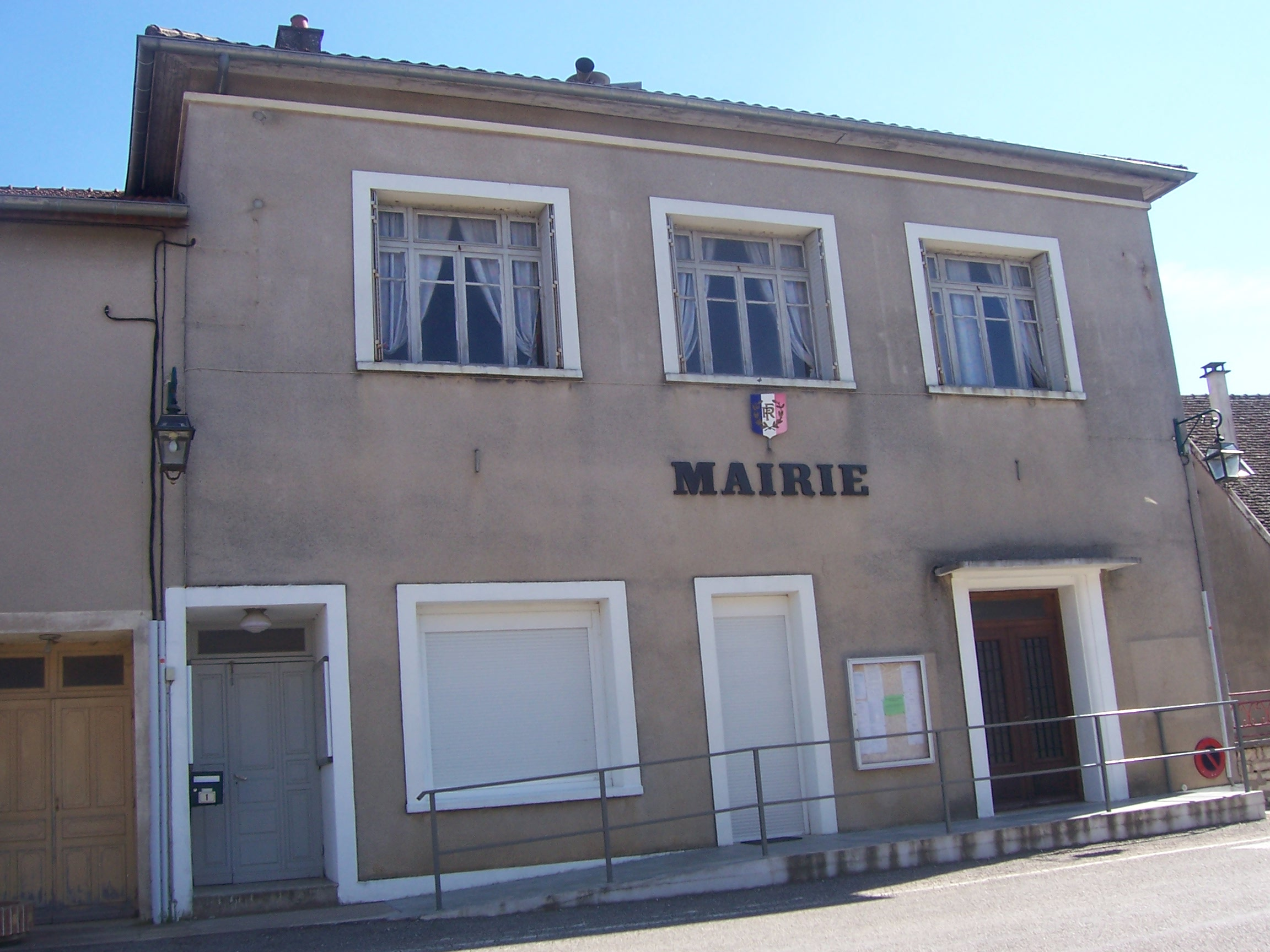
Town hall

== See also ==
- Communes of the Saône-et-Loire department
