= Le Miroir =

Le Miroir (literally the mirror in French) may refer to:

- Le Miroir, Saône-et-Loire, a French commune
- Le Miroir (magazine), a 1910s weekly supplement of the Le Petit Parisien
- Le Miroir (newspaper), a newspaper published during the French Revolution

== See also ==
- Le Miroir à deux faces
- Le Miroir de l'eau
- Le miroir de Cassandre
