= Miroir =

Miroir (French "mirror") may refer to:

- Miroir (film), 1947 with Jean Gabin
- Miroir (album) by Marie-Mai 2012
- Miroirs, a suite by French composer Maurice Ravel

== Geography ==
- Le Miroir, Saône-et-Loire
- Le Miroir, hamlet Sainte-Foy-Tarentaise
