= Dommartin-lès-Cuiseaux =

- Commune
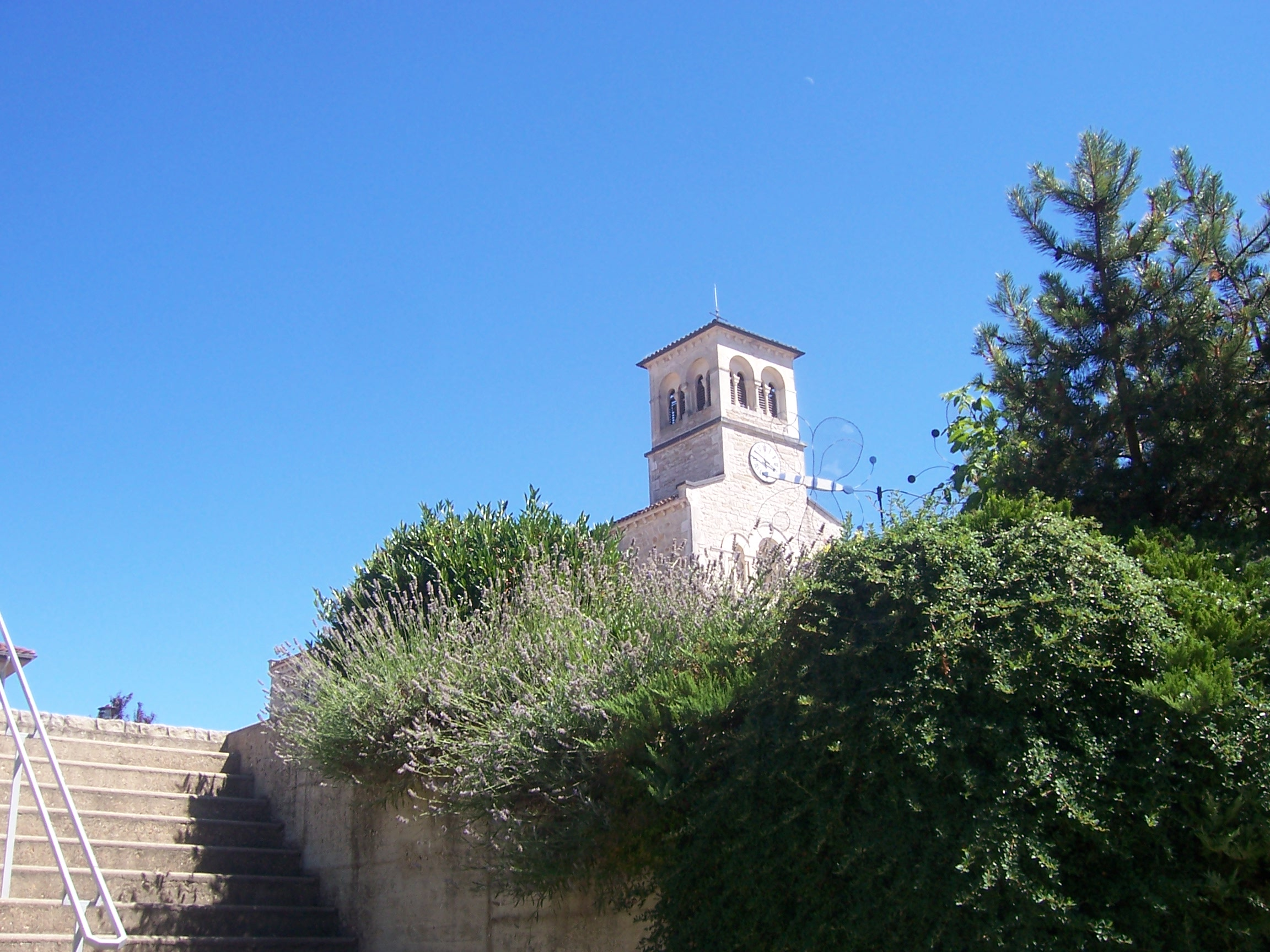
- The church in Dommartin-lès-Cuiseaux
- Location of Dommartin-lès-Cuiseaux
- Location within France Location within Bourgogne-Franche-Comté
- Coordinates: 46°30′00″N 5°17′59″E
- Country: France
- Region: Bourgogne-Franche-Comté
- Department: Saône-et-Loire
- Arrondissement: Louhans
- Canton: Cuiseaux
- Area^{1}: 18.86 km^{2} (7.28 sq mi)
- Elevation: 215 m (705 ft)
- Highest elevation: 226 m (741 ft)
- Lowest elevation: 182 m (597 ft)
- Population (2023): 801
  - Density: 42.5/km^{2} (110/sq mi)
- Time zone: UTC+01:00 (CET)
  - Summer (DST): UTC+02:00 (CEST)
- INSEE/Postal code: 71177 /71480
- ^{1} French Land Register data, which excludes lakes, ponds, glaciers > 1 km^{2} (0.386 sq mi or 247 acres) and river estuaries.

Dommartin-lès-Cuiseaux (French pronunciation: [dɔmaʁtɛ̃ lɛ kɥizo], lit. 'Dommartin near Cuiseaux') is a commune in the Saône-et-Loire department in the region of Bourgogne-Franche-Comté in eastern France.

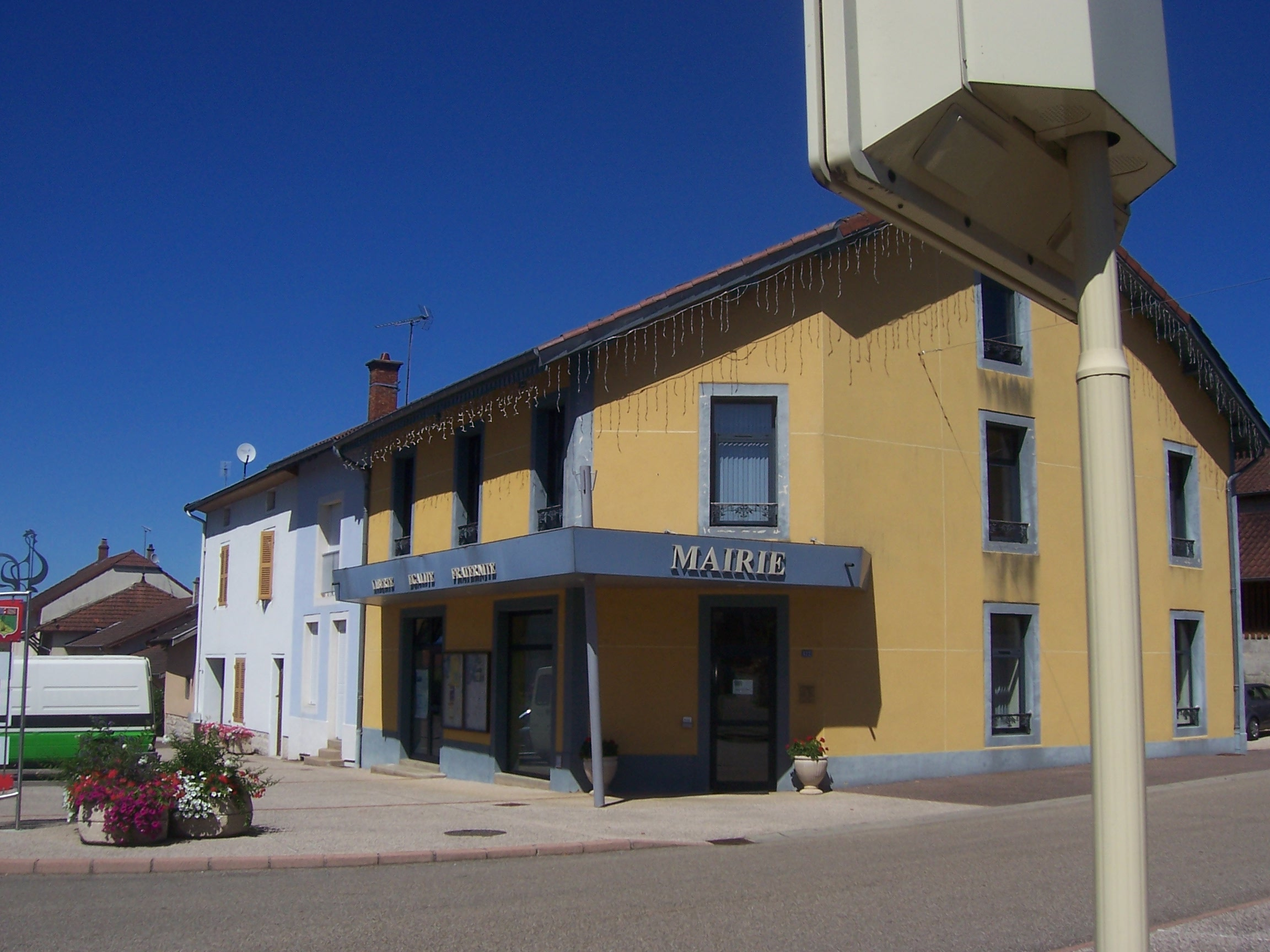
Town hall

== Geography ==
The Solnan flows north through the middle of the commune.

== Demography ==
Historical population
| Year | Pop. | ±% p.a. |
|---|---|---|
| 1968 | 844 | — |
| 1975 | 776 | −1.19% |
| 1982 | 681 | −1.85% |
| 1990 | 684 | +0.05% |
| 1999 | 636 | −0.81% |
| 2007 | 743 | +1.96% |
| 2012 | 797 | +1.41% |
| 2017 | 794 | −0.08% |
| 2023 | 801 | +0.15% |
Source: INSEE

== See also ==
- Communes of the Saône-et-Loire department
