= La Frette =

La Frette may refer to:

- La Frette, Isère, a commune in the French region of Rhône-Alpes
- La Frette, Saône-et-Loire a commune in the French region of Bourgogne
- La Frette-sur-Seine, a commune in the French region of Île-de-France
