= Cuisery =

- Commune
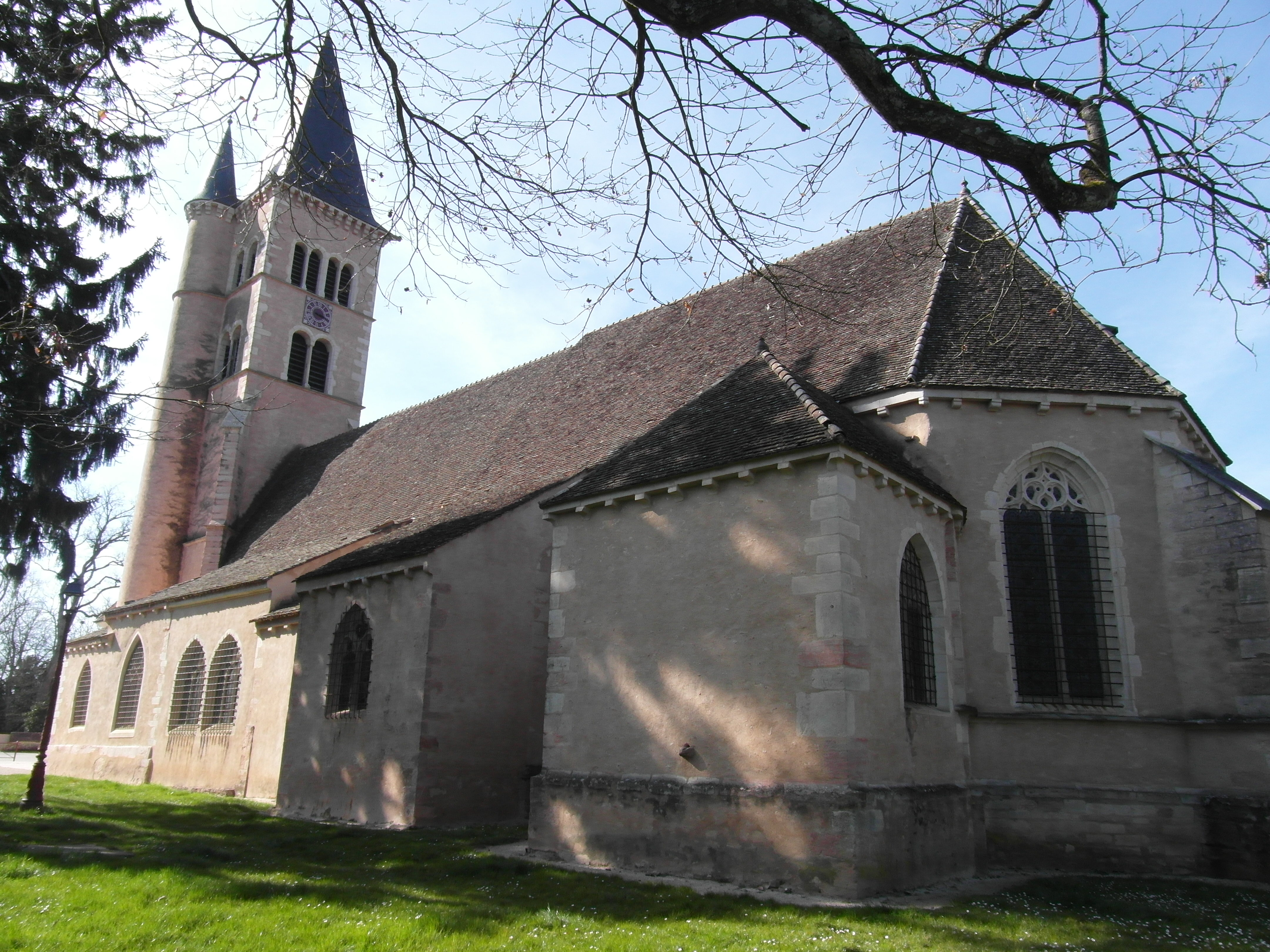

- Coat of arms
- Location of Cuisery
- Location within France Location within Bourgogne-Franche-Comté
- Coordinates: 46°33′34″N 5°00′07″E
- Country: France
- Region: Bourgogne-Franche-Comté
- Department: Saône-et-Loire
- Arrondissement: Louhans
- Canton: Cuiseaux
- Area^{1}: 11.29 km^{2} (4.36 sq mi)
- Elevation: 211 m (692 ft)
- Highest elevation: 213 m (699 ft)
- Lowest elevation: 172 m (564 ft)
- Population (2023): 1,576
  - Density: 139.6/km^{2} (361.5/sq mi)
- Time zone: UTC+01:00 (CET)
  - Summer (DST): UTC+02:00 (CEST)
- INSEE/Postal code: 71158 /71290
- ^{1} French Land Register data, which excludes lakes, ponds, glaciers > 1 km^{2} (0.386 sq mi or 247 acres) and river estuaries.

Cuisery (French pronunciation: [kɥizʁi]) is a commune in the Saône-et-Loire department in the region of Bourgogne-Franche-Comté in eastern France.

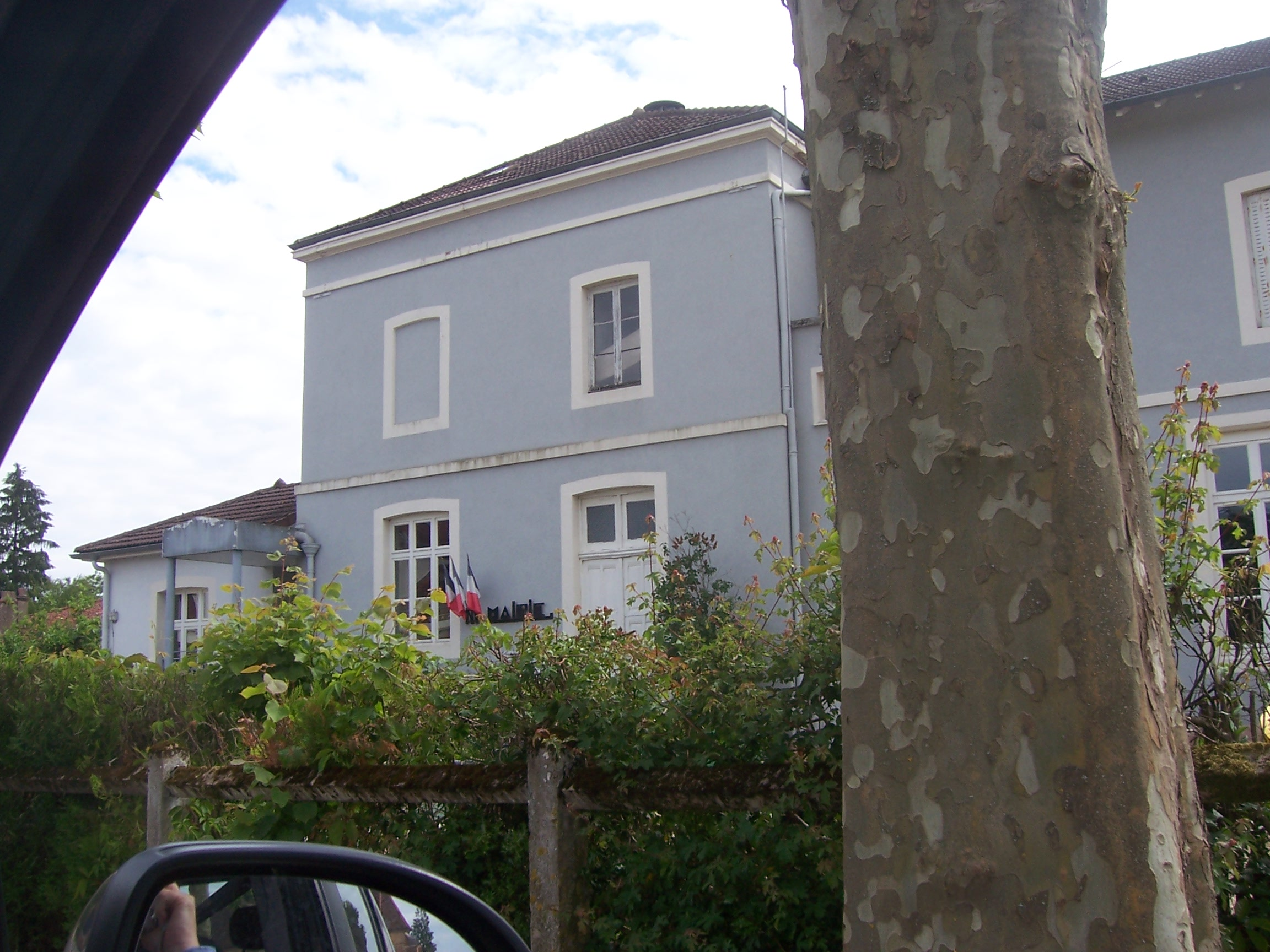
Town hall

== Geography ==
Cuisery is located on the river Seille on the left bank of the Saône River across from Tournus. It is in the southwest corner of the arrondissement of Louhans in the area known as Bresse.

== Culture ==
Cuisery is one of the towns that have established a reputation as a "book town" or "village du livres". Antiquarian booksellers, used book sellers, printers, book binding artisans and small presses gravitated here. By 1999, the town's identity was forged as a center for books and artists. Each month, typically during the first week of the month, there is a grand booksellers market. The town dates to the Middle Ages.

== Popular culture ==
- The Little Paris Bookshop, a work of romantic fiction by Nina George and translated by Simon Pare, includes a chapter describing a visit to Cuisery.

== Notable people ==
- Jules Bourcier (1797–1873), naturalist and expert on hummingbirds was born in Cuisery.

== See also ==
- Communes of the Saône-et-Loire department
