= Huilly-sur-Seille =

- Commune
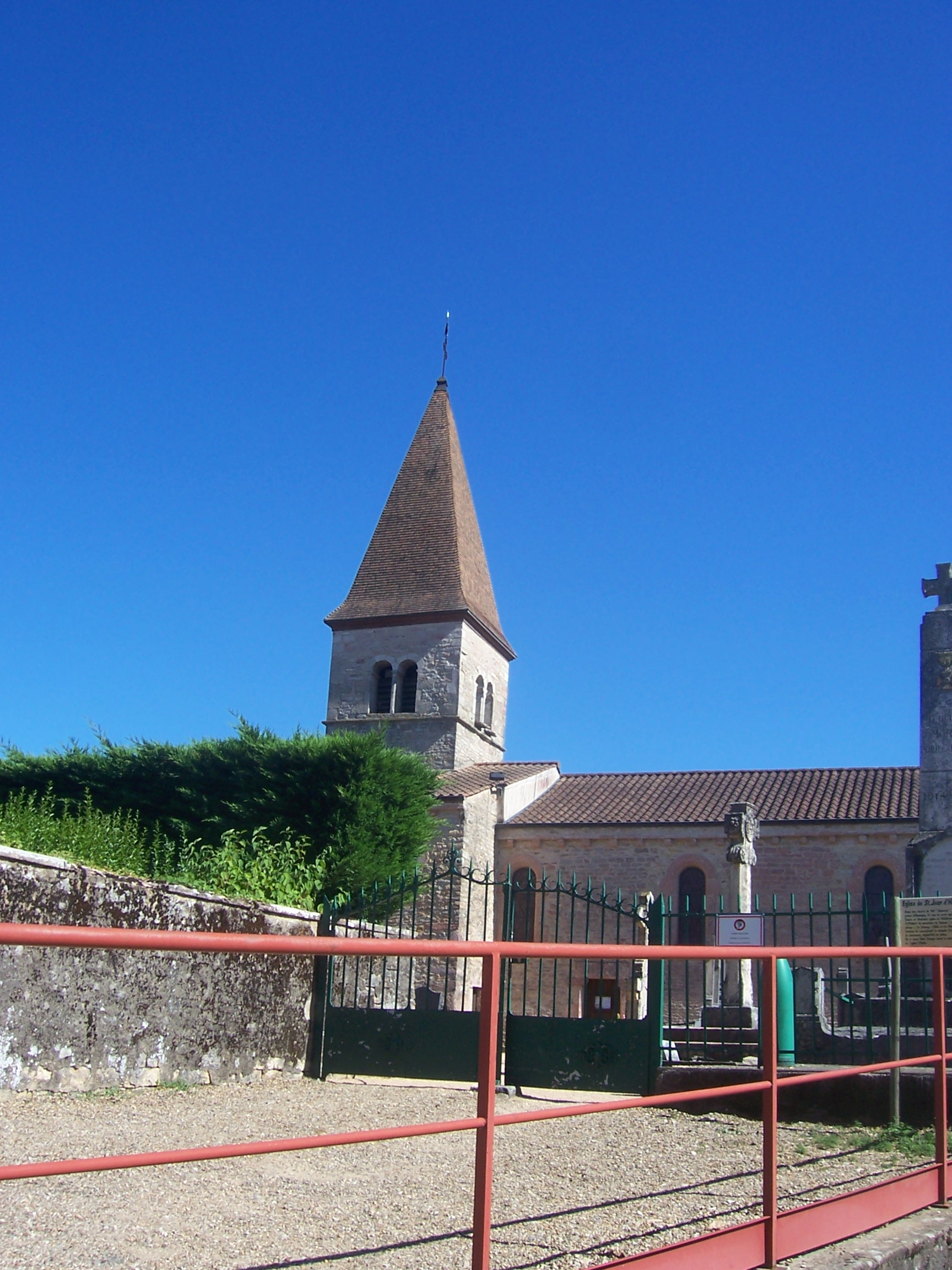
- The church in Huilly-sur-Seille
- Location of Huilly-sur-Seille
- Location within France Location within Bourgogne-Franche-Comté
- Coordinates: 46°35′34″N 5°03′10″E
- Country: France
- Region: Bourgogne-Franche-Comté
- Department: Saône-et-Loire
- Arrondissement: Louhans
- Canton: Cuiseaux

Government
  - Mayor (2022–2026): Ludovic Hautevelle
- Area^{1}: 12.13 km^{2} (4.68 sq mi)
- Elevation: 210 m (690 ft)
- Highest elevation: 213 m (699 ft)
- Lowest elevation: 173 m (568 ft)
- Population (2023): 353
  - Density: 29.1/km^{2} (75.4/sq mi)
- Time zone: UTC+01:00 (CET)
  - Summer (DST): UTC+02:00 (CEST)
- INSEE/Postal code: 71234 /71290
- ^{1} French Land Register data, which excludes lakes, ponds, glaciers > 1 km^{2} (0.386 sq mi or 247 acres) and river estuaries.

Huilly-sur-Seille is a commune in the Saône-et-Loire department in the region of Bourgogne-Franche-Comté in eastern France.

== See also ==
- Communes of the Saône-et-Loire department
