= Romenay =

- Commune
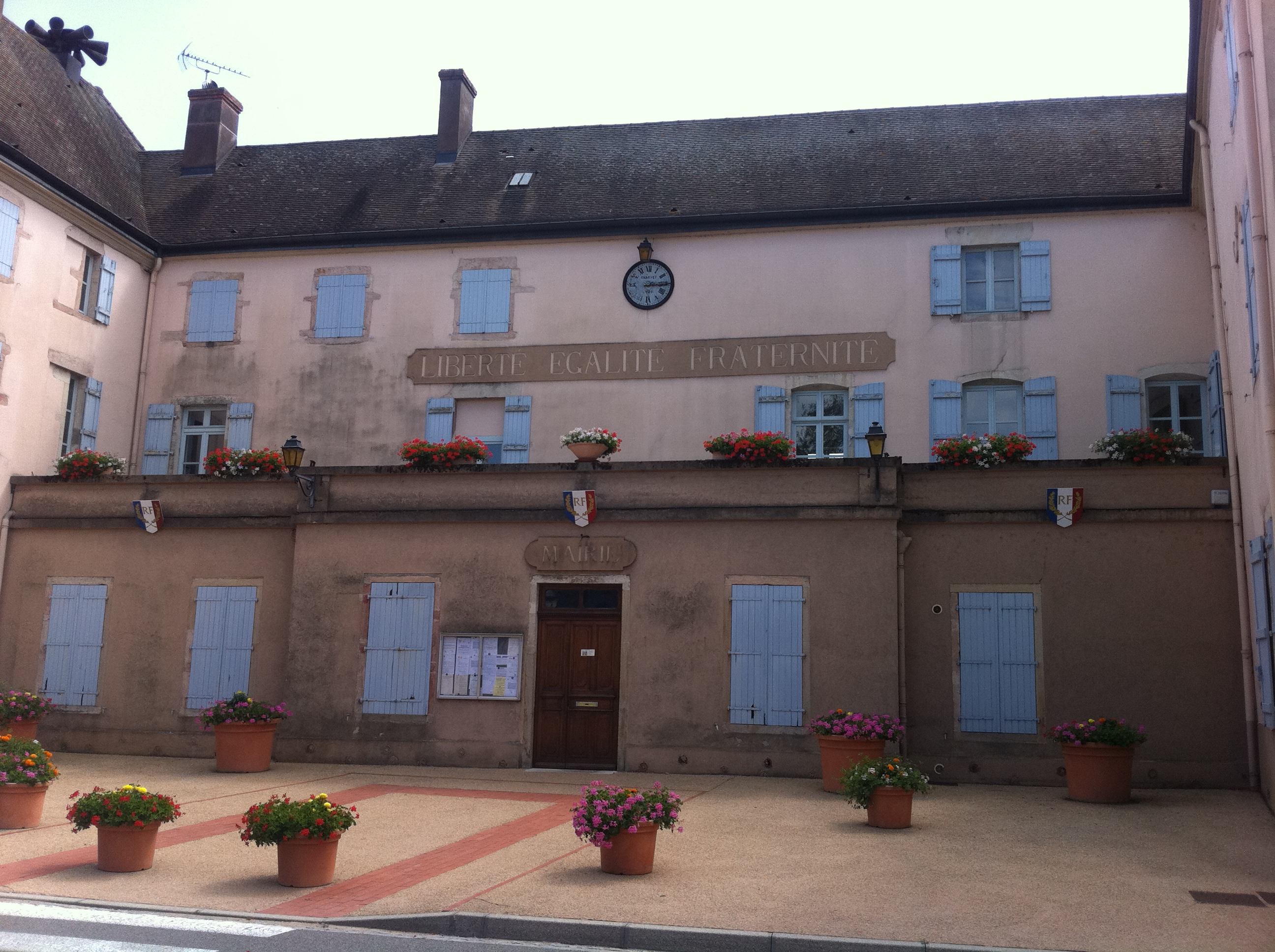
- Town hall

- Coat of arms
- Location of Romenay
- Location within France Location within Bourgogne-Franche-Comté
- Coordinates: 46°30′13″N 5°04′07″E
- Country: France
- Region: Bourgogne-Franche-Comté
- Department: Saône-et-Loire
- Arrondissement: Louhans
- Canton: Cuiseaux

Government
  - Mayor (2021–2032): Pascal Debost
- Area^{1}: 48.9 km^{2} (18.9 sq mi)
- Elevation: 204 m (669 ft)
- Highest elevation: 214 m (702 ft)
- Lowest elevation: 172 m (564 ft)
- Population (2023): 1,748
  - Density: 35.7/km^{2} (92.6/sq mi)
- Demonym: Romenayoux
- Time zone: UTC+01:00 (CET)
  - Summer (DST): UTC+02:00 (CEST)
- INSEE/Postal code: 71373 /71470
- ^{1} French Land Register data, which excludes lakes, ponds, glaciers > 1 km^{2} (0.386 sq mi or 247 acres) and river estuaries.

Romenay (French pronunciation: [ʁɔmnɛ]) is a commune in the Saône-et-Loire department in the region of Bourgogne-Franche-Comté in eastern France.

It is a medieval village surrounded by ancient walls with its typical church at the centre of town. The area is also home to the Romenay pepper, a fairly low-heat variety of capsicuum annuum.

== See also ==
- Communes of the Saône-et-Loire department
