= Joudes =

- Commune
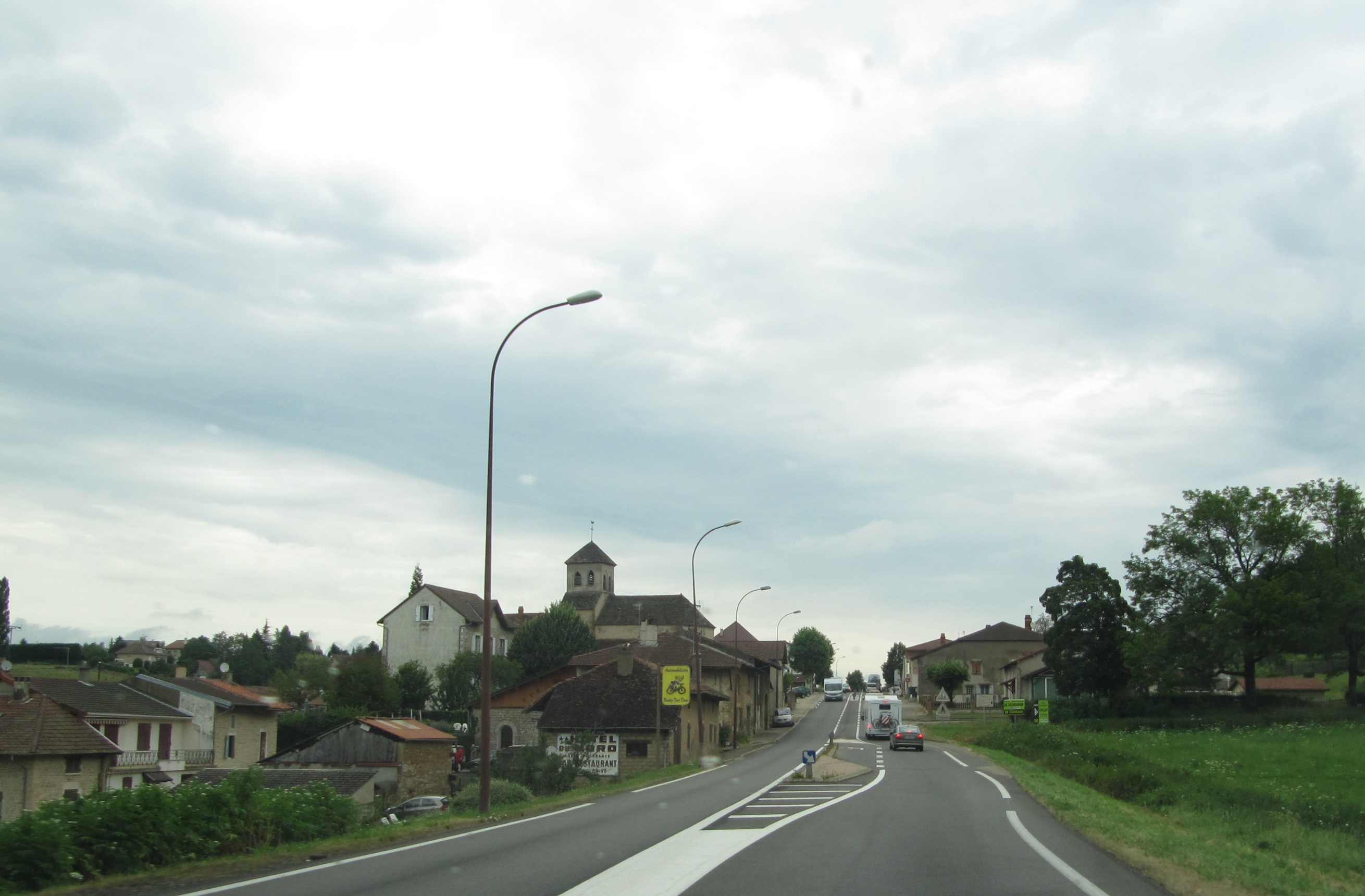
- A general view of Joudes, in 2012
- Location of Joudes
- Location within France Location within Bourgogne-Franche-Comté
- Coordinates: 46°28′07″N 5°21′34″E
- Country: France
- Region: Bourgogne-Franche-Comté
- Department: Saône-et-Loire
- Arrondissement: Louhans
- Canton: Cuiseaux
- Area^{1}: 11.16 km^{2} (4.31 sq mi)
- Elevation: 265 m (869 ft)
- Highest elevation: 441 m (1,447 ft)
- Lowest elevation: 199 m (653 ft)
- Population (2023): 352
  - Density: 31.5/km^{2} (81.7/sq mi)
- Time zone: UTC+01:00 (CET)
  - Summer (DST): UTC+02:00 (CEST)
- INSEE/Postal code: 71243 /71480
- ^{1} French Land Register data, which excludes lakes, ponds, glaciers > 1 km^{2} (0.386 sq mi or 247 acres) and river estuaries.

Joudes (French pronunciation: [ʒud]) is a commune in the Saône-et-Loire department in the region of Bourgogne-Franche-Comté in eastern France.

== See also ==
- Communes of the Saône-et-Loire department
