= Ratenelle =

- Commune
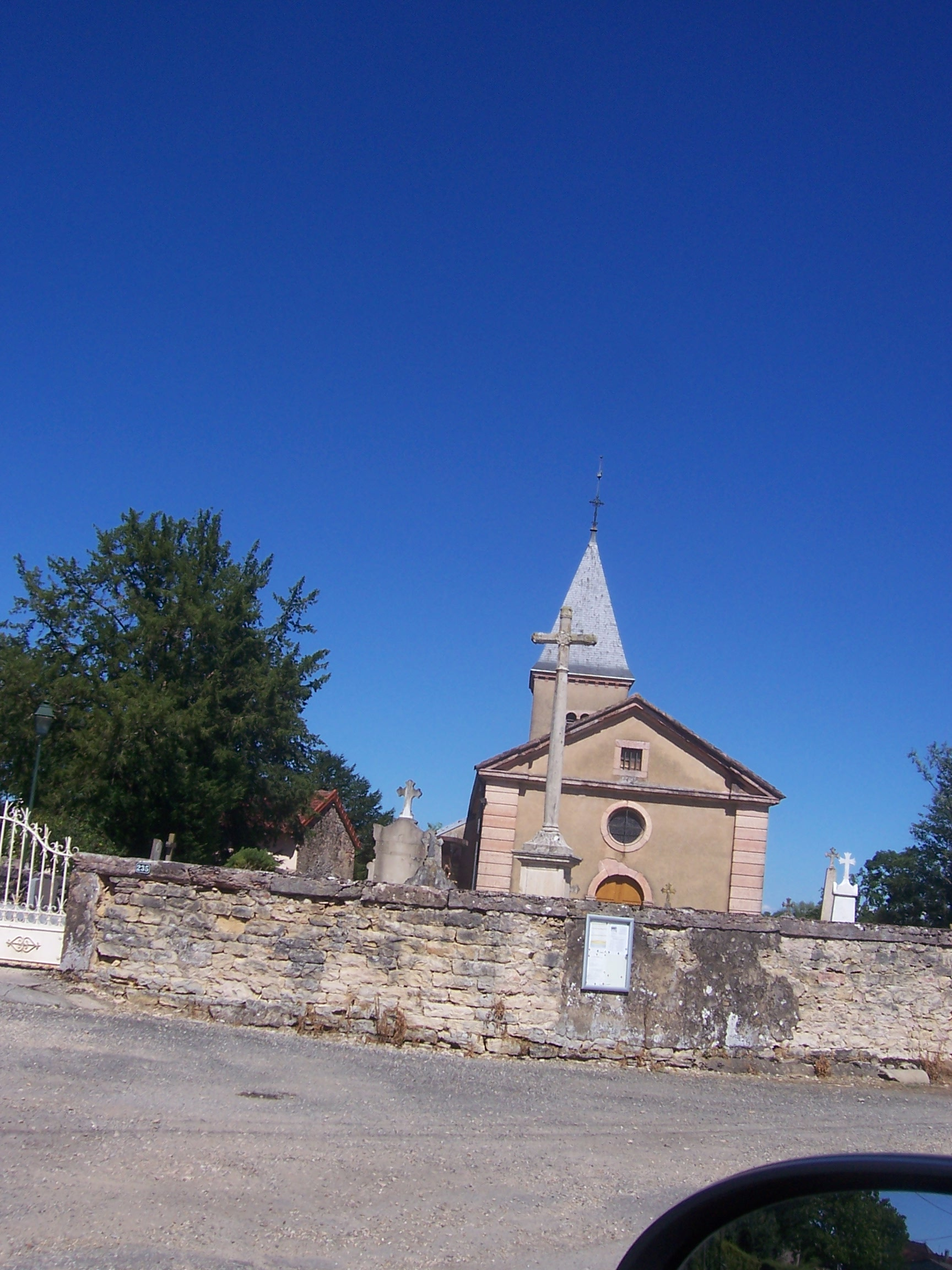
- The church in Ratenelle

- Coat of arms
- Location of Ratenelle
- Location within France Location within Bourgogne-Franche-Comté
- Coordinates: 46°31′40″N 5°01′01″E
- Country: France
- Region: Bourgogne-Franche-Comté
- Department: Saône-et-Loire
- Arrondissement: Louhans
- Canton: Cuiseaux

Government
  - Mayor (2021–2026): Patrick Lacoste
- Area^{1}: 8.03 km^{2} (3.10 sq mi)
- Elevation: 179 m (587 ft)
- Highest elevation: 196 m (643 ft)
- Lowest elevation: 171 m (561 ft)
- Population (2023): 363
  - Density: 45.2/km^{2} (117/sq mi)
- Time zone: UTC+01:00 (CET)
  - Summer (DST): UTC+02:00 (CEST)
- INSEE/Postal code: 71366 /71290
- ^{1} French Land Register data, which excludes lakes, ponds, glaciers > 1 km^{2} (0.386 sq mi or 247 acres) and river estuaries.

Ratenelle (French pronunciation: [ʁatnɛl]) is a commune in the Saône-et-Loire department in the region of Bourgogne-Franche-Comté in eastern France.

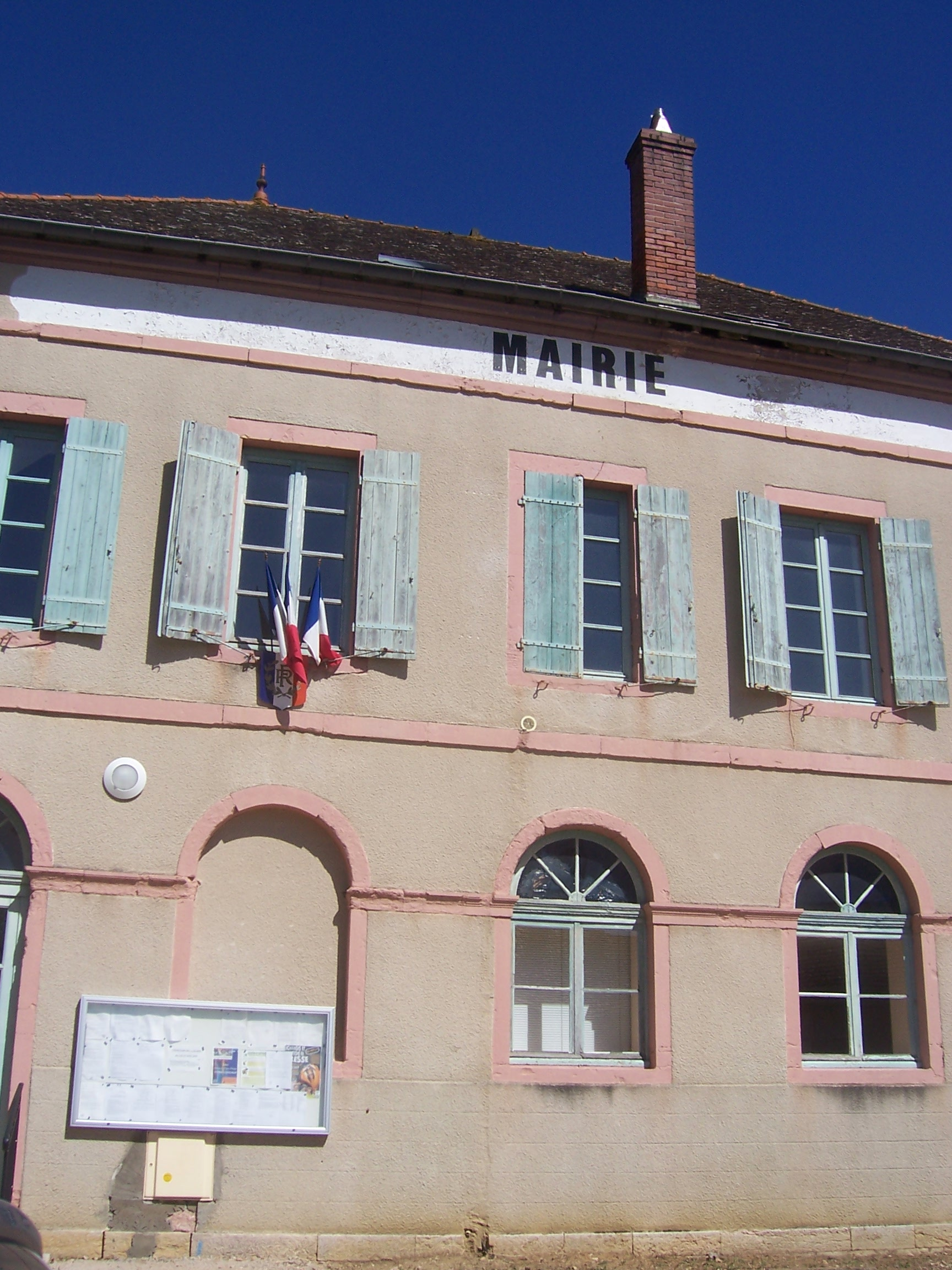
Town hall

== See also ==
- Communes of the Saône-et-Loire department
