= Canton of Cuiseaux =

Coordinates: 46.49°N 5.39°E

The canton of Cuiseaux is an administrative division of the Saône-et-Loire department, eastern France. Its borders were modified at the French canton reorganisation which came into effect in March 2015. Its seat is in Cuiseaux.

It consists of the following communes:

1. L'Abergement-de-Cuisery
2. Bantanges
3. Brienne
4. Champagnat
5. La Chapelle-Thècle
6. Condal
7. Cuiseaux
8. Cuisery
9. Dommartin-lès-Cuiseaux
10. Flacey-en-Bresse
11. La Frette
12. Frontenaud
13. La Genête
14. Huilly-sur-Seille
15. Joudes
16. Jouvençon
17. Loisy
18. Ménetreuil
19. Le Miroir
20. Montpont-en-Bresse
21. Ormes
22. Rancy
23. Ratenelle
24. Romenay
25. Sainte-Croix-en-Bresse
26. Savigny-sur-Seille
27. Simandre
28. Varennes-Saint-Sauveur
