= Savigny-sur-Seille =

- Commune
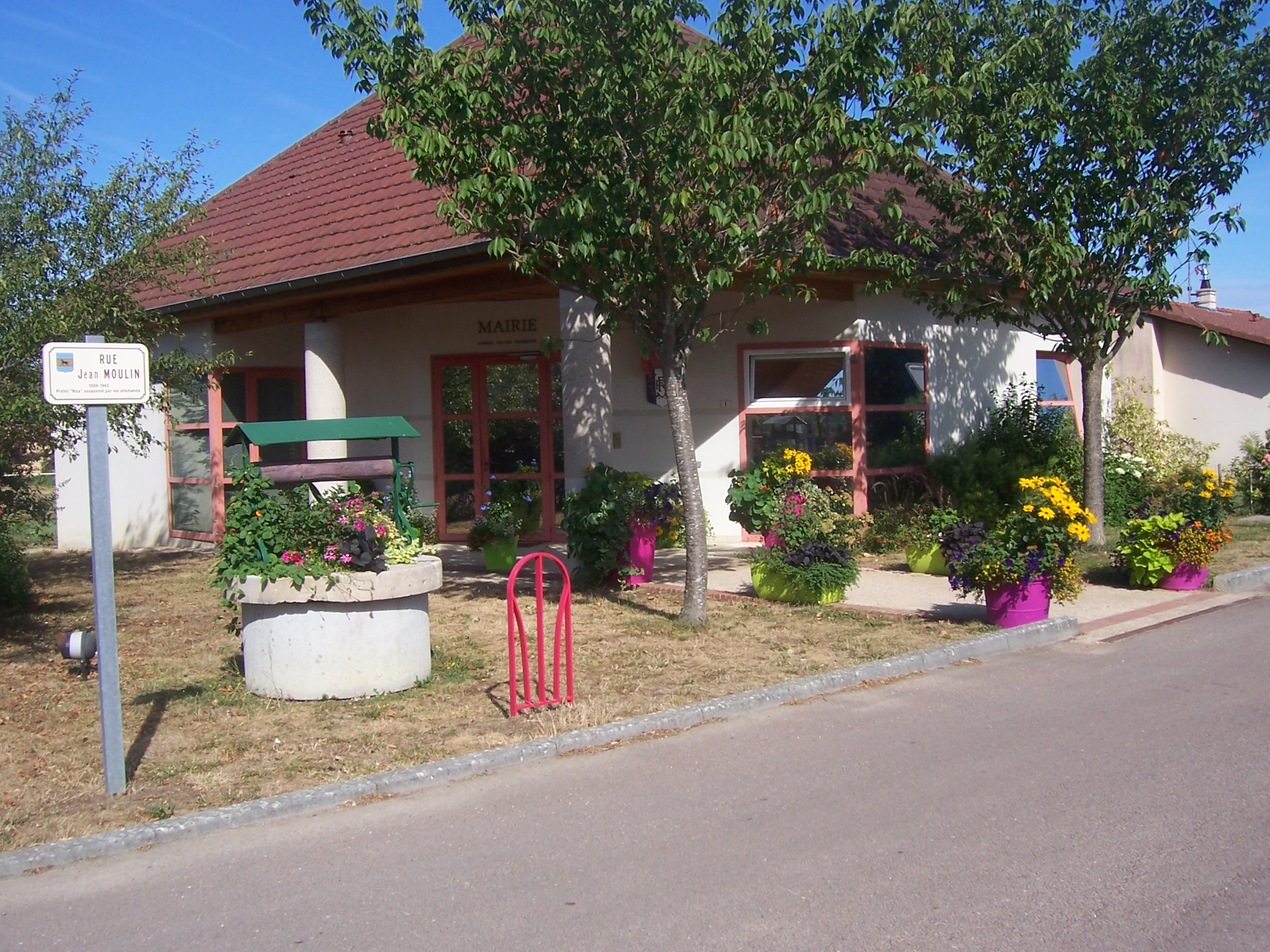
- Town hall

- Coat of arms
- Location of Savigny-sur-Seille
- Location within France Location within Bourgogne-Franche-Comté
- Coordinates: 46°37′29″N 5°06′29″E
- Country: France
- Region: Bourgogne-Franche-Comté
- Department: Saône-et-Loire
- Arrondissement: Louhans
- Canton: Cuiseaux
- Area^{1}: 14.48 km^{2} (5.59 sq mi)
- Elevation: 200 m (660 ft)
- Highest elevation: 207 m (679 ft)
- Lowest elevation: 174 m (571 ft)
- Population (2023): 385
  - Density: 26.6/km^{2} (68.9/sq mi)
- Time zone: UTC+01:00 (CET)
  - Summer (DST): UTC+02:00 (CEST)
- INSEE/Postal code: 71508 /71440
- ^{1} French Land Register data, which excludes lakes, ponds, glaciers > 1 km^{2} (0.386 sq mi or 247 acres) and river estuaries.

Savigny-sur-Seille (French pronunciation: [saviɲi syʁ sɛj], literally Savigny on Seille) is a commune in the Saône-et-Loire department in the region of Bourgogne-Franche-Comté in eastern France.

== See also ==
- Communes of the Saône-et-Loire department
