= L'Abergement-de-Cuisery =

- Commune
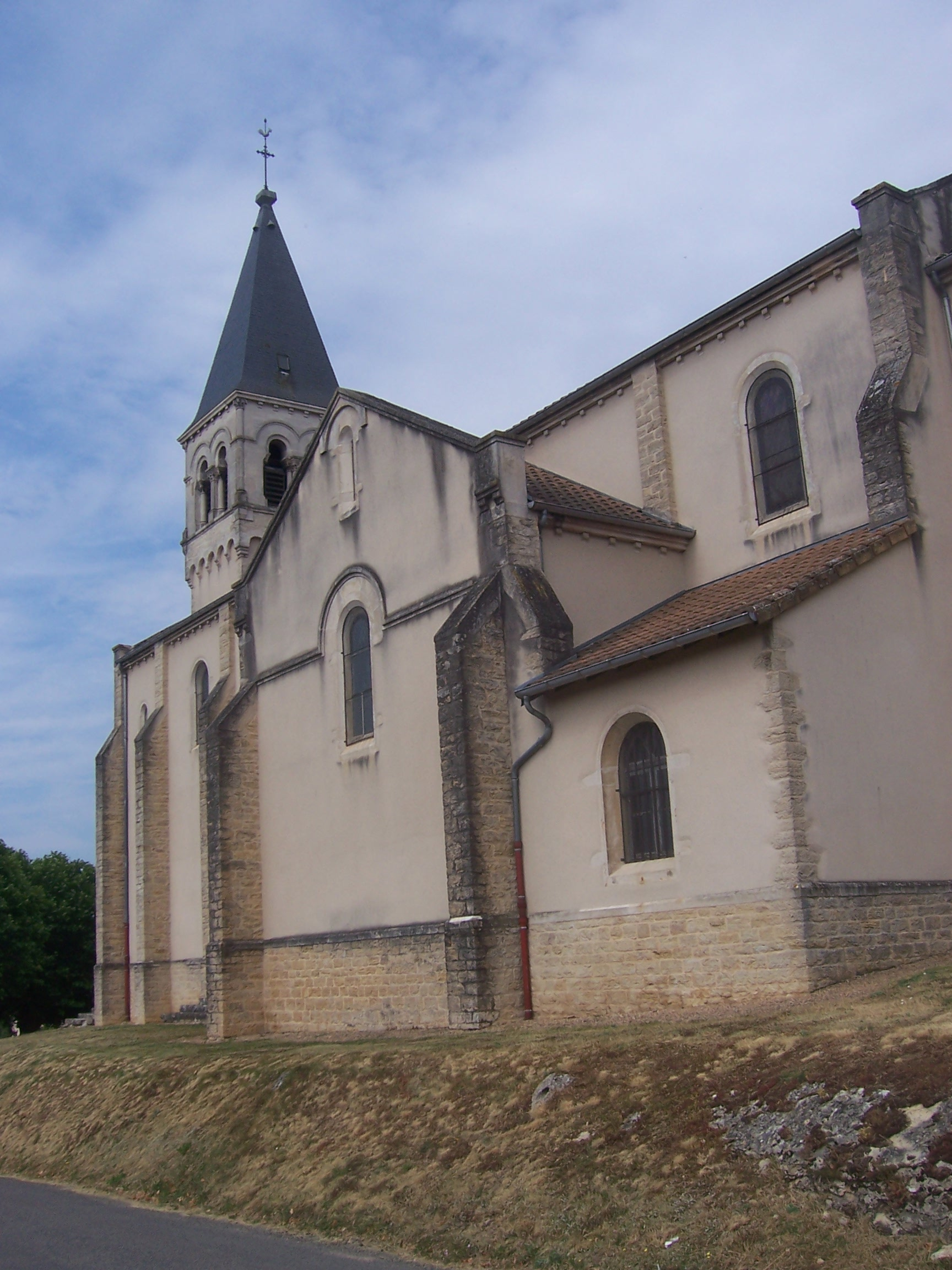
- Location of L'Abergement-de-Cuisery
- Location within France Location within Bourgogne-Franche-Comté
- Coordinates: 46°34′44″N 4°57′39″E
- Country: France
- Region: Bourgogne-Franche-Comté
- Department: Saône-et-Loire
- Arrondissement: Louhans
- Canton: Cuiseaux
- Intercommunality: Terres de Bresse

Government
  - Mayor (2020–2026): Thierry Colin
- Area^{1}: 7.96 km^{2} (3.07 sq mi)
- Elevation: 350 m (1,150 ft)
- Highest elevation: 212 m (696 ft)
- Lowest elevation: 171 m (561 ft)
- Population (2023): 810
  - Density: 100/km^{2} (260/sq mi)
- Time zone: UTC+01:00 (CET)
  - Summer (DST): UTC+02:00 (CEST)
- INSEE/Postal code: 71001 /71290
- ^{1} French Land Register data, which excludes lakes, ponds, glaciers > 1 km^{2} (0.386 sq mi or 247 acres) and river estuaries.

L'Abergement-de-Cuisery (French pronunciation: [labɛʁʒəmɑ̃ də kɥizʁi]) is a commune in the Saône-et-Loire department in Bourgogne-Franche-Comté in eastern France.

== Geography ==
The commune lies in the south of the department in the Saône valley, across the Saône from Mâcon, the prefecture of the department.

== Population ==
Historical population
Year	Pop.	±% p.a.
1968	609	—
1975	590	−0.45%
1982	584	−0.15%
1990	652	+1.39%
1999	640	−0.21%
2007	702	+1.16%
2012	753	+1.41%
2017	797	+1.14%
2023	810	+0.27%
Source: INSEE

== See also ==
- Communes of the Saône-et-Loire department
