= Rancy =

- Commune
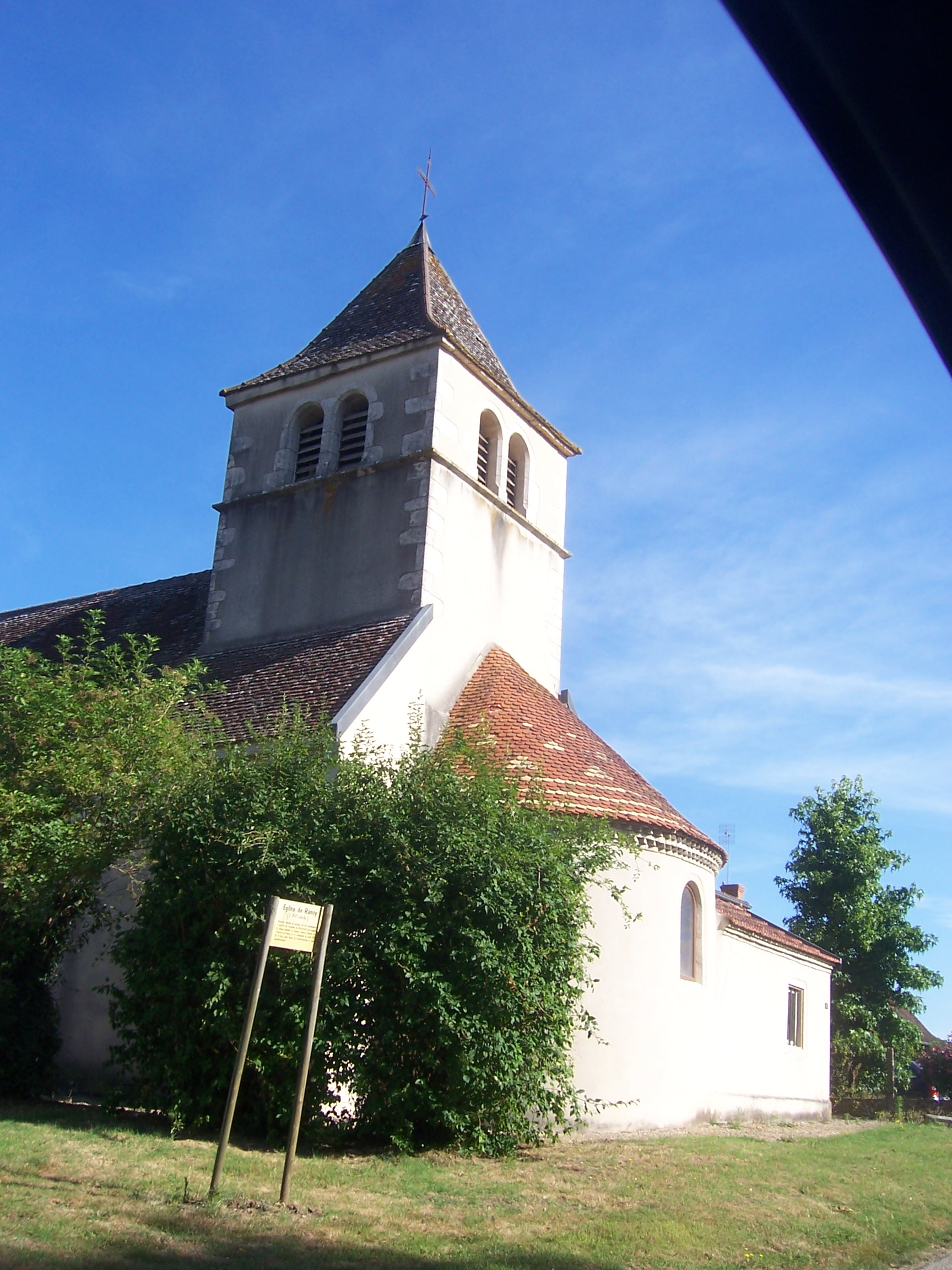
- The church in Rancy
- Location of Rancy
- Location within France Location within Bourgogne-Franche-Comté
- Coordinates: 46°35′55″N 5°05′36″E
- Country: France
- Region: Bourgogne-Franche-Comté
- Department: Saône-et-Loire
- Arrondissement: Louhans
- Canton: Cuiseaux
- Area^{1}: 5.76 km^{2} (2.22 sq mi)
- Elevation: 190 m (620 ft)
- Highest elevation: 199 m (653 ft)
- Lowest elevation: 176 m (577 ft)
- Population (2023): 616
  - Density: 107/km^{2} (277/sq mi)
- Time zone: UTC+01:00 (CET)
  - Summer (DST): UTC+02:00 (CEST)
- INSEE/Postal code: 71365 /71290
- ^{1} French Land Register data, which excludes lakes, ponds, glaciers > 1 km^{2} (0.386 sq mi or 247 acres) and river estuaries.

Rancy (French pronunciation: [ʁɑ̃si]) is a commune in the Saône-et-Loire department in the region of Bourgogne-Franche-Comté in eastern France.

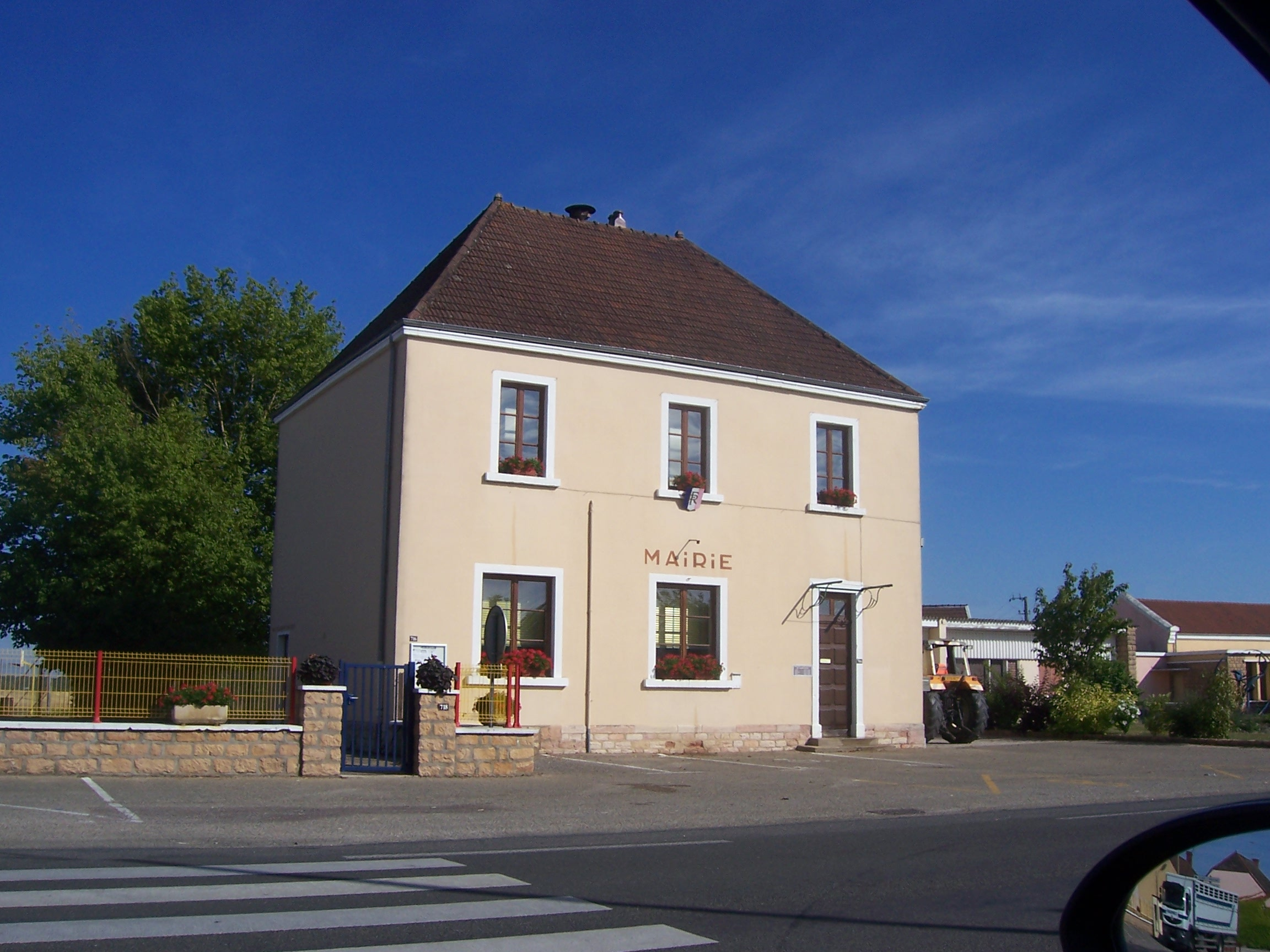
Town hall

== See also ==
- Communes of the Saône-et-Loire department
