= Champagnat, Saône-et-Loire =

Champagnat
- Commune
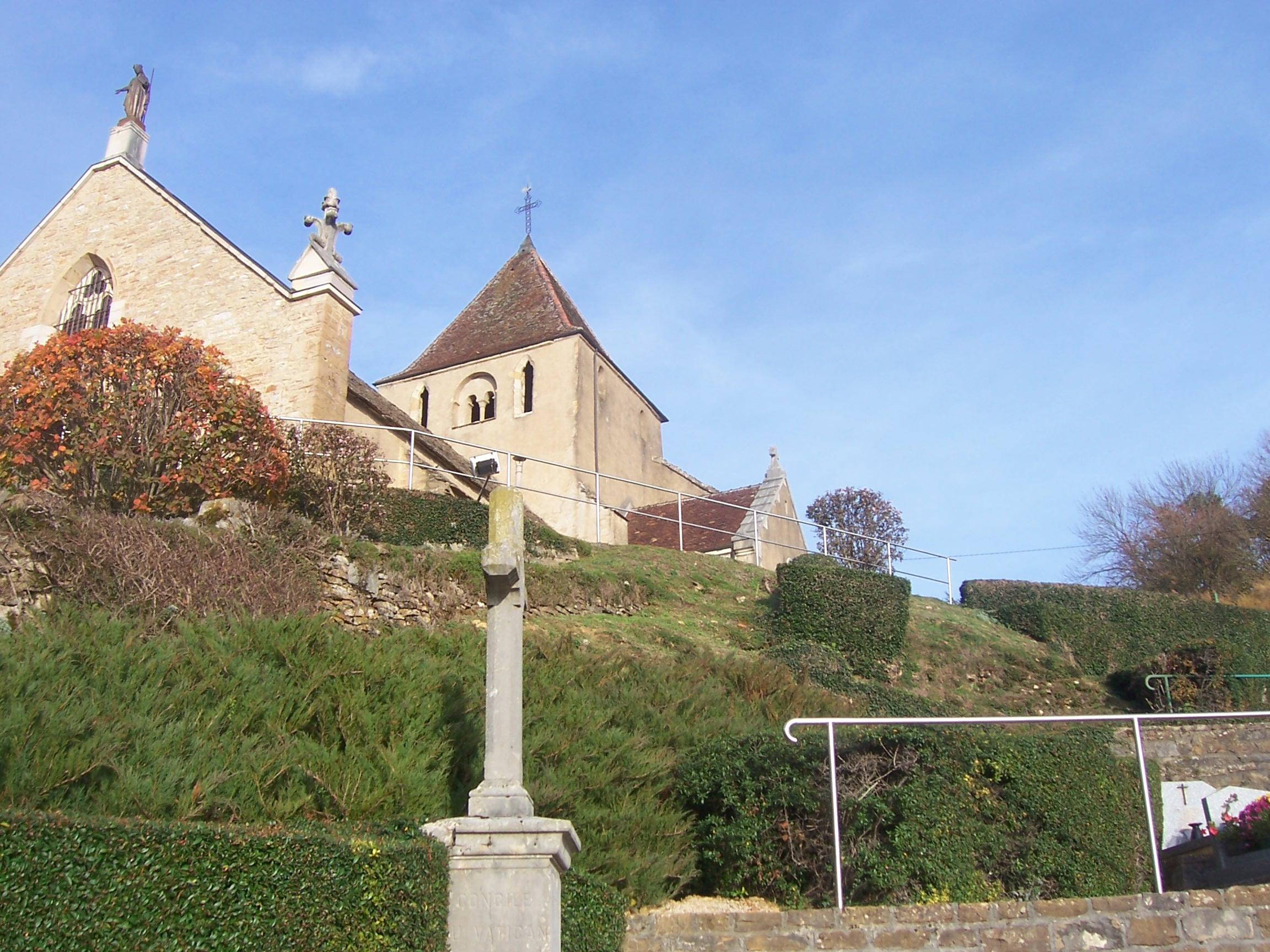
- The church in Champagnat

- Coat of arms
- Location of Champagnat
- Location within France Location within Bourgogne-Franche-Comté
- Coordinates: 46°29′00″N 5°22′53″E
- Country: France
- Region: Bourgogne-Franche-Comté
- Department: Saône-et-Loire
- Arrondissement: Louhans
- Canton: Cuiseaux

Government
  - Mayor (2023–2026): Fabienne Buisson
- Area^{1}: 13.18 km^{2} (5.09 sq mi)
- Elevation: 412 m (1,352 ft)
- Highest elevation: 611 m (2,005 ft)
- Lowest elevation: 196 m (643 ft)
- Population (2023): 460
  - Density: 35/km^{2} (90/sq mi)
- Time zone: UTC+01:00 (CET)
  - Summer (DST): UTC+02:00 (CEST)
- INSEE/Postal code: 71079 /71480
- ^{1} French Land Register data, which excludes lakes, ponds, glaciers > 1 km^{2} (0.386 sq mi or 247 acres) and river estuaries.

Champagnat (French pronunciation: [ʃɑ̃paɲa]) is a commune in the Saône-et-Loire department in the region of Bourgogne-Franche-Comté in eastern France.

== See also ==
- Communes of the Saône-et-Loire department
