= Romenay pepper =

- Species: Capsicum annuum
- Origin: Romenay, France
- Heat: Low
- Scoville scale: 2,000 SHU

The Romenay pepper (French: piment de Romenay) or Bresse pepper (piment de Bresse) is a variety of Capsicum annuum originating from the village of Romenay, about thirty kilometers northeast of Mâcon. It is cultivated around the French historical province of Bresse.

Rounder and shorter than the Espelette pepper, it is considered to be slightly milder yet has the same rating of 4/10 on the simplified Scoville scale (1500 to 2500 on the classic scale).

It appears to have been cultivated since the 16th century, but its origins remain uncertain. One hypothesis is that it was brought by the Spanish to neighboring Franche-Comté. It was popular in the region until the 1950s, where it was used in powder form with charcuterie, stews, and in a strong local cheese, the Pourri bressan, before falling into oblivion. It has seen a resurgence of interest and local cultivation since the 2010s.
