= Ormes, Saône-et-Loire =

Ormes
- Commune
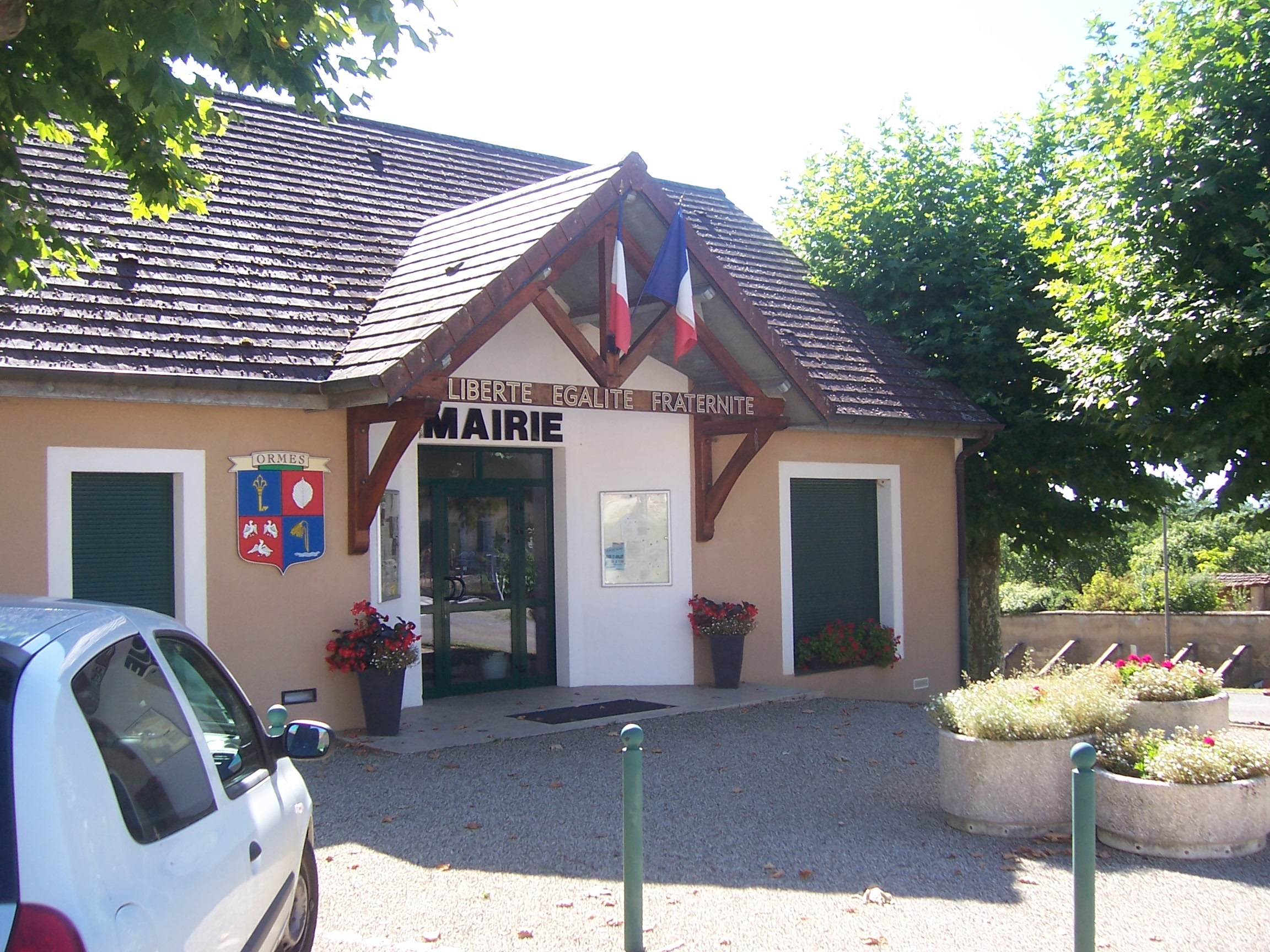
- Town hall

- Coat of arms
- Location of Ormes
- Location within France Location within Bourgogne-Franche-Comté
- Coordinates: 46°38′02″N 4°57′55″E
- Country: France
- Region: Bourgogne-Franche-Comté
- Department: Saône-et-Loire
- Arrondissement: Louhans
- Canton: Cuiseaux
- Area^{1}: 9.8 km^{2} (3.8 sq mi)
- Elevation: 200 m (660 ft)
- Highest elevation: 214 m (702 ft)
- Lowest elevation: 167 m (548 ft)
- Population (2023): 507
  - Density: 52/km^{2} (130/sq mi)
- Time zone: UTC+01:00 (CET)
  - Summer (DST): UTC+02:00 (CEST)
- INSEE/Postal code: 71332 /71290
- ^{1} French Land Register data, which excludes lakes, ponds, glaciers > 1 km^{2} (0.386 sq mi or 247 acres) and river estuaries.

Ormes (French pronunciation: [ɔʁm]) is a commune in the Saône-et-Loire department in the region of Bourgogne-Franche-Comté in eastern France.

== See also ==
- Communes of the Saône-et-Loire department
