= Loisy, Saône-et-Loire =

Loisy
- Commune
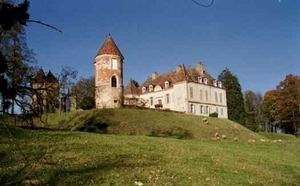
- Chateau

- Coat of arms
- Location of Loisy
- Location within France Location within Bourgogne-Franche-Comté
- Coordinates: 46°34′57″N 5°01′43″E
- Country: France
- Region: Bourgogne-Franche-Comté
- Department: Saône-et-Loire
- Arrondissement: Louhans
- Canton: Cuiseaux
- Area^{1}: 14.64 km^{2} (5.65 sq mi)
- Elevation: 212 m (696 ft)
- Highest elevation: 217 m (712 ft)
- Lowest elevation: 172 m (564 ft)
- Population (2023): 693
  - Density: 47.3/km^{2} (123/sq mi)
- Time zone: UTC+01:00 (CET)
  - Summer (DST): UTC+02:00 (CEST)
- INSEE/Postal code: 71261 /71290
- ^{1} French Land Register data, which excludes lakes, ponds, glaciers > 1 km^{2} (0.386 sq mi or 247 acres) and river estuaries.

Loisy (French pronunciation: [lwazi]) is a commune in the Saône-et-Loire department in the region of Bourgogne-Franche-Comté in eastern France.

== See also ==
- Communes of the Saône-et-Loire department
