= Cuiseaux =

- Commune
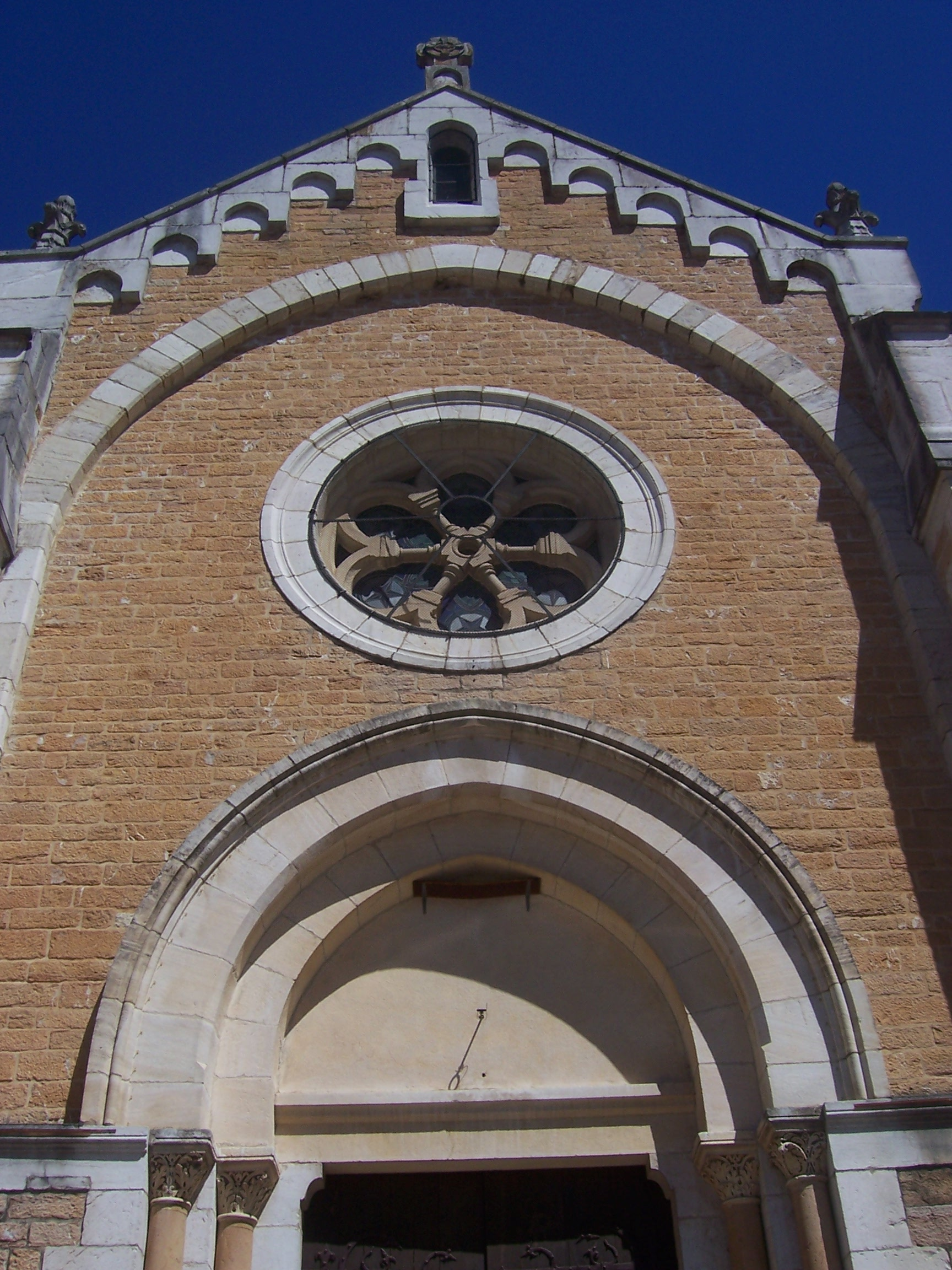
- The church in Cuiseaux

- Coat of arms
- Location of Cuiseaux
- Location within France Location within Bourgogne-Franche-Comté
- Coordinates: 46°29′41″N 5°23′19″E
- Country: France
- Region: Bourgogne-Franche-Comté
- Department: Saône-et-Loire
- Arrondissement: Louhans
- Canton: Cuiseaux

Government
  - Mayor (2022–2026): Françoise Jaillet
- Area^{1}: 21.26 km^{2} (8.21 sq mi)
- Elevation: 246 m (807 ft)
- Highest elevation: 647 m (2,123 ft)
- Lowest elevation: 188 m (617 ft)
- Population (2023): 1,869
  - Density: 87.91/km^{2} (227.7/sq mi)
- Time zone: UTC+01:00 (CET)
  - Summer (DST): UTC+02:00 (CEST)
- INSEE/Postal code: 71157 /71480
- ^{1} French Land Register data, which excludes lakes, ponds, glaciers > 1 km^{2} (0.386 sq mi or 247 acres) and river estuaries.

Cuiseaux (French pronunciation: [kɥizo]) is a commune in the Saône-et-Loire department in the region of Bourgogne-Franche-Comté in eastern France.

== Geography ==
Cuiseaux is in the far southeastern corner of the department of Saône-et-Loire on the edge of the plain of Bresse at the foot of the first plateau of the Jura Mountains.

== Gallery ==
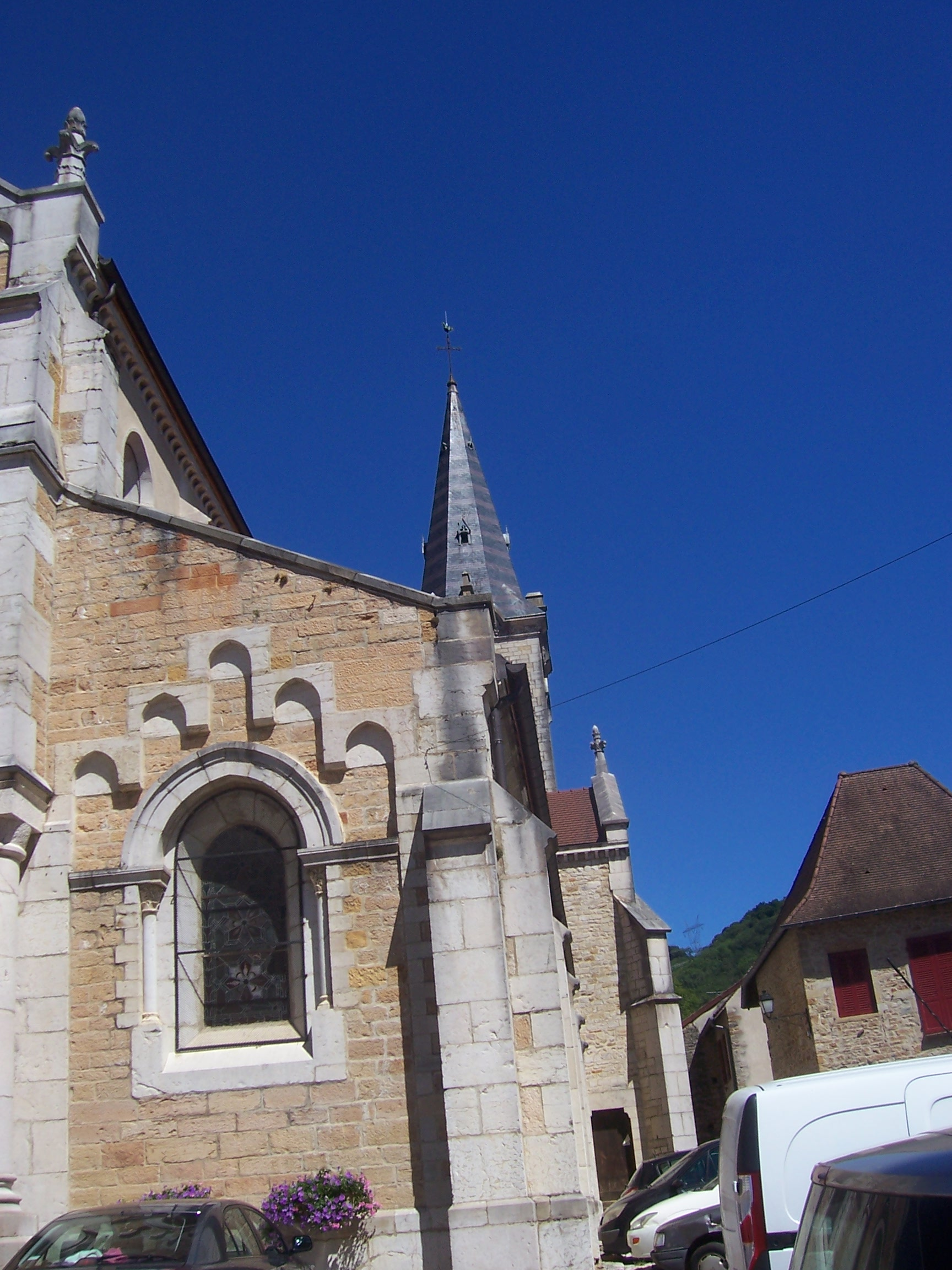
Spire of the church

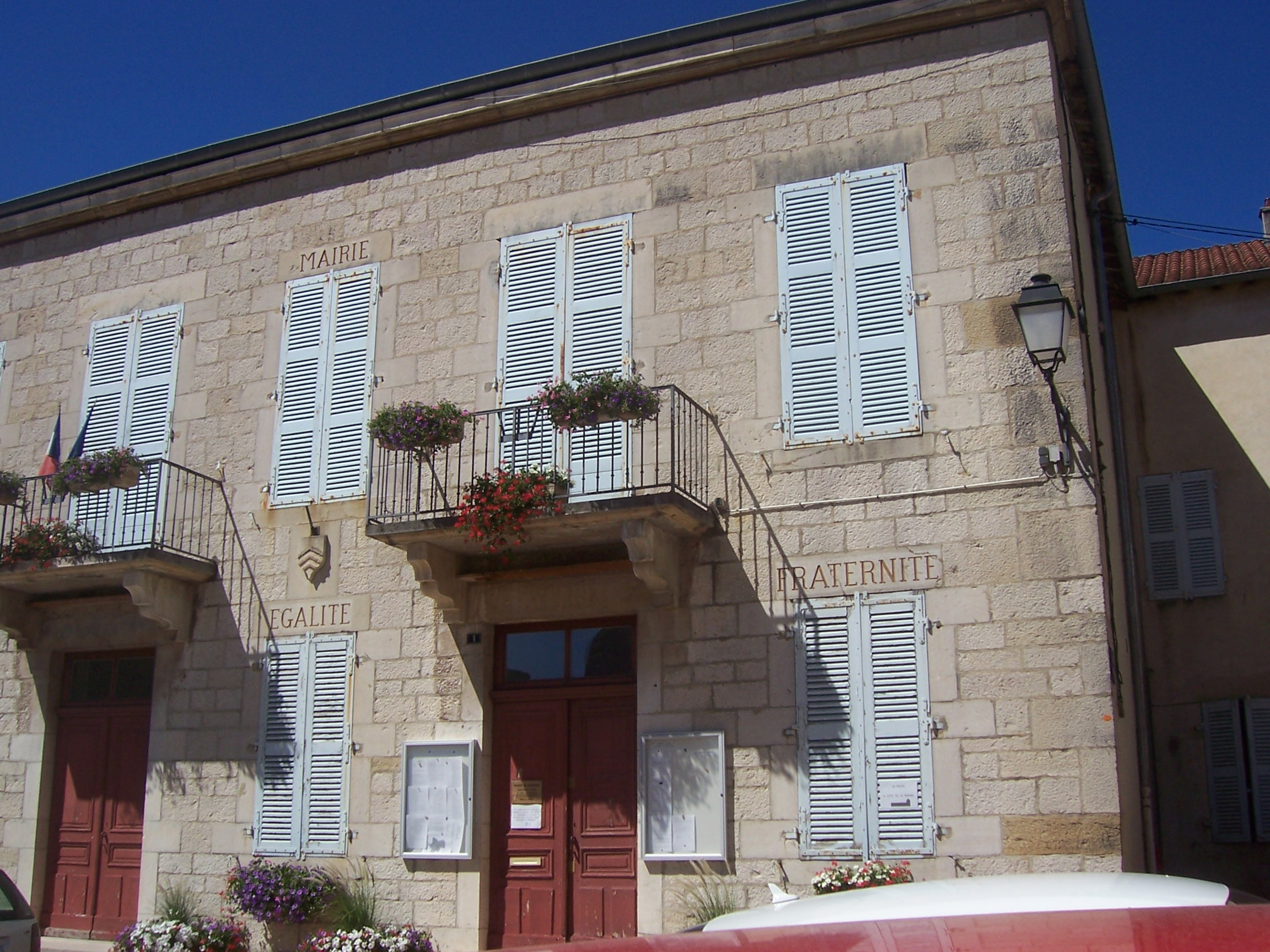
Town hall

== See also ==
- Communes of the Saône-et-Loire department
