= La Frette, Saône-et-Loire =

La Frette
- Commune
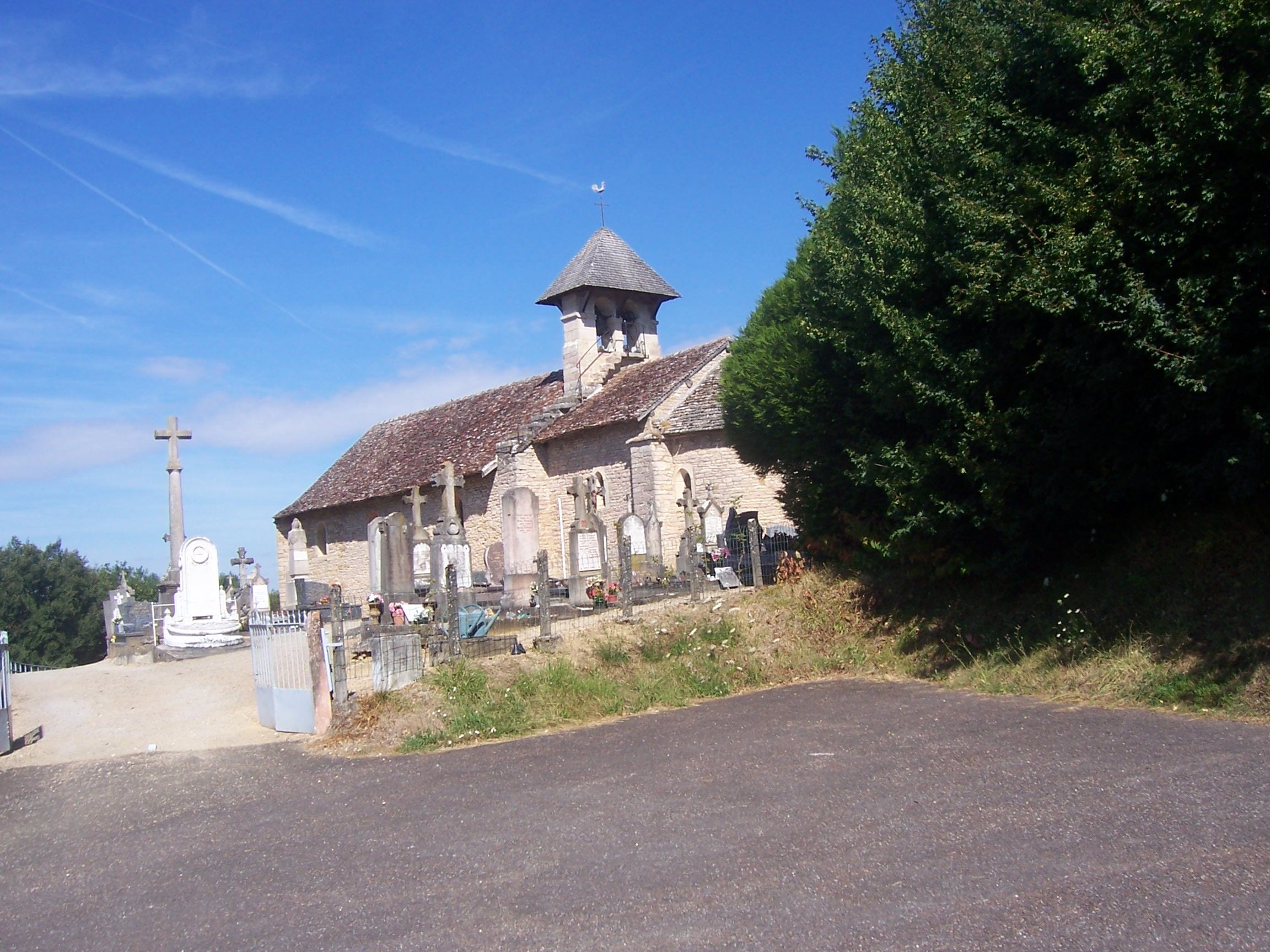
- The church in La Frette
- Location of La Frette
- Location within France Location within Bourgogne-Franche-Comté
- Coordinates: 46°38′23″N 5°03′03″E
- Country: France
- Region: Bourgogne-Franche-Comté
- Department: Saône-et-Loire
- Arrondissement: Louhans
- Canton: Cuiseaux
- Area^{1}: 11.22 km^{2} (4.33 sq mi)
- Elevation: 190 m (620 ft)
- Highest elevation: 213 m (699 ft)
- Lowest elevation: 179 m (587 ft)
- Population (2023): 258
  - Density: 23.0/km^{2} (59.6/sq mi)
- Time zone: UTC+01:00 (CET)
  - Summer (DST): UTC+02:00 (CEST)
- INSEE/Postal code: 71206 /71440
- ^{1} French Land Register data, which excludes lakes, ponds, glaciers > 1 km^{2} (0.386 sq mi or 247 acres) and river estuaries.

La Frette (French pronunciation: [la fʁɛt]) is a commune in the Saône-et-Loire department in the region of Bourgogne-Franche-Comté in eastern France.

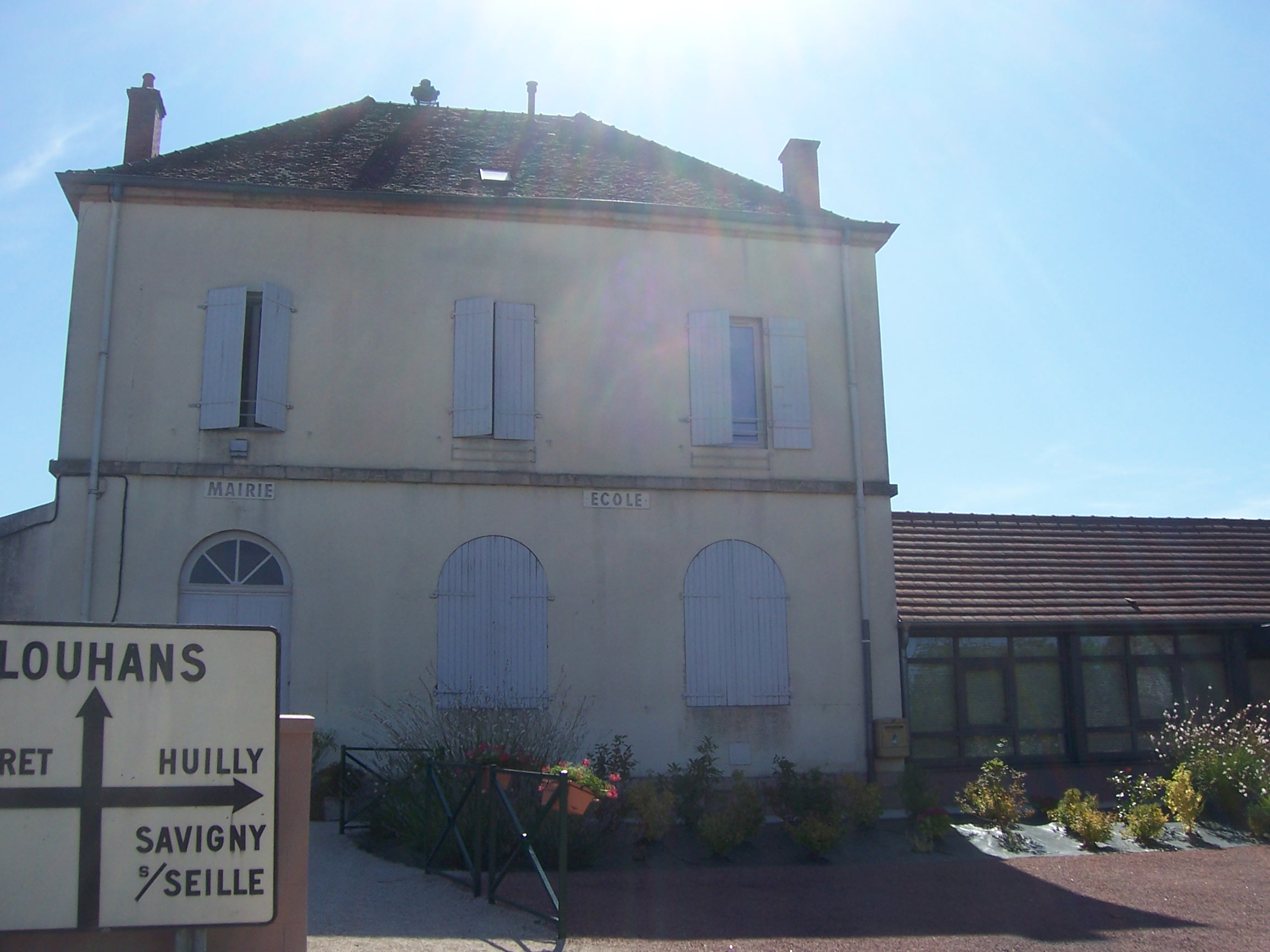
Town hall

== See also ==
- Communes of the Saône-et-Loire department
