= Le Miroir, Saône-et-Loire =

Le Miroir
- Commune
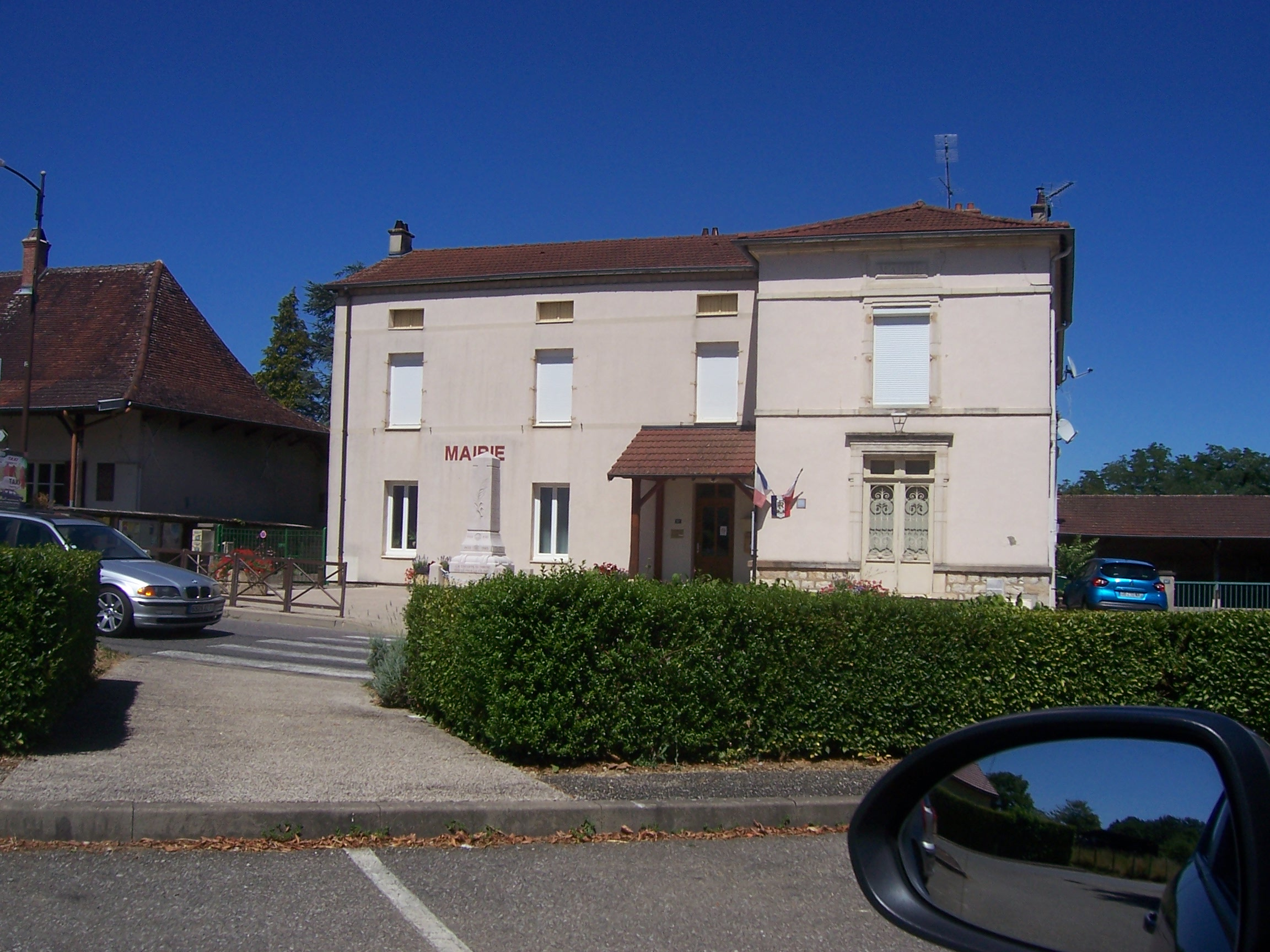
- Town hall
- Location of Le Miroir
- Location within France Location within Bourgogne-Franche-Comté
- Coordinates: 46°32′13″N 5°20′06″E
- Country: France
- Region: Bourgogne-Franche-Comté
- Department: Saône-et-Loire
- Arrondissement: Louhans
- Canton: Cuiseaux

Government
  - Mayor (2020–2026): Philippe Cauzard
- Area^{1}: 18.48 km^{2} (7.14 sq mi)
- Elevation: 212 m (696 ft)
- Highest elevation: 226 m (741 ft)
- Lowest elevation: 187 m (614 ft)
- Population (2023): 577
  - Density: 31.2/km^{2} (80.9/sq mi)
- Time zone: UTC+01:00 (CET)
  - Summer (DST): UTC+02:00 (CEST)
- INSEE/Postal code: 71300 /71480
- ^{1} French Land Register data, which excludes lakes, ponds, glaciers > 1 km^{2} (0.386 sq mi or 247 acres) and river estuaries.

Le Miroir (French pronunciation: [lə miʁwaʁ]) is a commune in the Saône-et-Loire department in the region of Bourgogne-Franche-Comté in eastern France.

== See also ==
- Communes of the Saône-et-Loire department
