= Bantanges =

- Commune
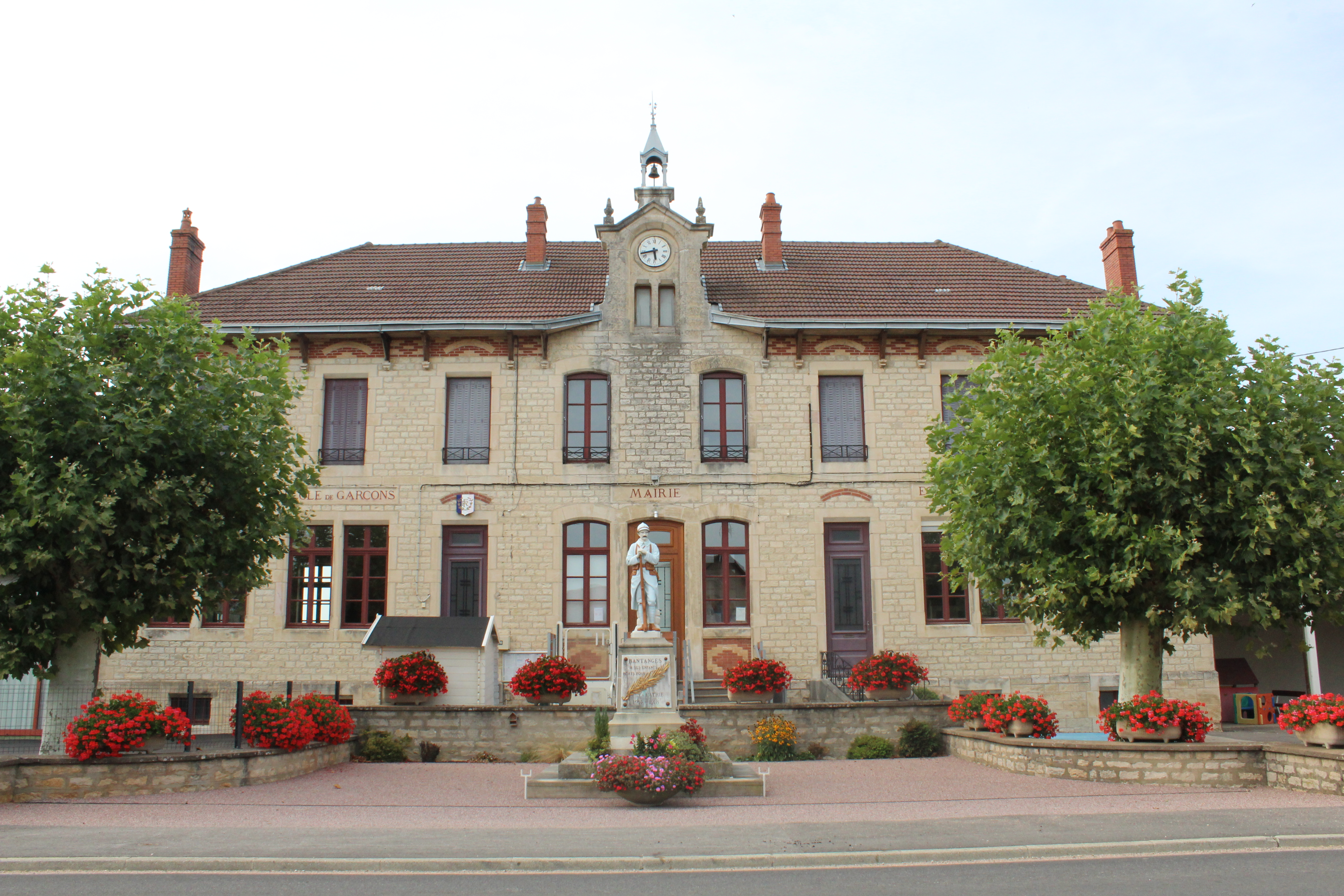
- Town hall
- Location of Bantanges
- Location within France Location within Bourgogne-Franche-Comté
- Coordinates: 46°36′37″N 5°06′45″E
- Country: France
- Region: Bourgogne-Franche-Comté
- Department: Saône-et-Loire
- Arrondissement: Louhans
- Canton: Cuiseaux

Government
  - Mayor (2020–2026): Jean-Michel Reboulet
- Area^{1}: 10.73 km^{2} (4.14 sq mi)
- Elevation: 200 m (660 ft)
- Highest elevation: 201 m (659 ft)
- Lowest elevation: 175 m (574 ft)
- Population (2023): 577
  - Density: 53.8/km^{2} (139/sq mi)
- Time zone: UTC+01:00 (CET)
  - Summer (DST): UTC+02:00 (CEST)
- INSEE/Postal code: 71018 /71500
- ^{1} French Land Register data, which excludes lakes, ponds, glaciers > 1 km^{2} (0.386 sq mi or 247 acres) and river estuaries.

Bantanges (French pronunciation: [bɑ̃tɑ̃ʒ]) is a commune in the Saône-et-Loire department in the region of Bourgogne-Franche-Comté in eastern France.

== Geography ==
The commune lies on the plain of Bresse in the east of the department.

The Seille forms the commune's northwestern border. The Sâne Morte forms most of the commune's southeastern border.

== Population ==
Historical population
Year	Pop.	±% p.a.
1968	647	—
1975	574	−1.70%
1982	552	−0.56%
1990	477	−1.81%
1999	446	−0.74%
2007	561	+2.91%
2012	555	−0.21%
2017	549	−0.22%
2023	577	+0.83%
Source: INSEE

== See also ==
- Communes of the Saône-et-Loire department
