= La Genête =

- Commune
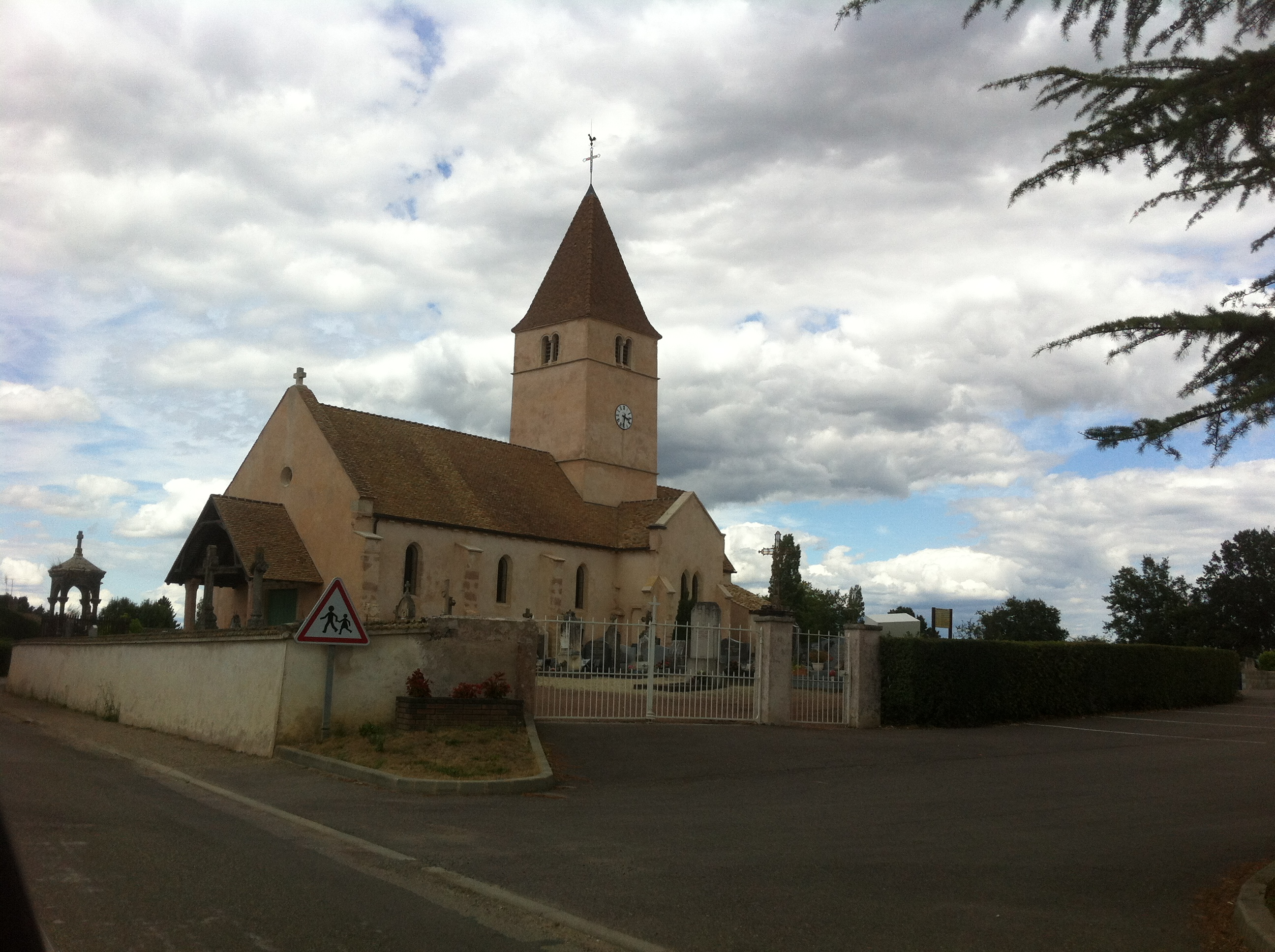
- The church in La Genête
- Location of La Genête
- Location within France Location within Bourgogne-Franche-Comté
- Coordinates: 46°33′07″N 5°02′45″E
- Country: France
- Region: Bourgogne-Franche-Comté
- Department: Saône-et-Loire
- Arrondissement: Louhans
- Canton: Cuiseaux

Government
  - Mayor (2024–2026): Chantal Simonnet
- Area^{1}: 11.57 km^{2} (4.47 sq mi)
- Elevation: 196 m (643 ft)
- Highest elevation: 200 m (660 ft)
- Lowest elevation: 172 m (564 ft)
- Population (2023): 570
  - Density: 49/km^{2} (130/sq mi)
- Time zone: UTC+01:00 (CET)
  - Summer (DST): UTC+02:00 (CEST)
- INSEE/Postal code: 71213 /71290
- ^{1} French Land Register data, which excludes lakes, ponds, glaciers > 1 km^{2} (0.386 sq mi or 247 acres) and river estuaries.

La Genête (French pronunciation: [la ʒənɛt]) is a commune in the Saône-et-Loire department in the region of Bourgogne-Franche-Comté in eastern France.

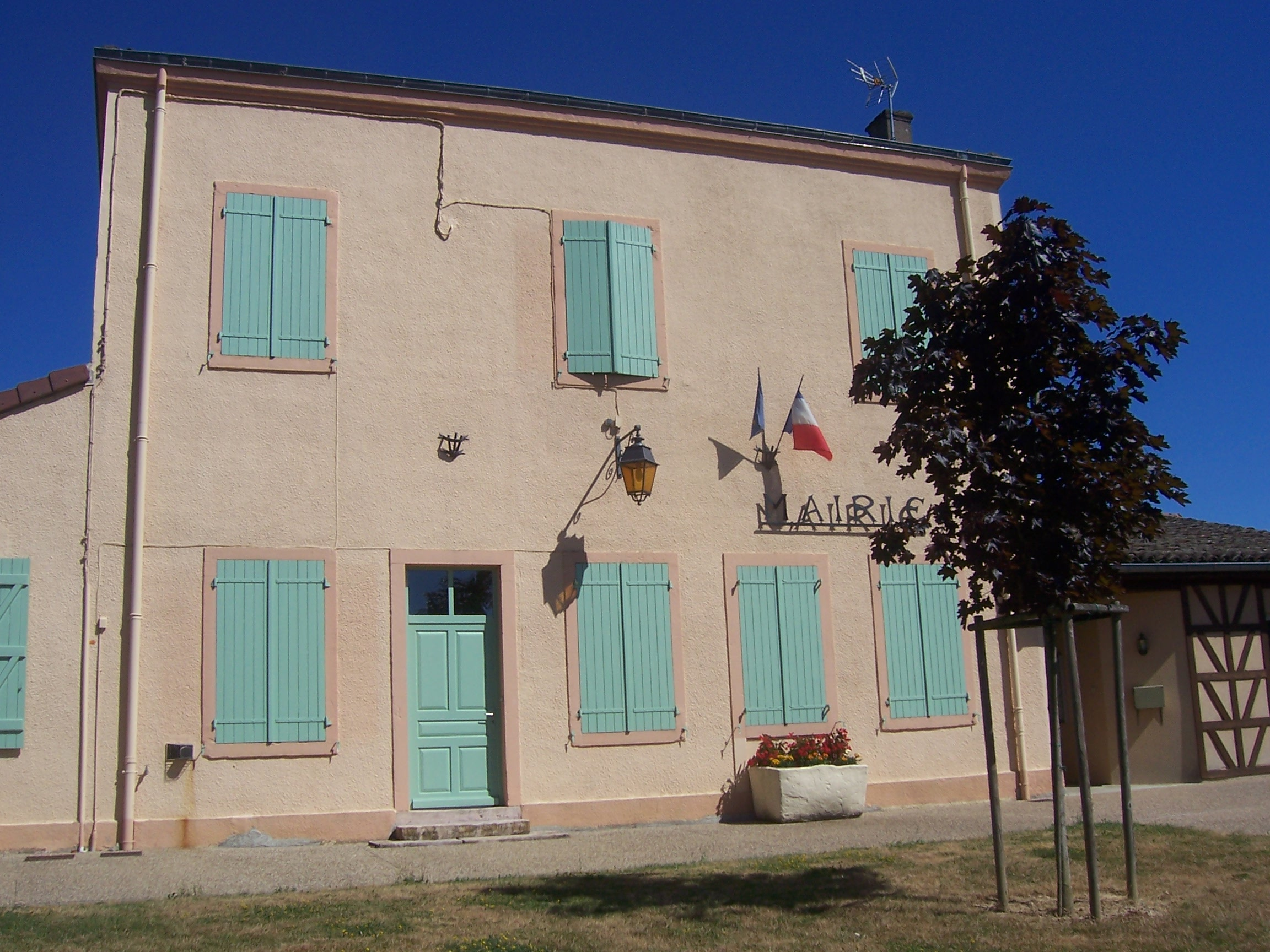
Town hall

== Geography ==
The Sâne Vive forms most of the commune's northern and northwestern borders, then flows into the Seille, which forms its western border.

== See also ==
- Communes of the Saône-et-Loire department
