= Sâne Morte =

River in eastern France

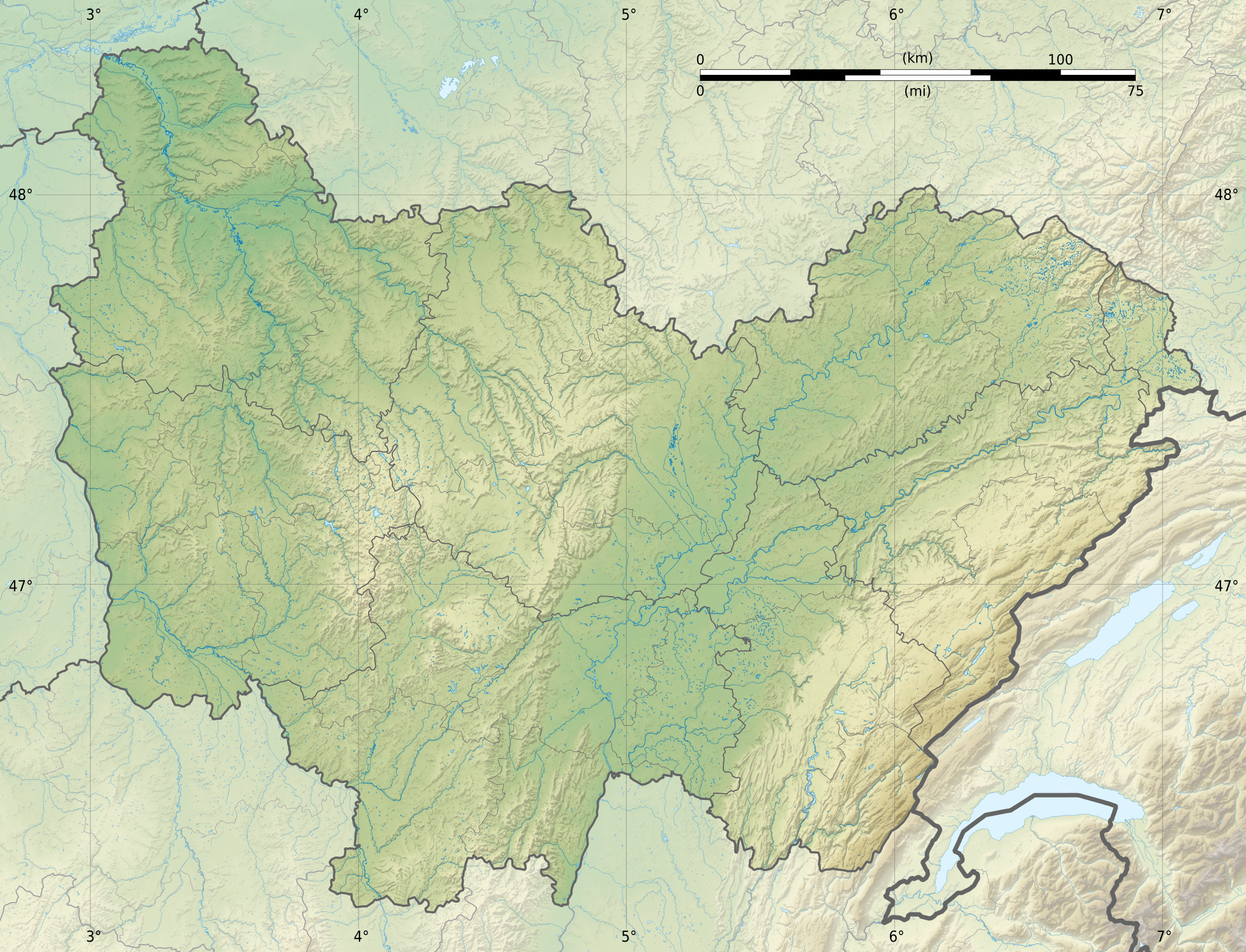
- Location within France Location within Bourgogne-Franche-Comté

Location
- Country: France

Physical characteristics
- Source
  - location: Foissiat
  - coordinates: 46°22′32″N 05°11′22″E
  - elevation: 220 m (720 ft)
- Mouth
  - location: Sâne Vive
  - coordinates: 46°34′30″N 05°05′38″E
  - elevation: 175 m (574 ft)
- Length: 54.6 km (33.9 mi)

Basin features
- Progression: Sâne Vive→ Seille→ Saône→ Rhône→ Mediterranean Sea

The Sâne Morte (French: la Sâne Morte, the dead Sâne) is a 54.6-kilometre (33.9 mi) long river in the Ain and Saône-et-Loire départements, eastern France. Its source is at Foissiat. It flows generally north-northwest. It is a right tributary of the Sâne Vive into which it flows at Ménetreuil.

== Départements and communes along its course ==
This list is ordered from source to mouth:

- Ain: Foissiat, Lescheroux, Cormoz, Saint-Nizier-le-Bouchoux,
- Saône-et-Loire: Varennes-Saint-Sauveur,
- Ain: Curciat-Dongalon,
- Saône-et-Loire: Montpont-en-Bresse, Sainte-Croix, La Chapelle-Naude, Sornay, Bantanges, Ménetreuil,
