= Jouvençon =

- Commune
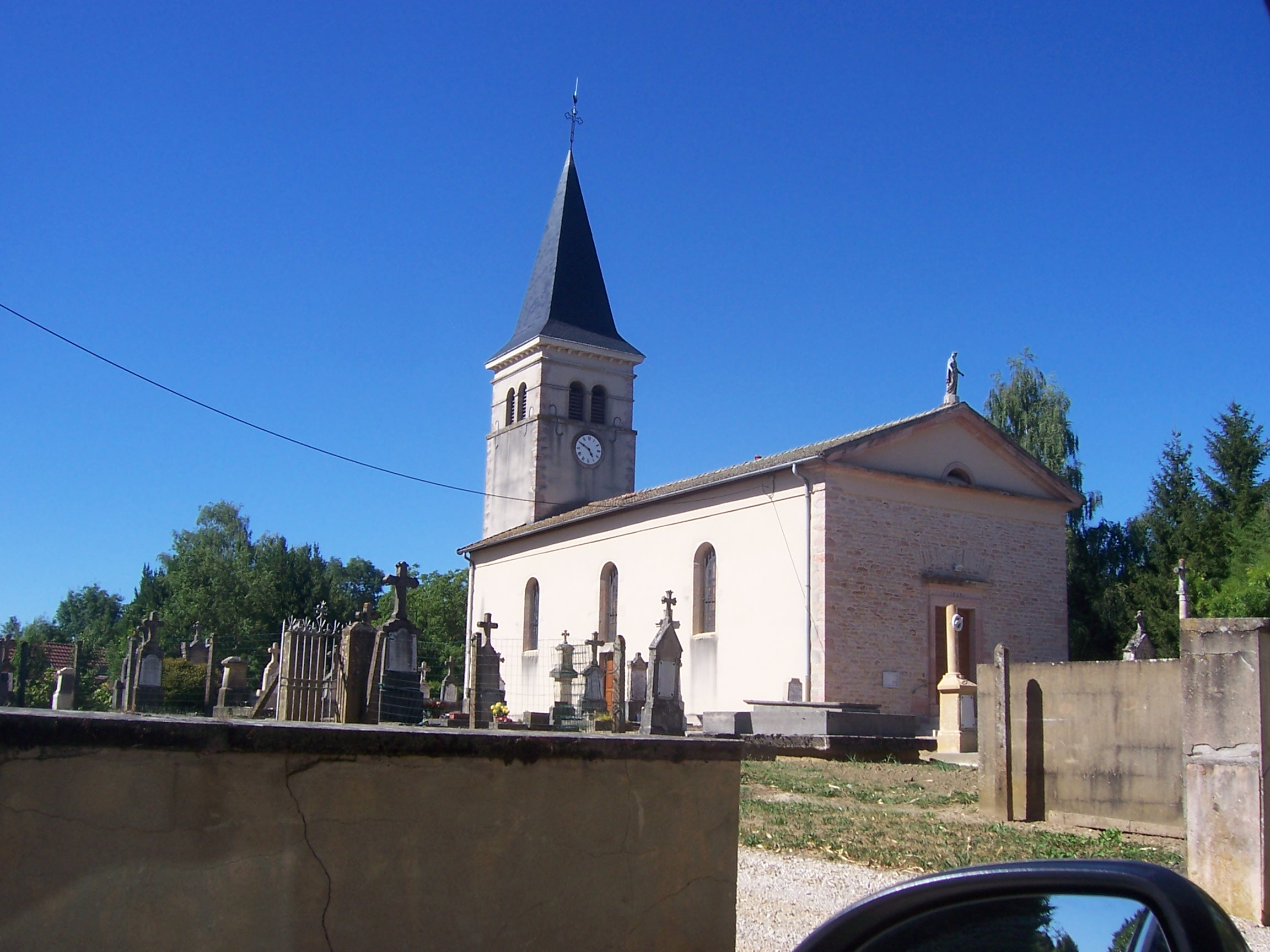
- The church in Jouvençon
- Location of Jouvençon
- Location within France Location within Bourgogne-Franche-Comté
- Coordinates: 46°34′30″N 5°03′19″E
- Country: France
- Region: Bourgogne-Franche-Comté
- Department: Saône-et-Loire
- Arrondissement: Louhans
- Canton: Cuiseaux

Government
  - Mayor (2022–2026): Hervé Voisin
- Area^{1}: 6.3 km^{2} (2.4 sq mi)
- Elevation: 193 m (633 ft)
- Highest elevation: 197 m (646 ft)
- Lowest elevation: 172 m (564 ft)
- Population (2023): 461
  - Density: 73/km^{2} (190/sq mi)
- Time zone: UTC+01:00 (CET)
  - Summer (DST): UTC+02:00 (CEST)
- INSEE/Postal code: 71244 /71290
- ^{1} French Land Register data, which excludes lakes, ponds, glaciers > 1 km^{2} (0.386 sq mi or 247 acres) and river estuaries.

Jouvençon (French pronunciation: [ʒuvɑ̃sɔ̃]) is a commune in the Saône-et-Loire department in the region of Bourgogne-Franche-Comté in eastern France.

== Geography ==
The Sâne Vive forms part of the commune's eastern border. The Seille forms the commune's western border.

== See also ==
- Communes of the Saône-et-Loire department
