= Brienne, Saône-et-Loire =

Brienne
- Commune
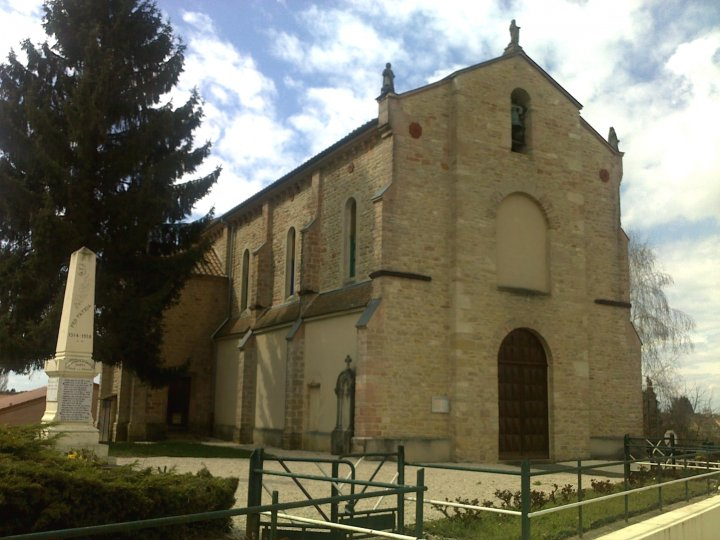
- The church in Brienne
- Location of Brienne
- Location within France Location within Bourgogne-Franche-Comté
- Coordinates: 46°33′28″N 5°01′21″E
- Country: France
- Region: Bourgogne-Franche-Comté
- Department: Saône-et-Loire
- Arrondissement: Louhans
- Canton: Cuiseaux
- Area^{1}: 5.65 km^{2} (2.18 sq mi)
- Elevation: 187 m (614 ft)
- Highest elevation: 199 m (653 ft)
- Lowest elevation: 172 m (564 ft)
- Population (2023): 488
  - Density: 86.4/km^{2} (224/sq mi)
- Time zone: UTC+01:00 (CET)
  - Summer (DST): UTC+02:00 (CEST)
- INSEE/Postal code: 71061 /71290
- ^{1} French Land Register data, which excludes lakes, ponds, glaciers > 1 km^{2} (0.386 sq mi or 247 acres) and river estuaries.

Brienne is a commune in the Saône-et-Loire department in the region of Bourgogne-Franche-Comté in eastern France. It is 37 km from Mâcon, the department capital.

== Geography ==
The Sâne Vive forms the commune's south-eastern border, then flow into the Seille, which forms its western and north-western borders.

== See also ==
- Communes of the Saône-et-Loire department
