= Lescheroux =

Commune in Auvergne-Rhône-Alpes, France

- Commune
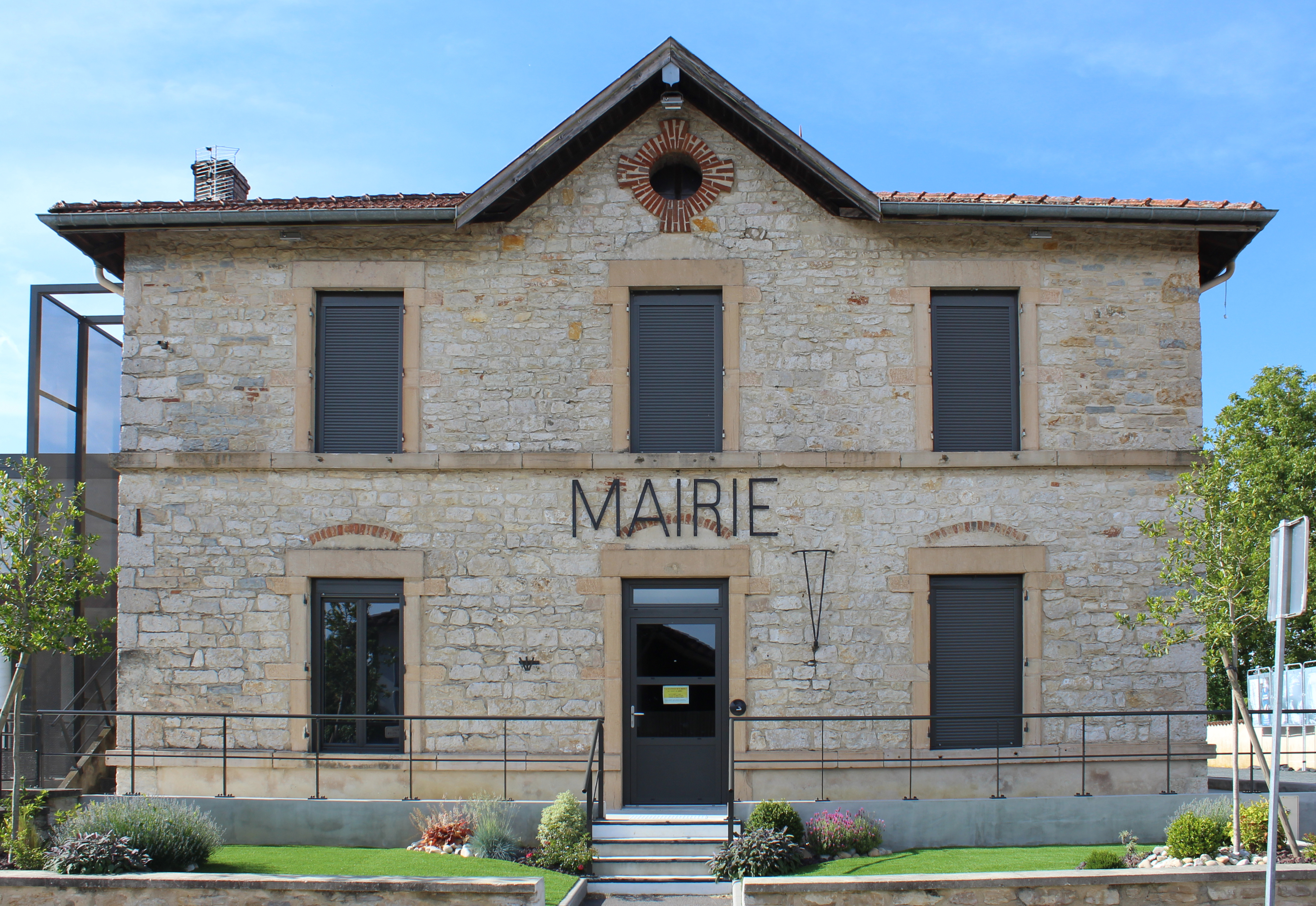
- Town hall
- Location of Lescheroux
- Location within France Location within Auvergne-Rhône-Alpes
- Coordinates: 46°24′27″N 5°08′50″E
- Country: France
- Region: Auvergne-Rhône-Alpes
- Department: Ain
- Arrondissement: Bourg-en-Bresse
- Canton: Replonges
- Intercommunality: CA Bassin de Bourg-en-Bresse

Government
  - Mayor (2026–32): Dominique Petitjean
- Area^{1}: 20.05 km^{2} (7.74 sq mi)
- Elevation: 210 m (690 ft)
- Highest elevation: 223 m (732 ft)
- Lowest elevation: 182 m (597 ft)
- Population (2023): 726
  - Density: 36.2/km^{2} (93.8/sq mi)
- Time zone: UTC+01:00 (CET)
  - Summer (DST): UTC+02:00 (CEST)
- INSEE/Postal code: 01212 /01560
- ^{1} French Land Register data, which excludes lakes, ponds, glaciers > 1 km^{2} (0.386 sq mi or 247 acres) and river estuaries.

Lescheroux is a commune in the Ain department in eastern France.

== Geography ==
The Sâne Vive has its source in the commune; it crosses the village and forms part of the commune's northern border.

The Sâne Morte forms part of the commune's northeastern border.

The Reyssouze flows northwest through the southwestern part of the commune.

== Population ==
Historical population
Year	Pop.	±% p.a.
1968	593	—
1975	526	−1.70%
1982	504	−0.61%
1990	527	+0.56%
1999	597	+1.40%
2007	691	+1.84%
2012	688	−0.09%
2017	735	+1.33%
2023	726	−0.21%
Source: INSEE

== See also ==
- Communes of the Ain department
