= Sâne Vive =

River in eastern France

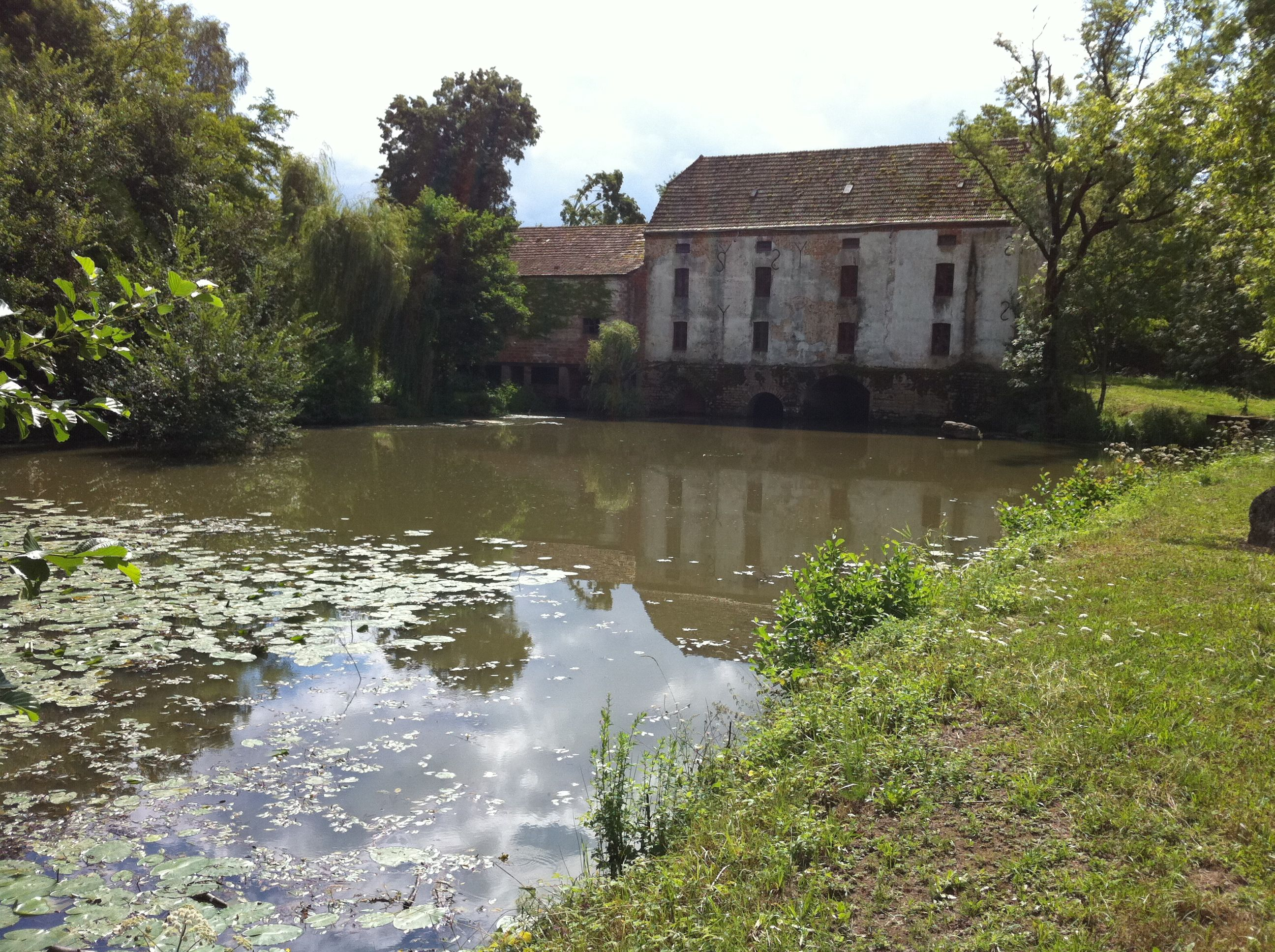

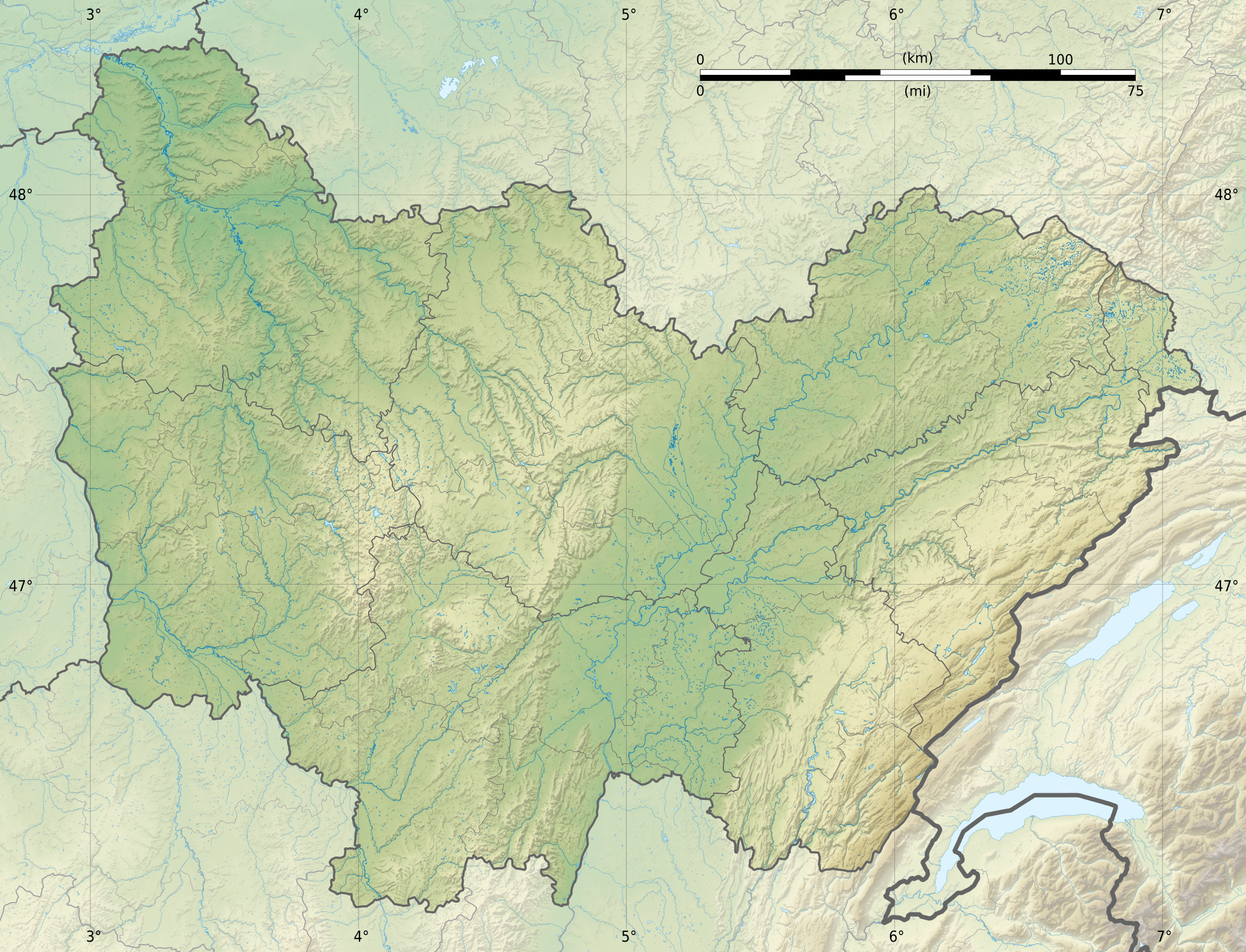
- Location within France Location within Bourgogne-Franche-Comté

Location
- Country: France

Physical characteristics
- Source
  - location: Lescheroux
  - coordinates: 46°23′54″N 05°09′06″E
  - elevation: 217 m (712 ft)
- Mouth
  - location: Seille
  - coordinates: 46°32′25″N 05°00′53″E
  - elevation: 172 m (564 ft)
- Length: 46.8 km (29.1 mi)

Basin features
- Progression: Seille→ Saône→ Rhône→ Mediterranean Sea

The Sâne Vive (French: la Sâne Vive), or Sâne, is a 46.8-kilometre (29.1 mi) long river in the Ain and Saône-et-Loire départements, eastern France. Its source is at Lescheroux. It flows generally northwest. It is a left tributary of the Seille into which it flows between La Genête and Brienne.

Its main tributary is the Sâne Morte.

== Départements and communes along its course ==
This list is ordered from source to mouth:

- Ain: Lescheroux, Saint-Nizier-le-Bouchoux, Courtes, Curciat-Dongalon,
- Saône-et-Loire: Montpont-en-Bresse, La Chapelle-Thècle, Ménetreuil, Jouvençon, La Genête, Brienne,
