= Ladoye-sur-Seille =

Commune in Bourgogne-Franche-Comté, France

- Commune
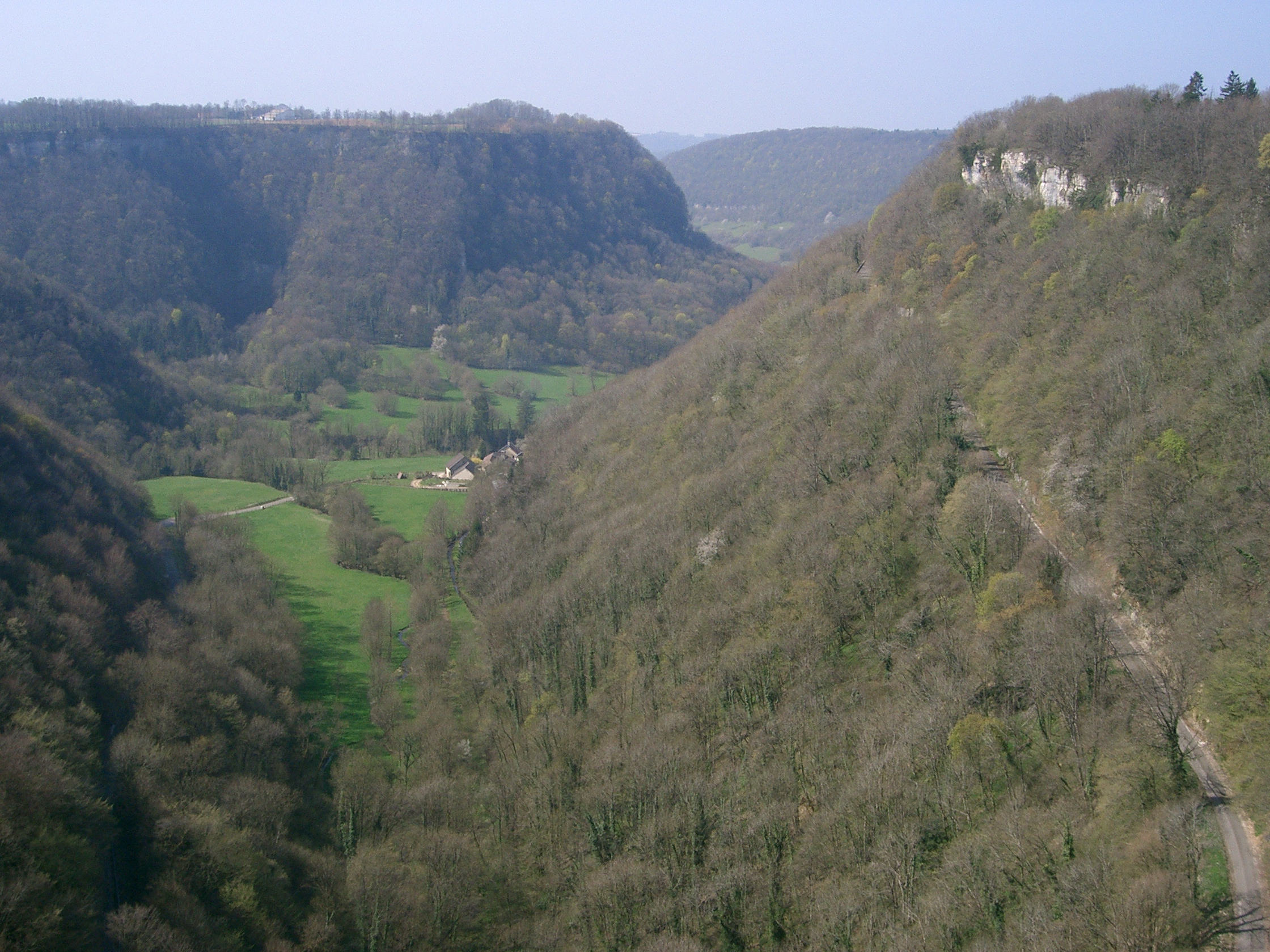
- The steephead valley of Ladoye-sur-Seille
- Location of Ladoye-sur-Seille
- Location within France Location within Bourgogne-Franche-Comté
- Coordinates: 46°45′45″N 5°41′04″E
- Country: France
- Region: Bourgogne-Franche-Comté
- Department: Jura
- Arrondissement: Lons-le-Saunier
- Canton: Poligny

Government
  - Mayor (2020–2026): Jean-Pierre Bejean
- Area^{1}: 3.69 km^{2} (1.42 sq mi)
- Highest elevation: 560 m (1,840 ft)
- Lowest elevation: 338 m (1,109 ft)
- Population (2023): 50
  - Density: 14/km^{2} (35/sq mi)
- Time zone: UTC+01:00 (CET)
  - Summer (DST): UTC+02:00 (CEST)
- INSEE/Postal code: 39272 /39210
- ^{1} French Land Register data, which excludes lakes, ponds, glaciers > 1 km^{2} (0.386 sq mi or 247 acres) and river estuaries.

Ladoye-sur-Seille (French pronunciation: [ladwa syʁ sɛj], literally Ladoye on Seille) is a commune in the Jura department in Bourgogne-Franche-Comté in eastern France.

== Population ==
Historical population
Year	Pop.	±% p.a.
1968	67	—
1975	68	+0.21%
1982	57	−2.49%
1990	47	−2.38%
1999	69	+4.36%
2007	61	−1.53%
2012	59	−0.66%
2017	52	−2.49%
2023	50	−0.65%
Source: INSEE

== See also ==
- Communes of the Jura department
