= Ménetreuil =

- Commune
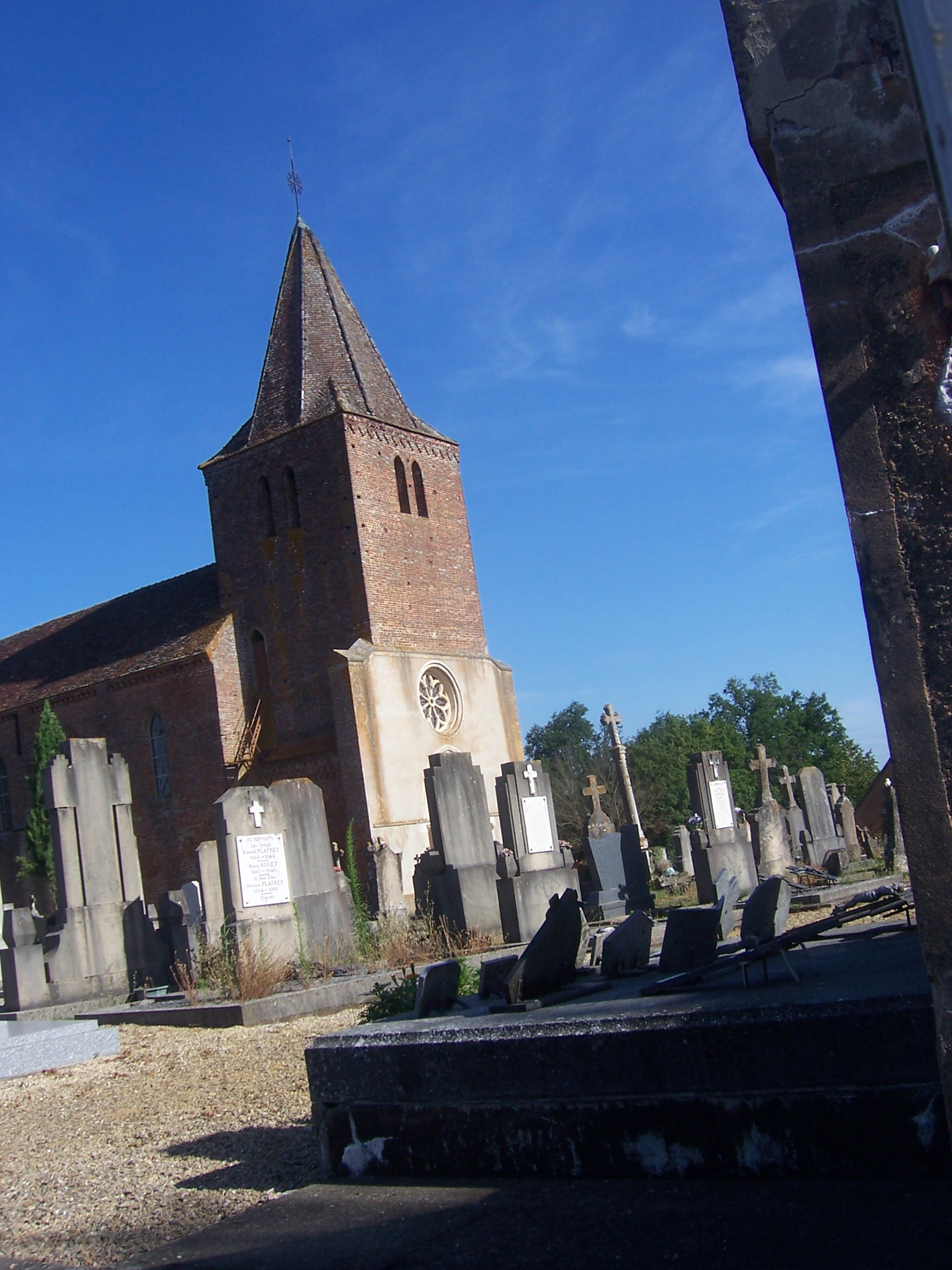
- The church in Ménetreuil
- Location of Ménetreuil
- Location within France Location within Bourgogne-Franche-Comté
- Coordinates: 46°35′01″N 5°06′46″E
- Country: France
- Region: Bourgogne-Franche-Comté
- Department: Saône-et-Loire
- Arrondissement: Louhans
- Canton: Cuiseaux
- Area^{1}: 15.04 km^{2} (5.81 sq mi)
- Elevation: 182 m (597 ft)
- Highest elevation: 203 m (666 ft)
- Lowest elevation: 174 m (571 ft)
- Population (2023): 412
  - Density: 27.4/km^{2} (70.9/sq mi)
- Time zone: UTC+01:00 (CET)
  - Summer (DST): UTC+02:00 (CEST)
- INSEE/Postal code: 71293 /71470
- ^{1} French Land Register data, which excludes lakes, ponds, glaciers > 1 km^{2} (0.386 sq mi or 247 acres) and river estuaries.

Ménetreuil is a commune in the Saône-et-Loire department in the region of Bourgogne-Franche-Comté in eastern France.

== Geography ==
The Sâne Morte forms most of the commune's northern border, flows southwest through the western part of the commune, then flows into the Sâne Vive, which forms the commune's southwestern border.

== See also ==
- Communes of the Saône-et-Loire department
