= Montpont-en-Bresse =

- Commune
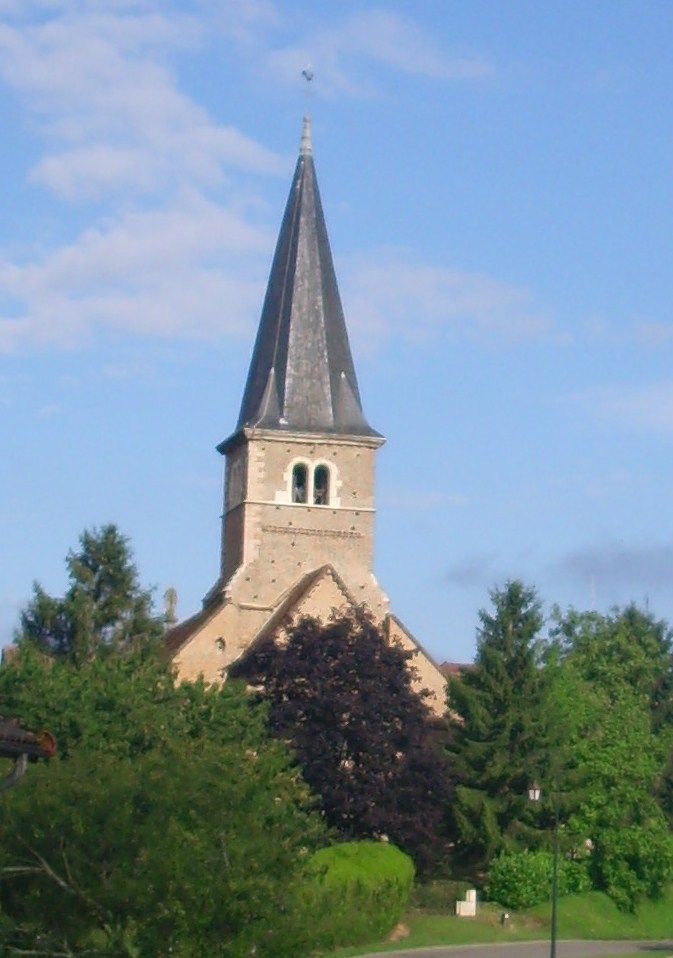
- The church in Montpont-en-Bresse

- Coat of arms
- Location of Montpont-en-Bresse
- Location within France Location within Bourgogne-Franche-Comté
- Coordinates: 46°33′29″N 5°09′54″E
- Country: France
- Region: Bourgogne-Franche-Comté
- Department: Saône-et-Loire
- Arrondissement: Louhans
- Canton: Cuiseaux
- Intercommunality: CC Terres de Bresse

Government
  - Mayor (2020–2026): Anne Moreira
- Area^{1}: 37.46 km^{2} (14.46 sq mi)
- Elevation: 198 m (650 ft)
- Highest elevation: 213 m (699 ft)
- Lowest elevation: 182 m (597 ft)
- Population (2023): 1,077
  - Density: 28.75/km^{2} (74.46/sq mi)
- Time zone: UTC+01:00 (CET)
  - Summer (DST): UTC+02:00 (CEST)
- INSEE/Postal code: 71318 /71470
- ^{1} French Land Register data, which excludes lakes, ponds, glaciers > 1 km^{2} (0.386 sq mi or 247 acres) and river estuaries.

Montpont-en-Bresse (French pronunciation: [mɔ̃pɔ̃ ɑ̃ bʁɛs], literally Montpont in Bresse) is a commune in the Saône-et-Loire department in the region of Bourgogne-Franche-Comté in eastern France.

== Geography ==
The Sâne Morte forms the commune's south-eastern border. The Sâne Vive flows northwestward through the middle of the commune.

== See also ==
- Communes of the Saône-et-Loire department
