= La Chapelle-Thècle =

- Commune
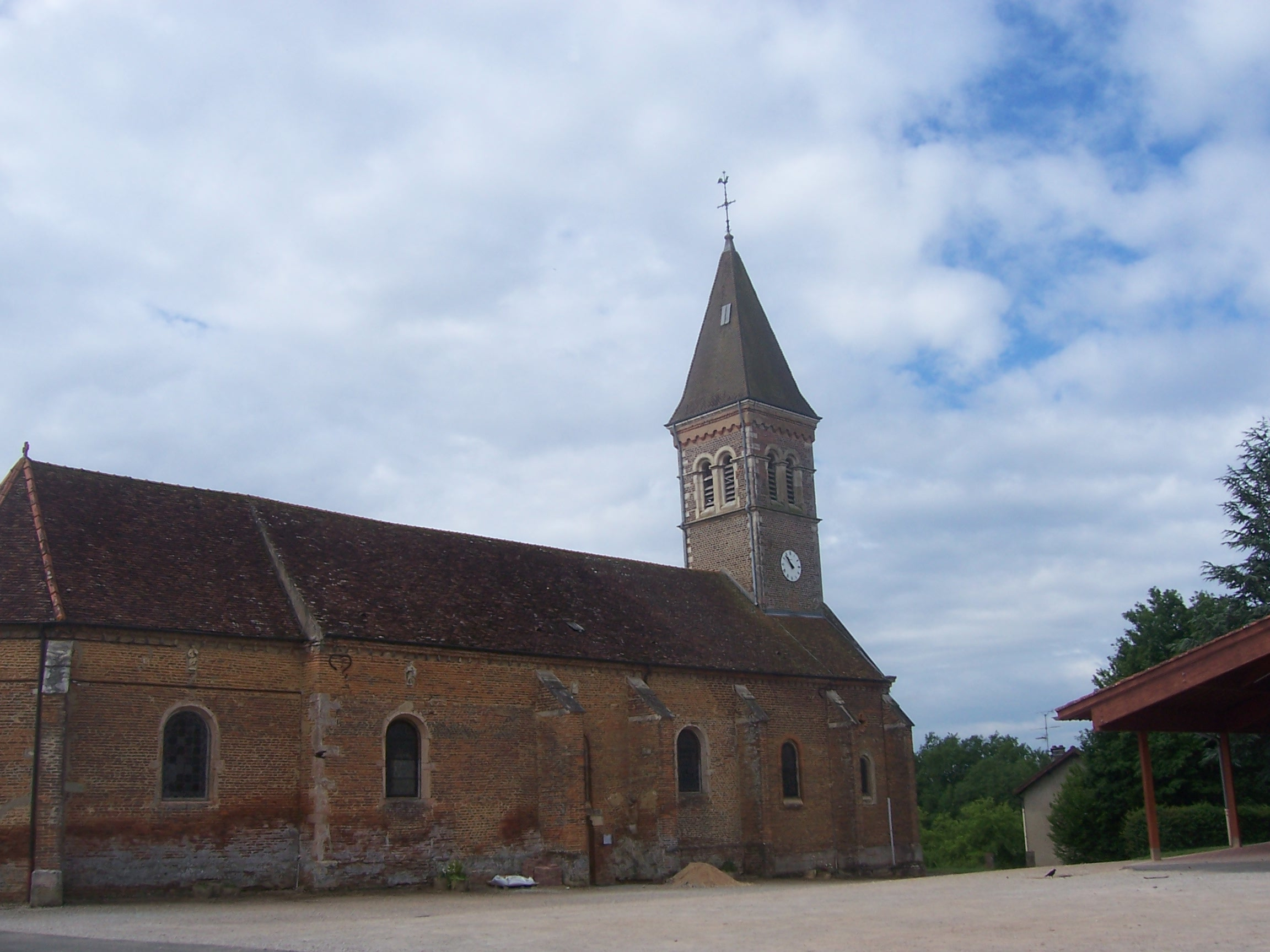
- The church in La Chapelle-Thècle
- Location of La Chapelle-Thècle
- Location within France Location within Bourgogne-Franche-Comté
- Coordinates: 46°33′25″N 5°06′52″E
- Country: France
- Region: Bourgogne-Franche-Comté
- Department: Saône-et-Loire
- Arrondissement: Louhans
- Canton: Cuiseaux
- Area^{1}: 16.48 km^{2} (6.36 sq mi)
- Elevation: 204 m (669 ft)
- Highest elevation: 204 m (669 ft)
- Lowest elevation: 174 m (571 ft)
- Population (2023): 517
  - Density: 31.4/km^{2} (81.3/sq mi)
- Time zone: UTC+01:00 (CET)
  - Summer (DST): UTC+02:00 (CEST)
- INSEE/Postal code: 71097 /71470
- ^{1} French Land Register data, which excludes lakes, ponds, glaciers > 1 km^{2} (0.386 sq mi or 247 acres) and river estuaries.

La Chapelle-Thècle (French pronunciation: [la ʃapɛl tɛkl]) is a commune in the Saône-et-Loire department in the region of Bourgogne-Franche-Comté in eastern France.

== Geography ==
The Sâne Vive flows north-northwest through the commune and forms its northwestern border.

== See also ==
- Communes of the Saône-et-Loire department
