= Courtes =

Commune in Auvergne-Rhône-Alpes, France

- Commune
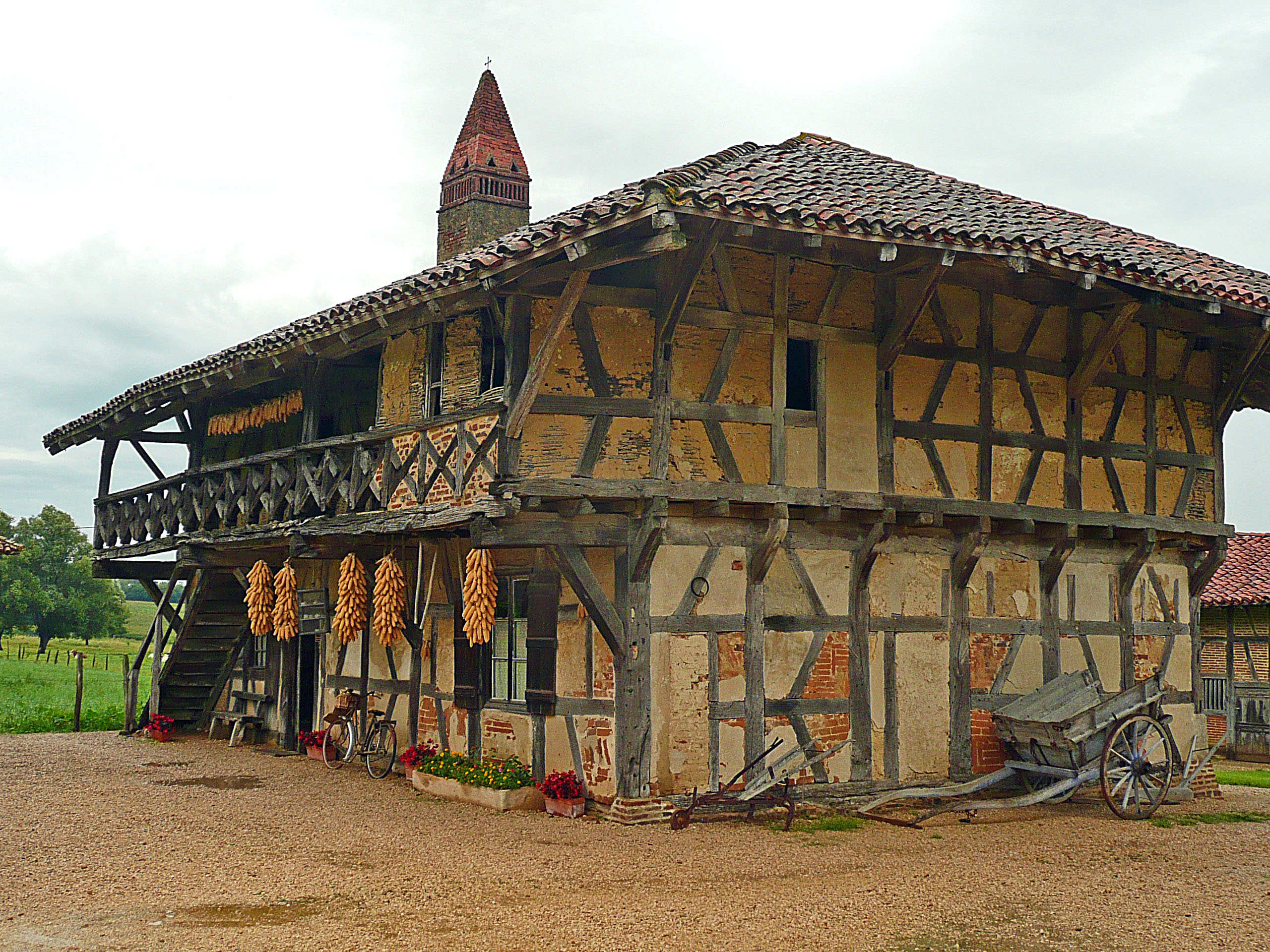
- Museum La Ferme de la forêt
- Location of Courtes
- Location within France Location within Auvergne-Rhône-Alpes
- Coordinates: 46°27′36″N 5°06′03″E
- Country: France
- Region: Auvergne-Rhône-Alpes
- Department: Ain
- Arrondissement: Bourg-en-Bresse
- Canton: Replonges
- Intercommunality: CA Bassin de Bourg-en-Bresse

Government
  - Mayor (2026–32): Thierry Pallegoix
- Area^{1}: 9.06 km^{2} (3.50 sq mi)
- Elevation: 212 m (696 ft)
- Highest elevation: 221 m (725 ft)
- Lowest elevation: 192 m (630 ft)
- Population (2023): 289
  - Density: 31.9/km^{2} (82.6/sq mi)
- Time zone: UTC+01:00 (CET)
  - Summer (DST): UTC+02:00 (CEST)
- INSEE/Postal code: 01128 /01560
- ^{1} French Land Register data, which excludes lakes, ponds, glaciers > 1 km^{2} (0.386 sq mi or 247 acres) and river estuaries.

Courtes (French pronunciation: [kuʁt]) is a commune in the Ain department in eastern France.

== Geography ==
The Sâne Vive forms part of the commune's eastern border.

=== Climate ===
Courtes has an oceanic climate (Köppen climate classification Cfb). The average annual temperature in Courtes is 11.4 °C (52.5 °F). The average annual rainfall is 1,004.1 mm (39.53 in) with October as the wettest month. The temperatures are highest on average in July, at around 20.7 °C (69.3 °F), and lowest in January, at around 2.5 °C (36.5 °F). The highest temperature ever recorded in Courtes was 38.6 °C (101.5 °F) on 11 August 1998; the coldest temperature ever recorded was −10.0 °C (14.0 °F) on 16 January 1985.

Climate data for Courtes (1981–2010 averages, extremes 1982−2000)
Month	Jan	Feb	Mar	Apr	May	Jun	Jul	Aug	Sep	Oct	Nov	Dec	Year
Record high °C (°F)	15.6 (60.1)	19.8 (67.6)	24.3 (75.7)	26.0 (78.8)	30.3 (86.5)	33.6 (92.5)	37.8 (100.0)	38.6 (101.5)	32.5 (90.5)	27.6 (81.7)	22.1 (71.8)	19.0 (66.2)	38.6 (101.5)
Mean daily maximum °C (°F)	5.3 (41.5)	7.3 (45.1)	12.3 (54.1)	15.4 (59.7)	20.3 (68.5)	23.5 (74.3)	26.9 (80.4)	26.6 (79.9)	22.1 (71.8)	16.2 (61.2)	9.5 (49.1)	6.5 (43.7)	16.0 (60.8)
Daily mean °C (°F)	2.5 (36.5)	3.8 (38.8)	7.5 (45.5)	10.2 (50.4)	14.8 (58.6)	17.8 (64.0)	20.7 (69.3)	20.1 (68.2)	16.4 (61.5)	12.0 (53.6)	6.3 (43.3)	3.9 (39.0)	11.4 (52.5)
Mean daily minimum °C (°F)	−0.2 (31.6)	0.2 (32.4)	2.7 (36.9)	5.0 (41.0)	9.3 (48.7)	12.1 (53.8)	14.4 (57.9)	13.7 (56.7)	10.8 (51.4)	7.9 (46.2)	3.0 (37.4)	1.3 (34.3)	6.7 (44.1)
Record low °C (°F)	−20.0 (−4.0)	−13.4 (7.9)	−6.5 (20.3)	−3.8 (25.2)	−1.5 (29.3)	3.2 (37.8)	5.5 (41.9)	4.5 (40.1)	1.0 (33.8)	−7.8 (18.0)	−9.0 (15.8)	−15.0 (5.0)	−20.0 (−4.0)
Average precipitation mm (inches)	76.6 (3.02)	65.9 (2.59)	62.9 (2.48)	92.9 (3.66)	102.6 (4.04)	76.4 (3.01)	80.3 (3.16)	78.5 (3.09)	86.3 (3.40)	103.4 (4.07)	99.6 (3.92)	78.7 (3.10)	1,004.1 (39.53)
Average precipitation days (≥ 1.0 mm)	12.1	10.7	10.8	11.7	12.5	9.7	9.0	8.9	8.5	11.9	11.3	11.4	128.5
Source: Meteociel

== Population ==
Historical population
Year	Pop.	±% p.a.
1968	254	—
1975	215	−2.35%
1982	199	−1.10%
1990	194	−0.32%
1999	218	+1.30%
2007	244	+1.42%
2012	272	+2.20%
2017	313	+2.85%
2023	289	−1.32%
Source: INSEE

== See also ==
- Communes of the Ain department
