= Saint-Nizier-le-Bouchoux =

Commune in Auvergne-Rhône-Alpes, France

- Commune
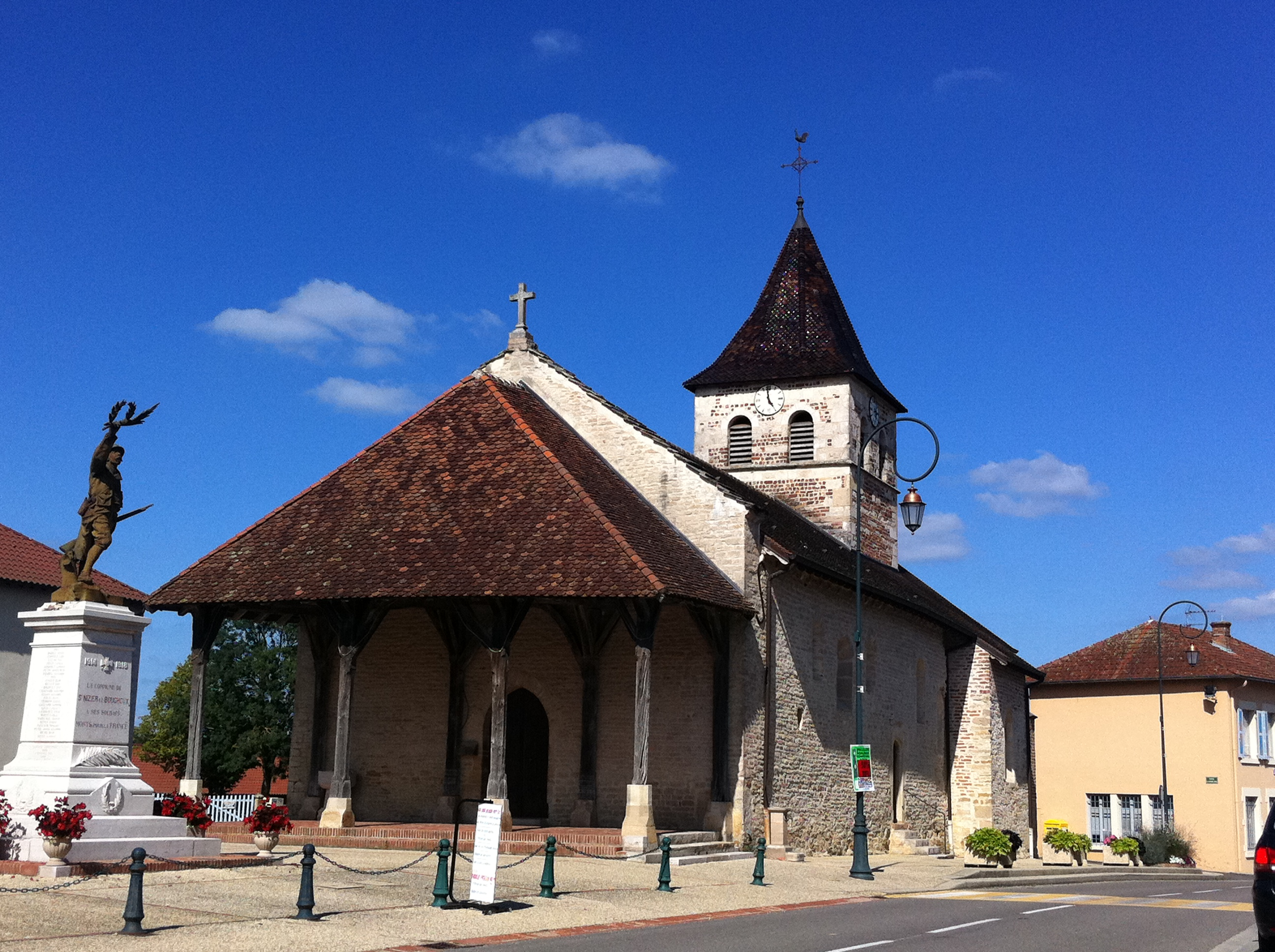
- Location of Saint-Nizier-le-Bouchoux
- Location within France Location within Auvergne-Rhône-Alpes
- Coordinates: 46°27′37″N 5°09′06″E
- Country: France
- Region: Auvergne-Rhône-Alpes
- Department: Ain
- Arrondissement: Bourg-en-Bresse
- Canton: Replonges
- Intercommunality: CA Bassin de Bourg-en-Bresse

Government
  - Mayor (2026–32): Alexandre André
- Area^{1}: 28.3 km^{2} (10.9 sq mi)
- Elevation: 208 m (682 ft)
- Highest elevation: 222 m (728 ft)
- Lowest elevation: 192 m (630 ft)
- Population (2023): 580
  - Density: 20/km^{2} (53/sq mi)
- Time zone: UTC+01:00 (CET)
  - Summer (DST): UTC+02:00 (CEST)
- INSEE/Postal code: 01380 /01560
- ^{1} French Land Register data, which excludes lakes, ponds, glaciers > 1 km^{2} (0.386 sq mi or 247 acres) and river estuaries.

Saint-Nizier-le-Bouchoux (French pronunciation: [sɛ̃ nizje lə buʃu]) is a commune in the Ain department in eastern France.

== Geography ==
The Sâne Morte forms the commune's eastern border.

The Sâne Vive flows north through the western part of the commune and forms part of its northwestern border.

== Population ==
Historical population
Year	Pop.	±% p.a.
1968	886	—
1975	743	−2.48%
1982	657	−1.74%
1990	625	−0.62%
1999	546	−1.49%
2007	749	+4.03%
2012	682	−1.86%
2017	680	−0.06%
2023	580	−2.62%
Source: INSEE

== See also ==
- Communes of the Ain department
