= Curciat-Dongalon =

Commune in Auvergne-Rhône-Alpes, France

- Commune
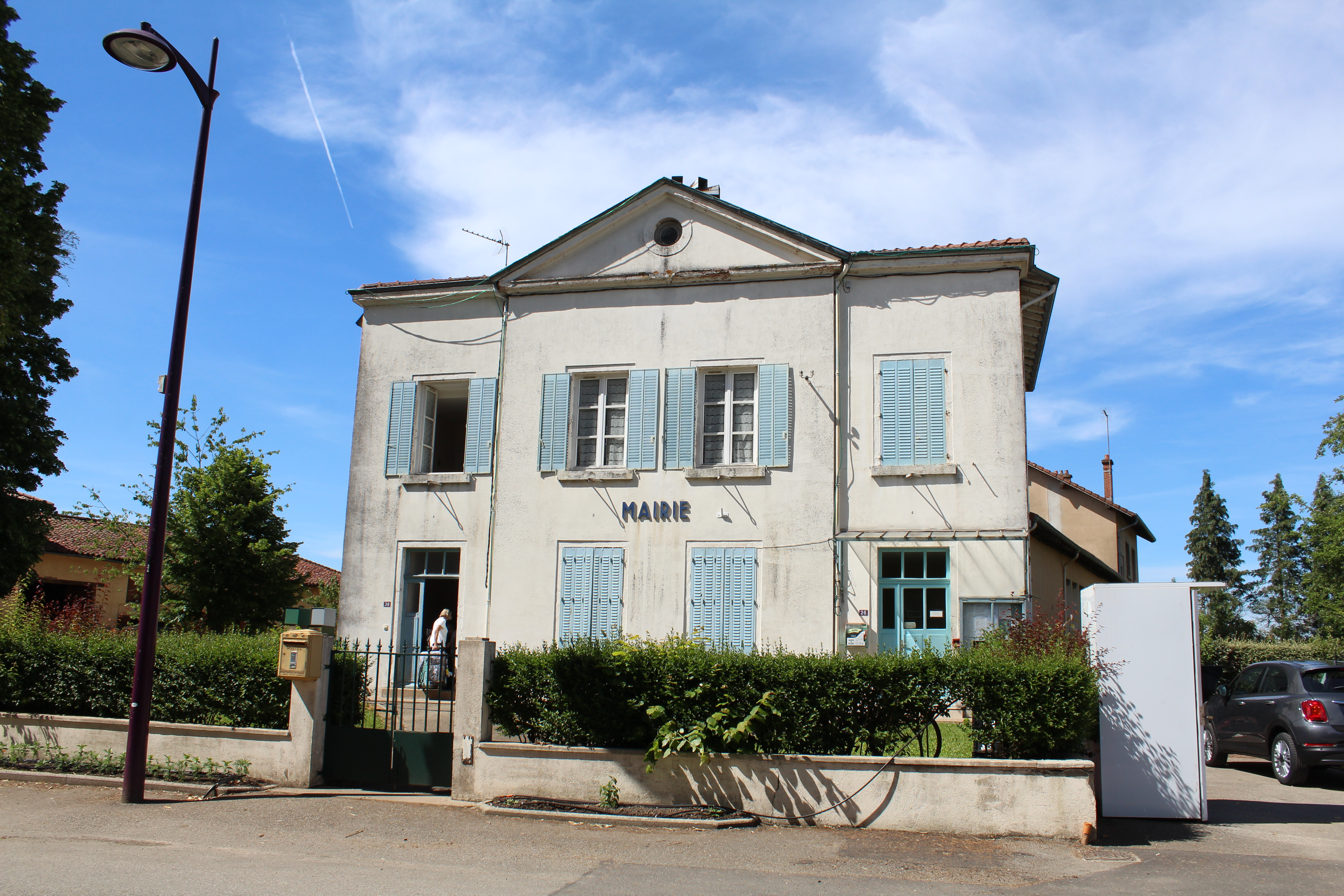
- Town hall
- Location of Curciat-Dongalon
- Location within France Location within Auvergne-Rhône-Alpes
- Coordinates: 46°28′32″N 5°09′30″E
- Country: France
- Region: Auvergne-Rhône-Alpes
- Department: Ain
- Arrondissement: Bourg-en-Bresse
- Canton: Replonges
- Intercommunality: CA Bassin de Bourg-en-Bresse

Government
  - Mayor (2026–32): Didier Fleury
- Area^{1}: 23.94 km^{2} (9.24 sq mi)
- Elevation: 216 m (709 ft)
- Highest elevation: 218 m (715 ft)
- Lowest elevation: 187 m (614 ft)
- Population (2023): 472
  - Density: 19.7/km^{2} (51.1/sq mi)
- Time zone: UTC+01:00 (CET)
  - Summer (DST): UTC+02:00 (CEST)
- INSEE/Postal code: 01139 /01560
- ^{1} French Land Register data, which excludes lakes, ponds, glaciers > 1 km^{2} (0.386 sq mi or 247 acres) and river estuaries.

Curciat-Dongalon (French pronunciation: [kyʁsja dɔ̃ɡalɔ̃]) is a commune in the Ain department in eastern France.

== Geography ==
The Sâne Morte forms part of the commune's north-eastern border. The Sâne Vive flows northward through the middle of the commune.

== Population ==
Historical population
Year	Pop.	±% p.a.
1968	725	—
1975	575	−3.26%
1982	512	−1.64%
1990	449	−1.63%
1999	404	−1.17%
2007	423	+0.58%
2012	451	+1.29%
2017	440	−0.49%
2023	472	+1.18%
Source: INSEE

== See also ==
- Communes of the Ain department
