= Nevy-sur-Seille =

Commune in Bourgogne-Franche-Comté, France

- Commune
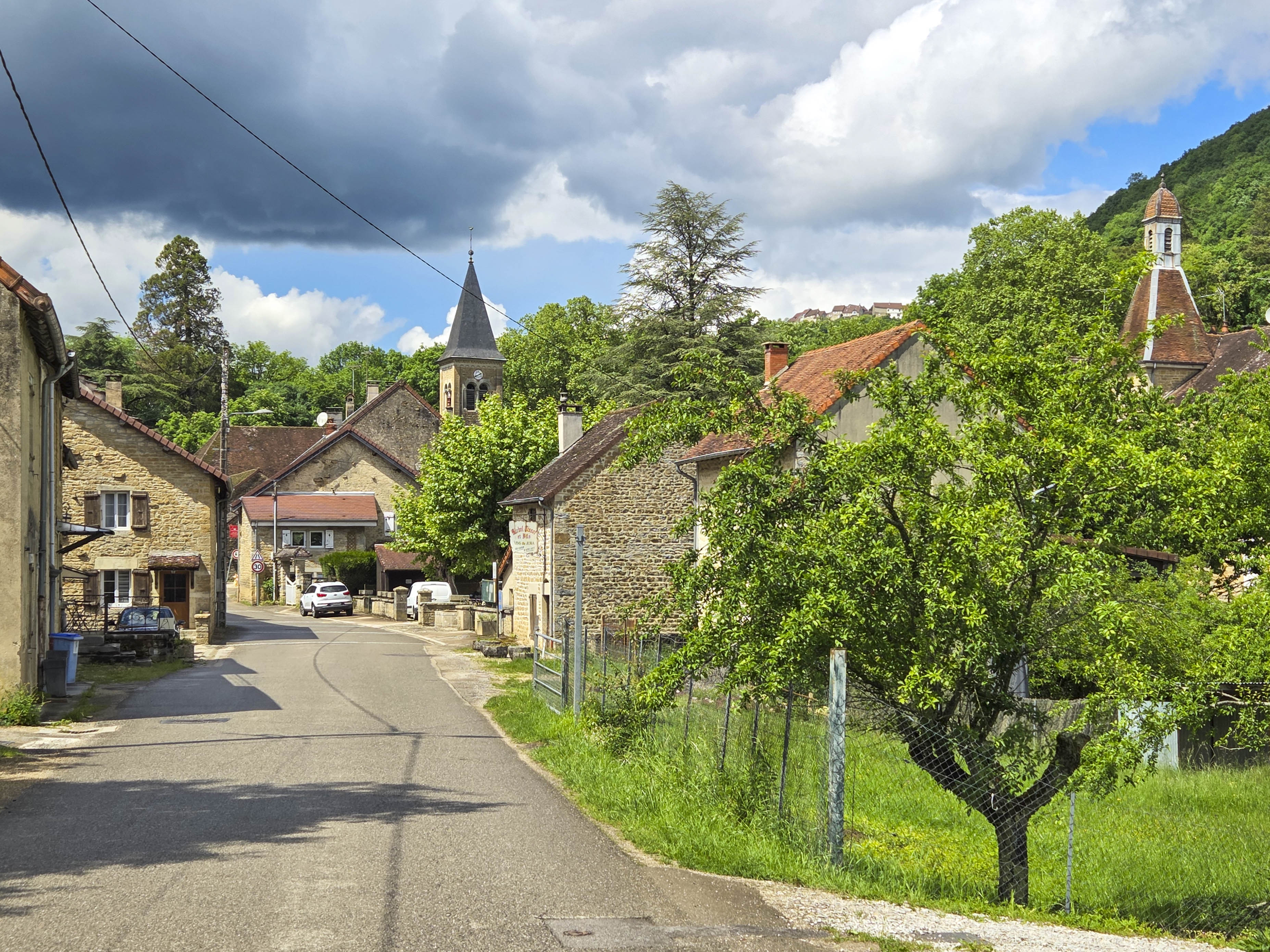
- A general view of Nevy-sur-Seille
- Location of Nevy-sur-Seille
- Location within France Location within Bourgogne-Franche-Comté
- Coordinates: 46°44′33″N 5°37′52″E
- Country: France
- Region: Bourgogne-Franche-Comté
- Department: Jura
- Arrondissement: Lons-le-Saunier
- Canton: Poligny

Government
  - Mayor (2020–2026): Gisèle Ghelma
- Area^{1}: 6.56 km^{2} (2.53 sq mi)
- Highest elevation: 526 m (1,726 ft)
- Lowest elevation: 257 m (843 ft)
- Population (2023): 199
  - Density: 30.3/km^{2} (78.6/sq mi)
- Time zone: UTC+01:00 (CET)
  - Summer (DST): UTC+02:00 (CEST)
- INSEE/Postal code: 39388 /39210
- ^{1} French Land Register data, which excludes lakes, ponds, glaciers > 1 km^{2} (0.386 sq mi or 247 acres) and river estuaries.

Nevy-sur-Seille (French pronunciation: [nøvi syʁ sɛj], literally Nevy on Seille) is a commune in the Jura department in Bourgogne-Franche-Comté in eastern France.

== Population ==
Historical population
Year	Pop.	±% p.a.
1968	274	—
1975	238	−1.99%
1982	239	+0.06%
1990	238	−0.05%
1999	246	+0.37%
2007	238	−0.41%
2012	224	−1.21%
2017	205	−1.76%
2023	199	−0.49%
Source: INSEE

== See also ==
- Communes of the Jura department
