= La Truchère =

- Commune
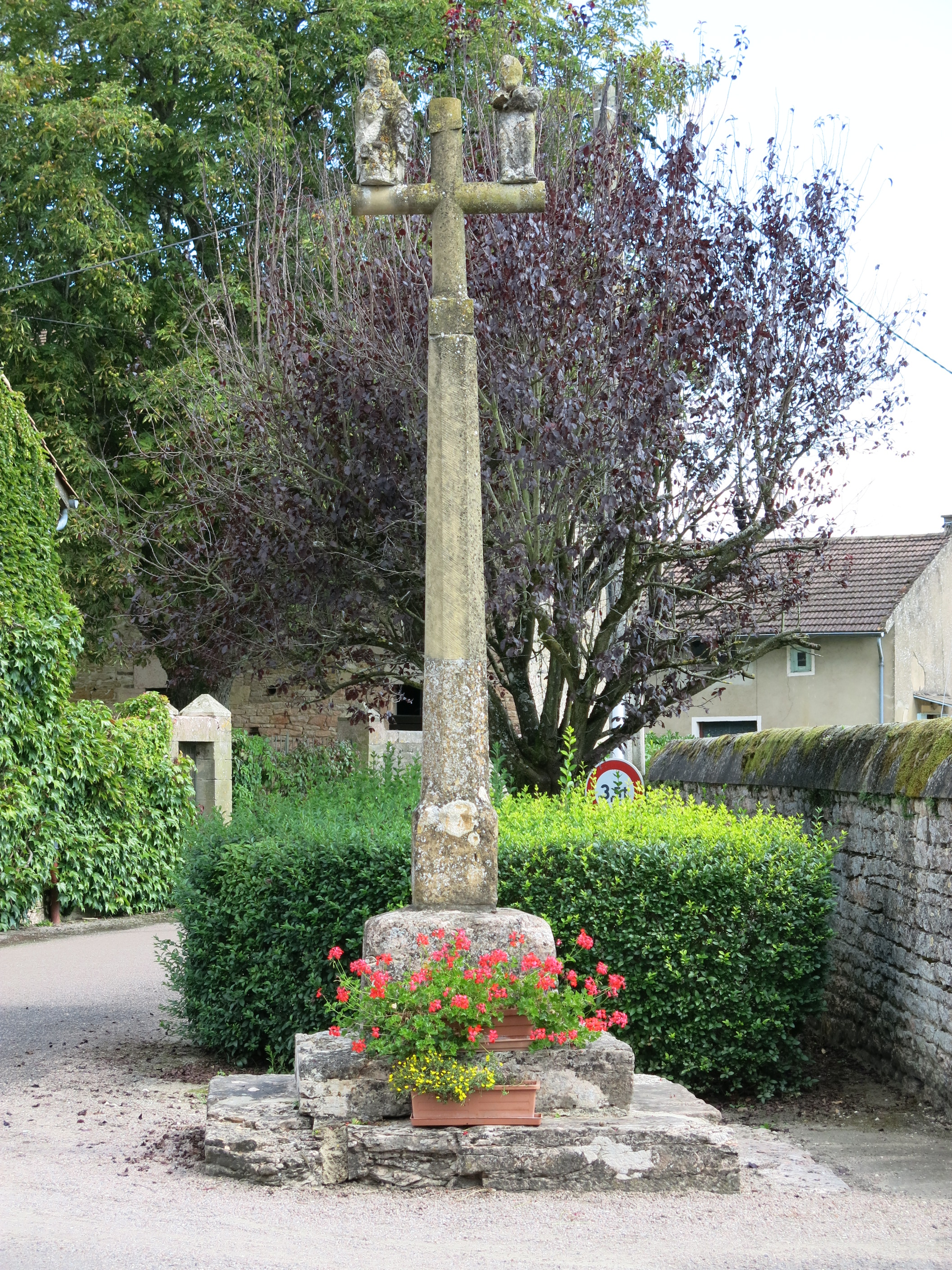
- The cross in La Truchère

- Coat of arms
- Location of La Truchère
- Location within France Location within Bourgogne-Franche-Comté
- Coordinates: 46°31′00″N 4°57′08″E
- Country: France
- Region: Bourgogne-Franche-Comté
- Department: Saône-et-Loire
- Arrondissement: Mâcon
- Canton: Tournus

Government
  - Mayor (2023–2026): Josette Pothier
- Area^{1}: 5.09 km^{2} (1.97 sq mi)
- Elevation: 185 m (607 ft)
- Highest elevation: 179 m (587 ft)
- Lowest elevation: 169 m (554 ft)
- Population (2023): 200
  - Density: 39/km^{2} (100/sq mi)
- Time zone: UTC+01:00 (CET)
  - Summer (DST): UTC+02:00 (CEST)
- INSEE/Postal code: 71549 /71290
- ^{1} French Land Register data, which excludes lakes, ponds, glaciers > 1 km^{2} (0.386 sq mi or 247 acres) and river estuaries.

La Truchère (French pronunciation: [la tʁyʃɛʁ]) is a commune in the Saône-et-Loire department in the region of Bourgogne-Franche-Comté in eastern France.

== See also ==
- Communes of the Saône-et-Loire department
