= Seille (Saône) =

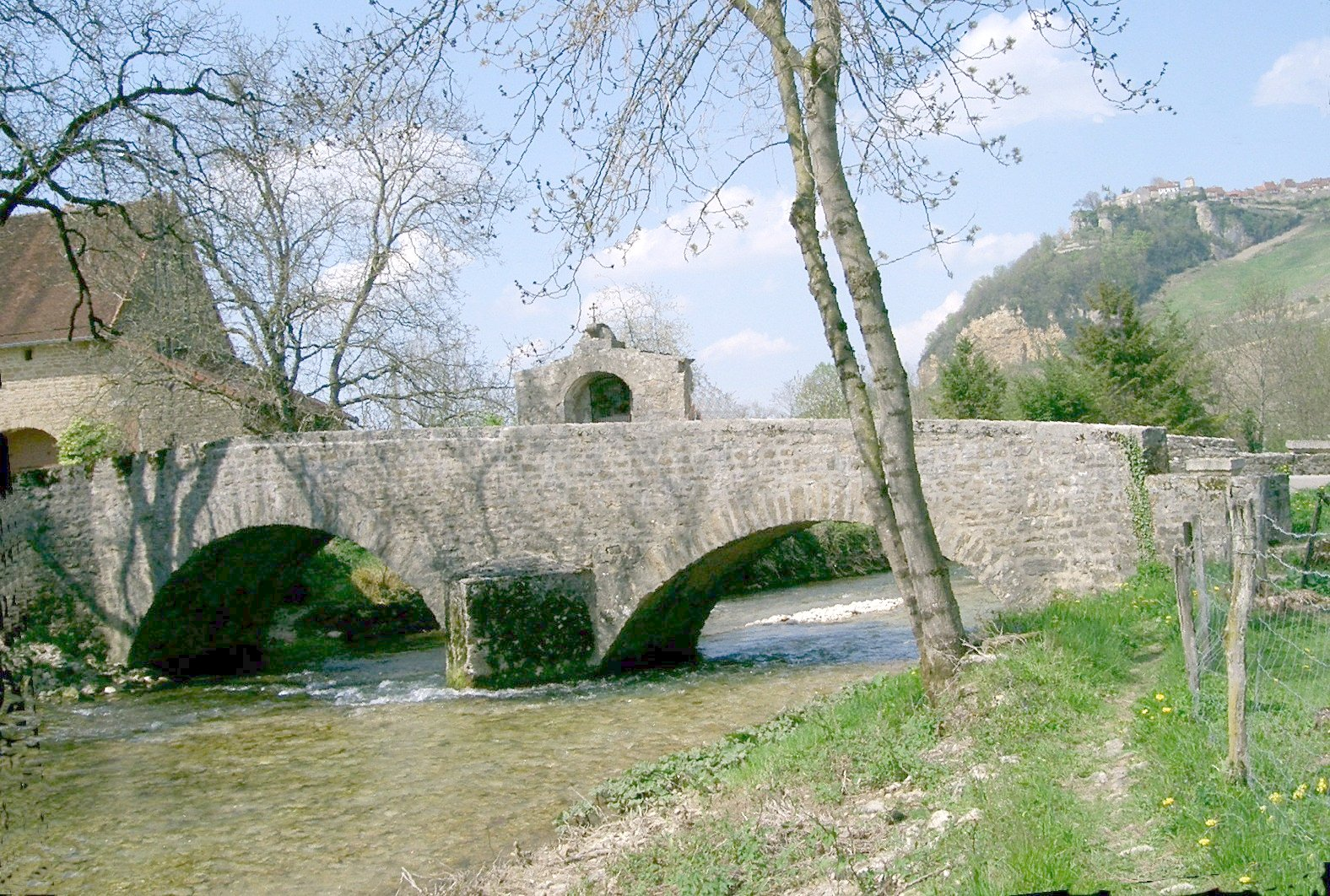
- Seille, in Nevy-sur-Seille.

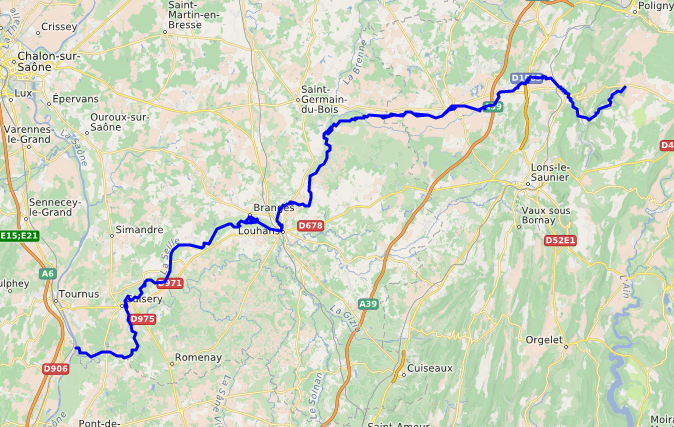

Location
- Country: France

Physical characteristics
- Source
  - location: Ladoye-sur-Seille, Jura
- Mouth: Saône
  - location: La Truchère
  - coordinates: 46°31′11″N 4°56′28″E
- Length: 100.5 km (62.4 mi)
- Basin size: 2,300 km^{2} (890 sq mi)

Basin features
- Progression: Saône→ Rhône→ Mediterranean Sea

The Seille (French pronunciation: [sɛj]) is a river originating in the Jura Mountains in France. It is a left tributary of the Saône, joining it in the commune of La Truchère, in Saône-et-Loire. It is 100.5 km (62.4 mi) long.

The river's headwaters are in the reculée (blind valley) of Ladoye-sur-Seille, approximately 8 km south of Poligny. It is joined by the Seille de Beaume, that springs in the blind valley of Baume-les-Messieurs, in Nevy-sur-Seille. From there it crosses the vineyards of the Jura department, irrigating the communes of Nevy-sur-Seille, Voiteur, and Arlay, before reaching the agricultural plain of Bletterans. It then passes Louhans and the Bresse area in the department of Saône-et-Loire, finally flowing into the Saône at La Truchère, a few kilometers south of Tournus. Near its mouth, the Seille forms a 3047 hectare network of ponds, dunes, and bogs, providing a habitat for a large number of migratory birds, including endangered species and rare plant species.

The upper part of the Seille is a tranquil trout stream that sometimes overflows its banks in the spring. The lower part, also prone to substantial flooding, is navigable for 39 kilometers from Louhans to La Truchère; there one can find catfish that have inhabited the river since the 1960s and that occasionally become very large. The river is known for, in the 1980s, having the largest catches of catfish in France (record: 2.20 m, 66 kg).

"Nothing much happens on the Seille and that is its special charm. It runs through a closed-in, rolling countryside with few villages and little else along its banks but fields, trees and cows. It carries hardly any traffic, has only four tired old locks and is wonderfully free of the disturbance from road or rail that often shatters the peace in other places. The Seille is a place apart, isolated from the noisy world around it, almost forgotten and little known". Hart Massey, Travels with Lionel: A Small Barge in France (1988), pg. 151.

The Seille catchment area covers 2300 km², containing some 600 km of watercourses in three departments: Jura, Saône-et-Loire, and Ain; it is thus located in three administrative regions. A river contract for the Seille basin was put in place by the Saône and Doubs Mixed Syndicate in 2002, with financial assistance from regional and general councils, the Water Agency, and the State. The contract concerns water quality and the flooding of residential areas, which can affect more than thirty communes: the three most affected regions being the Louhans metropolitan area, Bletterans, and Voiteur.

The Solnan and the Sâne Vive are among its tributaries.
