= Nizier =

Nizier may refer to:

Places:

- Saint-Nizier-d'Azergues, commune in the Rhône department in eastern France
- Saint-Nizier-de-Fornas, commune in the Loire department in central France
- Saint-Nizier-du-Moucherotte, commune in the Isère department in southeastern France
- Saint-Nizier-le-Bouchoux, commune in the Ain department in eastern France
- Saint-Nizier-le-Désert, commune in the Ain department in eastern France
- Saint-Nizier-sous-Charlieu, commune in the Loire department in central France
- Saint-Nizier-sur-Arroux, commune in the Saône-et-Loire department in the region of Bourgogne in eastern France

People:

- Nizier Anthelme Philippe (born 1849), ran a school of magnetism and massage at Lyon

Churches:

- Saint-Nizier (Lyon), church of the city of Lyon, France
