= Saint-Symphorien-de-Marmagne =

- Commune
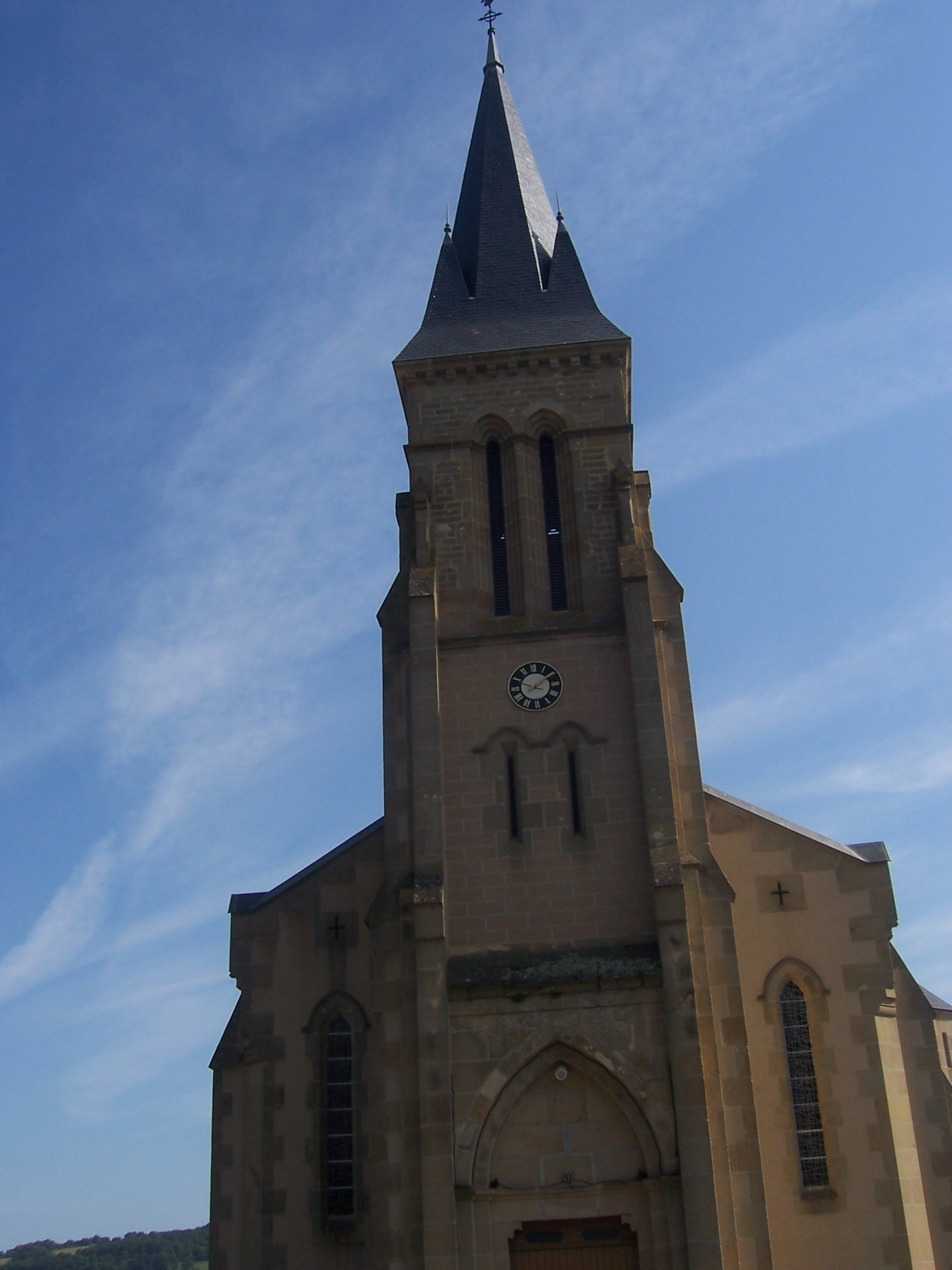
- The church in Saint-Symphorien-de-Marmagne
- Location of Saint-Symphorien-de-Marmagne
- Location within France Location within Bourgogne-Franche-Comté
- Coordinates: 46°50′27″N 4°19′52″E
- Country: France
- Region: Bourgogne-Franche-Comté
- Department: Saône-et-Loire
- Arrondissement: Autun
- Canton: Autun-2
- Intercommunality: CU Creusot Montceau
- Area^{1}: 37.31 km^{2} (14.41 sq mi)
- Elevation: 306 m (1,004 ft)
- Highest elevation: 635 m (2,083 ft)
- Lowest elevation: 286 m (938 ft)
- Population (2023): 827
  - Density: 22.2/km^{2} (57.4/sq mi)
- Time zone: UTC+01:00 (CET)
  - Summer (DST): UTC+02:00 (CEST)
- INSEE/Postal code: 71482 /71710
- ^{1} French Land Register data, which excludes lakes, ponds, glaciers > 1 km^{2} (0.386 sq mi or 247 acres) and river estuaries.

Saint-Symphorien-de-Marmagne (French pronunciation: [sɛ̃ sɛ̃fɔʁjɛ̃ d(ə) maʁmaɲ], lit. "St Symphorien of Marmagne") is a commune in the Saône-et-Loire department in the Bourgogne-Franche-Comté region in central-east France.

== Transport ==
Saint-Symphorien-de-Marmagne is served by the TER Bourgogne-Franche-Comté Saint-Symphorien-de-Marmagne station on the Nevers–Chagny railway.

== See also ==
- Communes of the Saône-et-Loire department
