= Marmagne =

Marmagne may refer to:

- Marmagne, Cher, France
- Marmagne, Côte-d'Or, France
- Marmagne, Saône-et-Loire, France
