= La Chapelle-sous-Uchon =

- Commune
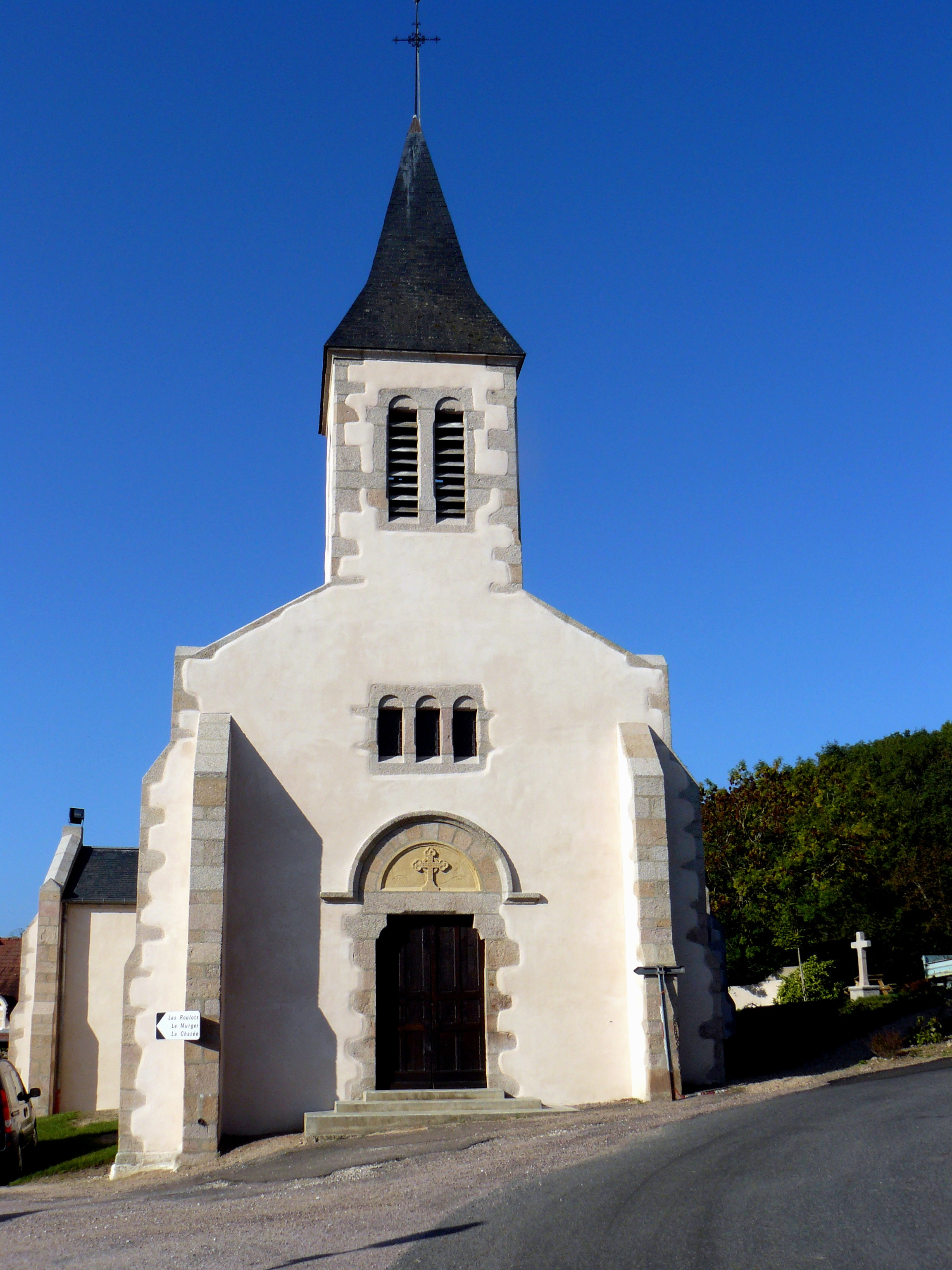
- The church in La Chapelle-sous-Uchon
- Location of La Chapelle-sous-Uchon
- Location within France Location within Bourgogne-Franche-Comté
- Coordinates: 46°50′12″N 4°14′02″E
- Country: France
- Region: Bourgogne-Franche-Comté
- Department: Saône-et-Loire
- Arrondissement: Autun
- Canton: Autun-2
- Area^{1}: 16.59 km^{2} (6.41 sq mi)
- Elevation: 465 m (1,526 ft)
- Highest elevation: 605 m (1,985 ft)
- Lowest elevation: 285 m (935 ft)
- Population (2023): 198
  - Density: 11.9/km^{2} (30.9/sq mi)
- Time zone: UTC+01:00 (CET)
  - Summer (DST): UTC+02:00 (CEST)
- INSEE/Postal code: 71096 /71190
- ^{1} French Land Register data, which excludes lakes, ponds, glaciers > 1 km^{2} (0.386 sq mi or 247 acres) and river estuaries.

La Chapelle-sous-Uchon is a commune in the Saône-et-Loire department in the region of Bourgogne-Franche-Comté in eastern France.

== See also ==
- Communes of the Saône-et-Loire department
