= Charbonnat =

- Commune
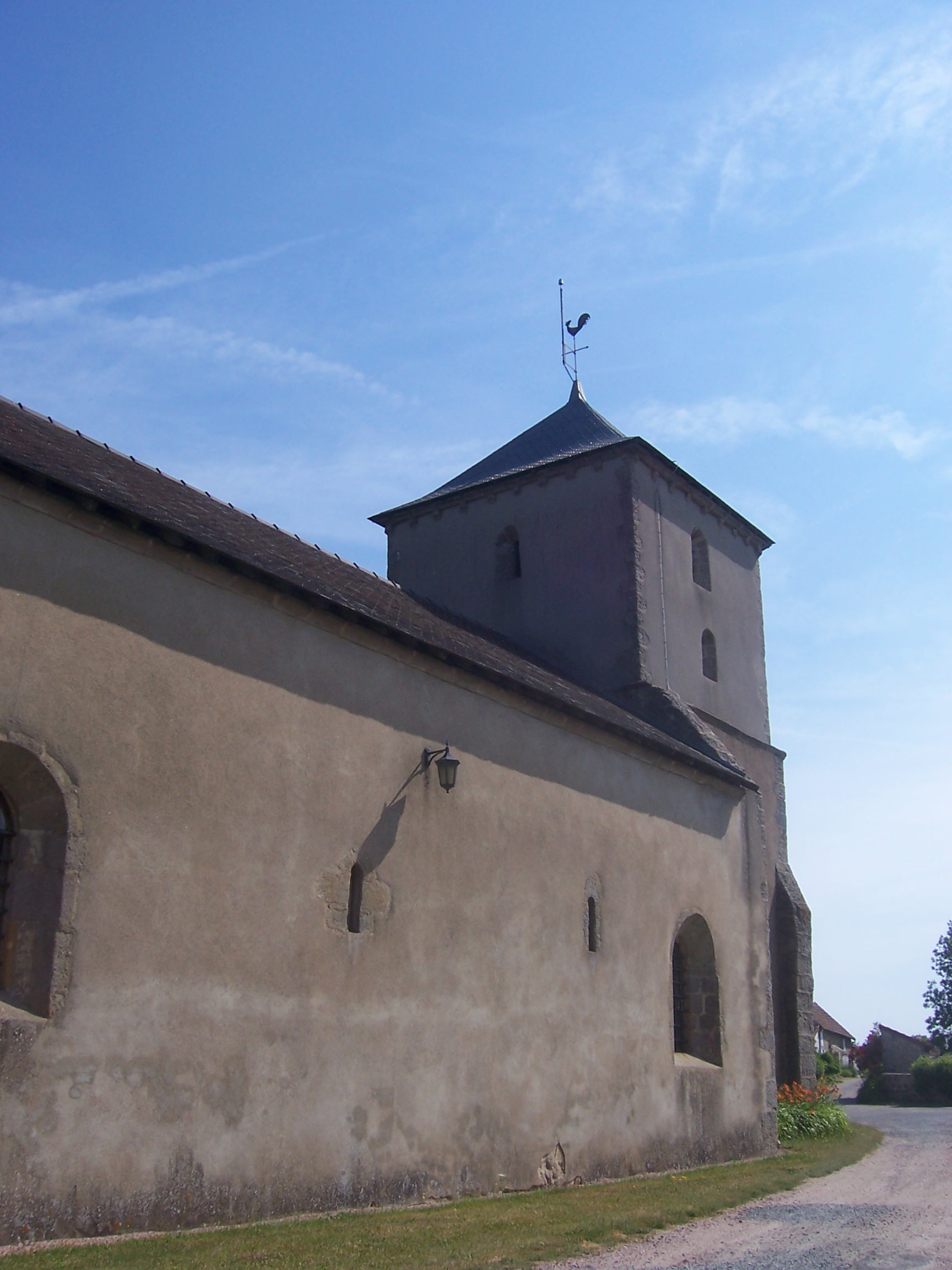
- The church in Charbonnat
- Location of Charbonnat
- Location within France Location within Bourgogne-Franche-Comté
- Coordinates: 46°47′22″N 4°06′56″E
- Country: France
- Region: Bourgogne-Franche-Comté
- Department: Saône-et-Loire
- Arrondissement: Autun
- Canton: Autun-2
- Intercommunality: Grand Autunois Morvan

Government
  - Mayor (2020–2026): Fabrice Voillot
- Area^{1}: 22.23 km^{2} (8.58 sq mi)
- Elevation: 268 m (879 ft)
- Highest elevation: 472 m (1,549 ft)
- Lowest elevation: 257 m (843 ft)
- Population (2023): 216
  - Density: 9.72/km^{2} (25.2/sq mi)
- Time zone: UTC+01:00 (CET)
  - Summer (DST): UTC+02:00 (CEST)
- INSEE/Postal code: 71098 /71320
- ^{1} French Land Register data, which excludes lakes, ponds, glaciers > 1 km^{2} (0.386 sq mi or 247 acres) and river estuaries.

Charbonnat (French pronunciation: [ʃaʁbɔna]) is a commune in the Saône-et-Loire department in the region of Bourgogne-Franche-Comté in eastern France.

== See also ==
- Communes of the Saône-et-Loire department
