= Dettey =

- Commune
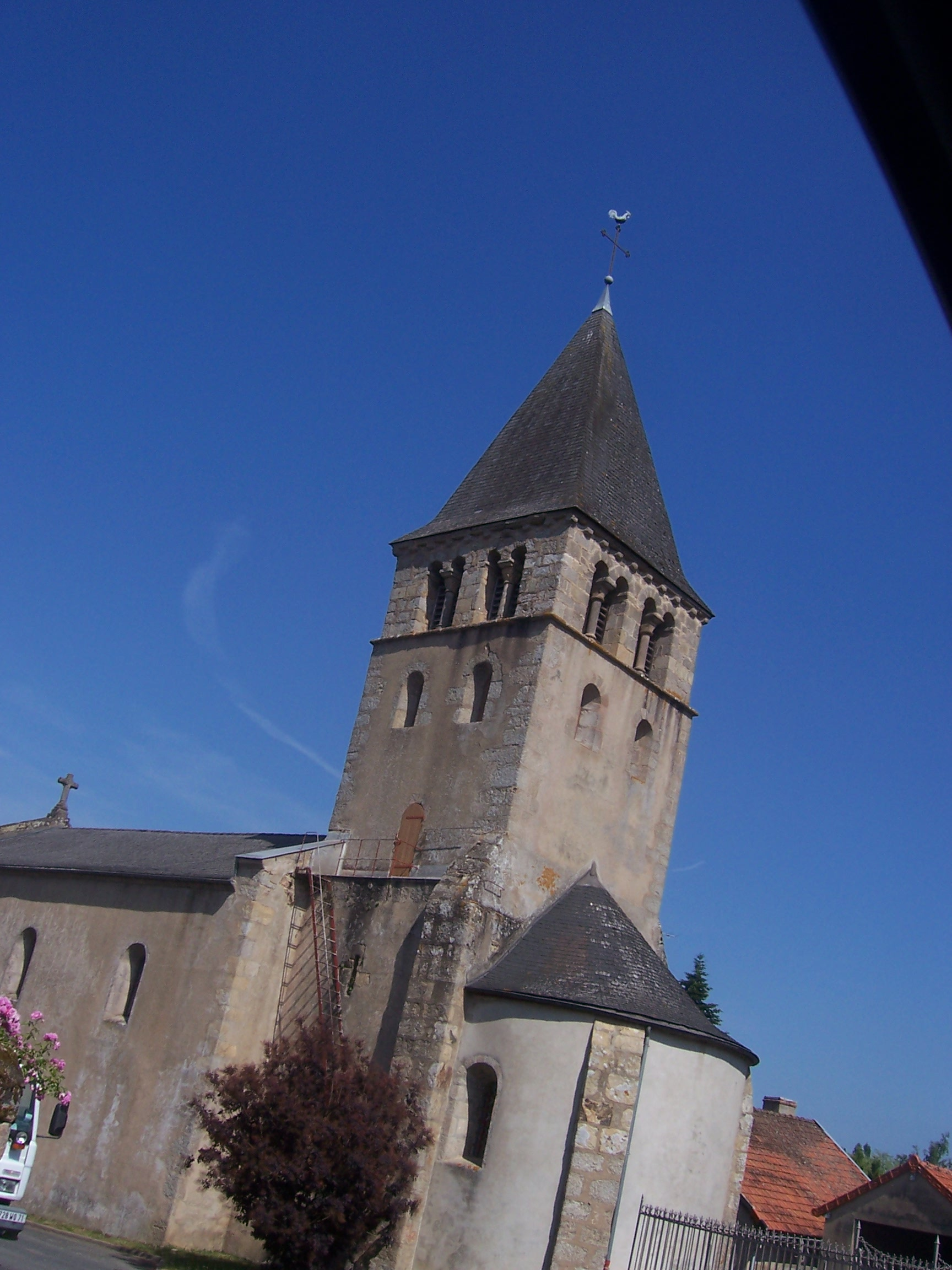
- The church in Dettey
- Location of Dettey
- Location within France Location within Bourgogne-Franche-Comté
- Coordinates: 46°45′51″N 4°11′01″E
- Country: France
- Region: Bourgogne-Franche-Comté
- Department: Saône-et-Loire
- Arrondissement: Autun
- Canton: Autun-2
- Area^{1}: 22.5 km^{2} (8.7 sq mi)
- Elevation: 526 m (1,726 ft)
- Highest elevation: 530 m (1,740 ft)
- Lowest elevation: 274 m (899 ft)
- Population (2023): 88
  - Density: 3.9/km^{2} (10/sq mi)
- Time zone: UTC+01:00 (CET)
  - Summer (DST): UTC+02:00 (CEST)
- INSEE/Postal code: 71172 /71190
- ^{1} French Land Register data, which excludes lakes, ponds, glaciers > 1 km^{2} (0.386 sq mi or 247 acres) and river estuaries.

Dettey is a commune in the Saône-et-Loire department in the region of Bourgogne-Franche-Comté in eastern France.

== See also ==
- Communes of the Saône-et-Loire department
