= Saint-Martin-de-Commune =

- Commune
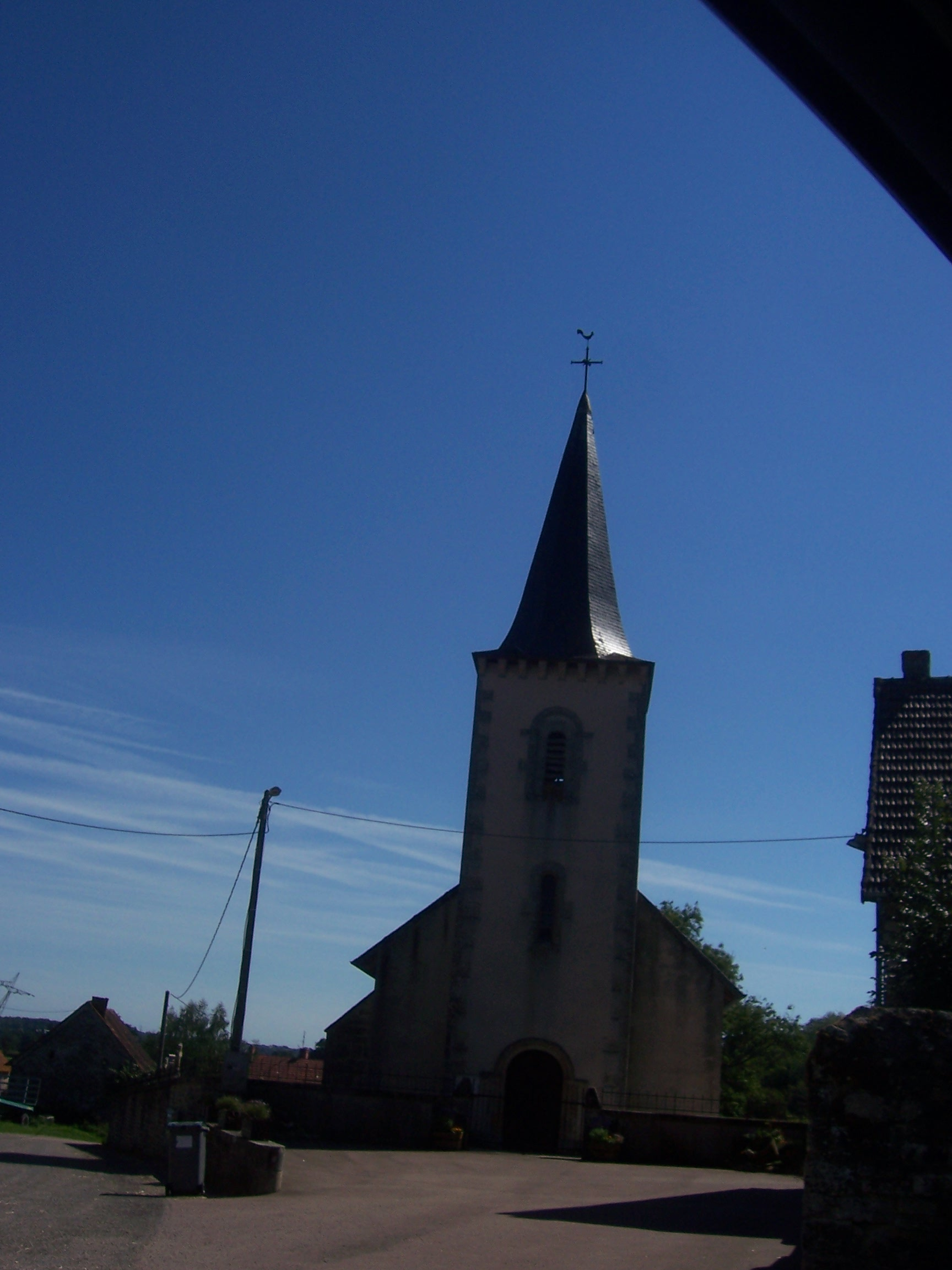
- The church in Saint-Martin-de-Commune
- Location of Saint-Martin-de-Commune
- Location within France Location within Bourgogne-Franche-Comté
- Coordinates: 46°55′04″N 4°30′11″E
- Country: France
- Region: Bourgogne-Franche-Comté
- Department: Saône-et-Loire
- Arrondissement: Autun
- Canton: Autun-2
- Intercommunality: Grand Autunois Morvan

Government
  - Mayor (2023–2026): Bruno Marechal
- Area^{1}: 14.57 km^{2} (5.63 sq mi)
- Elevation: 460 m (1,510 ft)
- Highest elevation: 464 m (1,522 ft)
- Lowest elevation: 363 m (1,191 ft)
- Population (2023): 101
  - Density: 6.93/km^{2} (18.0/sq mi)
- Time zone: UTC+01:00 (CET)
  - Summer (DST): UTC+02:00 (CEST)
- INSEE/Postal code: 71450 /71490
- ^{1} French Land Register data, which excludes lakes, ponds, glaciers > 1 km^{2} (0.386 sq mi or 247 acres) and river estuaries.

Saint-Martin-de-Commune (French pronunciation: [sɛ̃ maʁtɛ̃ də kɔmyn]) is a commune in the Saône-et-Loire department in the region of Bourgogne-Franche-Comté in eastern France.

== See also ==
- Communes of the Saône-et-Loire department
