= Canton of Autun-2 =

Coordinates: 46.94°N 4.30°E

The canton of Autun-2 is an administrative division of the Saône-et-Loire department, eastern France. It was created at the French canton reorganisation which came into effect in March 2015. Its seat is in Autun.

It consists of the following communes:

1. Antully
2. Autun (partly)
3. Auxy
4. La Boulaye
5. Brion
6. Broye
7. La Chapelle-sous-Uchon
8. Charbonnat
9. Charmoy
10. La Comelle
11. Dettey
12. Étang-sur-Arroux
13. La Grande-Verrière
14. Laizy
15. Marmagne
16. Mesvres
17. Saint-Didier-sur-Arroux
18. Saint-Émiland
19. Saint-Eugène
20. Saint-Léger-sous-Beuvray
21. Saint-Martin-de-Commune
22. Saint-Nizier-sur-Arroux
23. Saint-Prix
24. Saint-Symphorien-de-Marmagne
25. La Tagnière
26. Thil-sur-Arroux
27. Uchon
