= La Tagnière =

- Commune
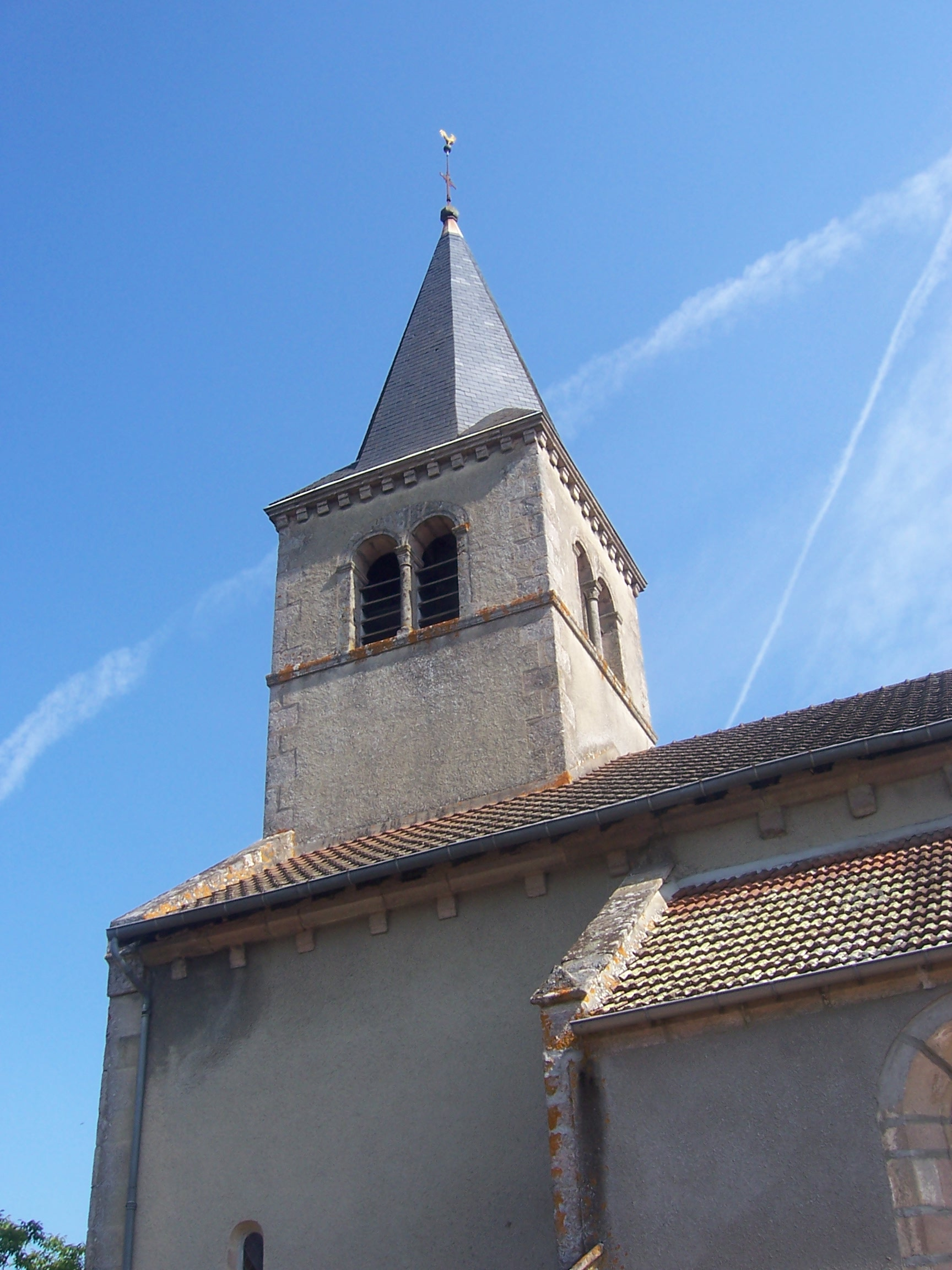
- The church in La Tagnière

- Coat of arms
- Location of La Tagnière
- Location within France Location within Bourgogne-Franche-Comté
- Coordinates: 46°47′22″N 4°12′59″E
- Country: France
- Region: Bourgogne-Franche-Comté
- Department: Saône-et-Loire
- Arrondissement: Autun
- Canton: Autun-2

Government
  - Mayor (2020–2026): Yannick Bouthiere
- Area^{1}: 34.07 km^{2} (13.15 sq mi)
- Elevation: 329 m (1,079 ft)
- Highest elevation: 654 m (2,146 ft)
- Lowest elevation: 276 m (906 ft)
- Population (2023): 209
  - Density: 6.13/km^{2} (15.9/sq mi)
- Time zone: UTC+01:00 (CET)
  - Summer (DST): UTC+02:00 (CEST)
- INSEE/Postal code: 71531 /71190
- ^{1} French Land Register data, which excludes lakes, ponds, glaciers > 1 km^{2} (0.386 sq mi or 247 acres) and river estuaries.

La Tagnière (French pronunciation: [la taɲɛʁ]) is a commune in the Saône-et-Loire department in the region of Bourgogne-Franche-Comté in eastern France.

== See also ==
- Communes of the Saône-et-Loire department
