= La Grande-Verrière =

- Commune
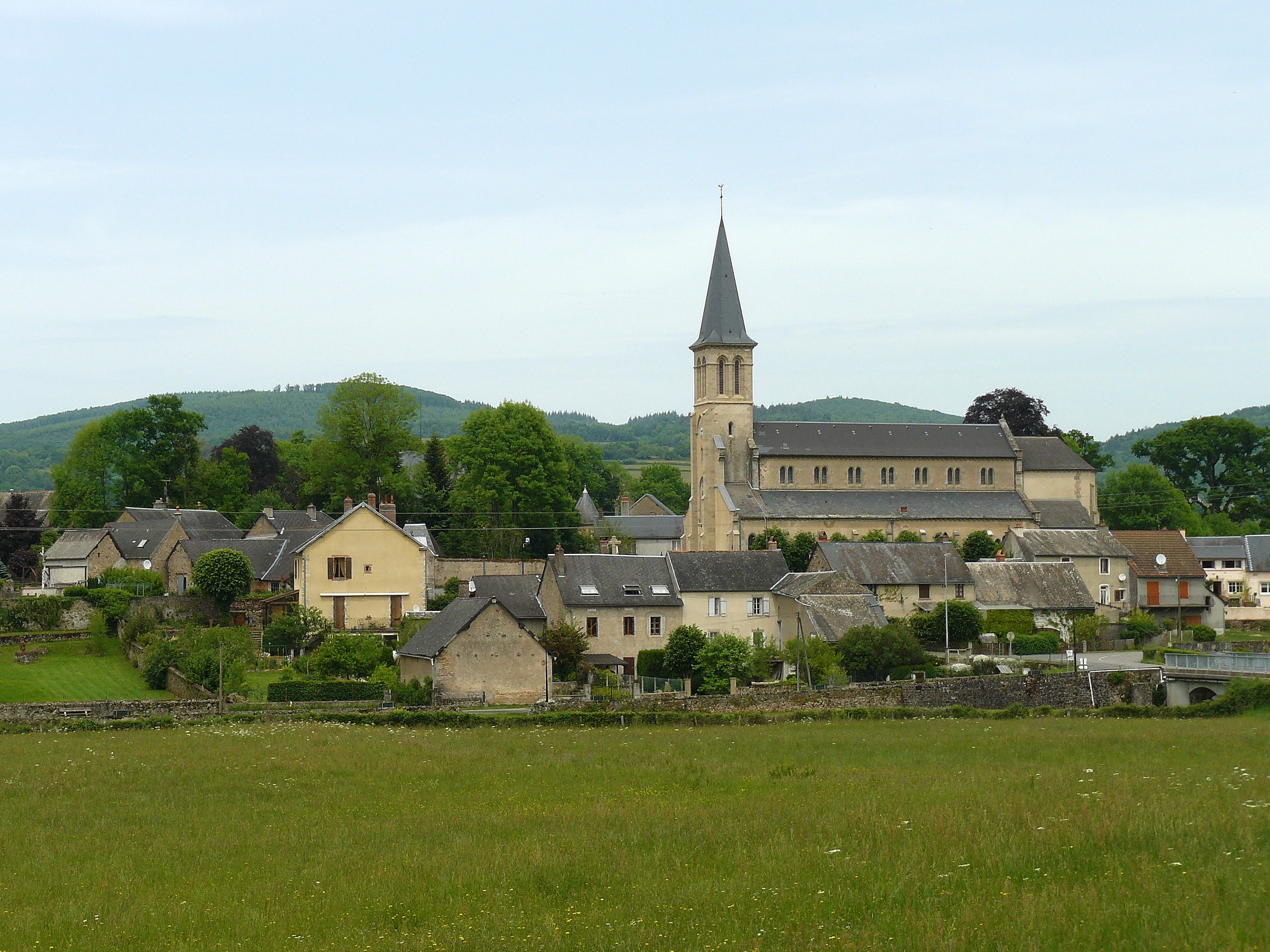
- A general view of La Grande-Verrière
- Location of La Grande-Verrière
- Location within France Location within Bourgogne-Franche-Comté
- Coordinates: 46°57′56″N 4°08′28″E
- Country: France
- Region: Bourgogne-Franche-Comté
- Department: Saône-et-Loire
- Arrondissement: Autun
- Canton: Autun-2
- Area^{1}: 46.54 km^{2} (17.97 sq mi)
- Elevation: 350 m (1,150 ft)
- Highest elevation: 715 m (2,346 ft)
- Lowest elevation: 292 m (958 ft)
- Population (2023): 542
  - Density: 11.6/km^{2} (30.2/sq mi)
- Time zone: UTC+01:00 (CET)
  - Summer (DST): UTC+02:00 (CEST)
- INSEE/Postal code: 71223 /71990
- ^{1} French Land Register data, which excludes lakes, ponds, glaciers > 1 km^{2} (0.386 sq mi or 247 acres) and river estuaries.

La Grande-Verrière is a commune in the Saône-et-Loire department in the region of Bourgogne-Franche-Comté in eastern France.

== See also ==
- Communes of the Saône-et-Loire department
- Parc naturel régional du Morvan
