= Saint-Émiland =

- Commune
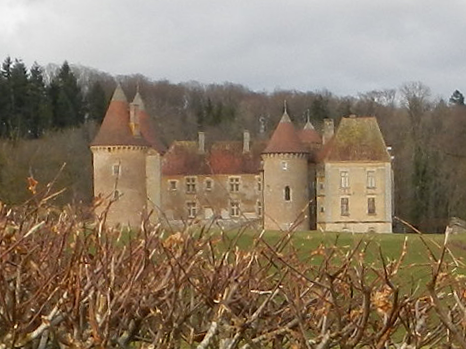
- Chateau
- Location of Saint-Émiland
- Location within France Location within Bourgogne-Franche-Comté
- Coordinates: 46°54′18″N 4°29′06″E
- Country: France
- Region: Bourgogne-Franche-Comté
- Department: Saône-et-Loire
- Arrondissement: Autun
- Canton: Autun-2
- Area^{1}: 23.9 km^{2} (9.2 sq mi)
- Elevation: 442 m (1,450 ft)
- Highest elevation: 548 m (1,798 ft)
- Lowest elevation: 393 m (1,289 ft)
- Population (2023): 317
  - Density: 13.3/km^{2} (34.4/sq mi)
- Time zone: UTC+01:00 (CET)
  - Summer (DST): UTC+02:00 (CEST)
- INSEE/Postal code: 71409 /71490
- ^{1} French Land Register data, which excludes lakes, ponds, glaciers > 1 km^{2} (0.386 sq mi or 247 acres) and river estuaries.

Saint-Émiland (French pronunciation: [sɛ̃.t‿emilɑ̃]) is a commune in the Saône-et-Loire department in the region of Bourgogne-Franche-Comté in eastern France. It is named after Émilien of Nantes.

== See also ==
- Communes of the Saône-et-Loire department
