= Brion, Saône-et-Loire =

Brion
- Commune
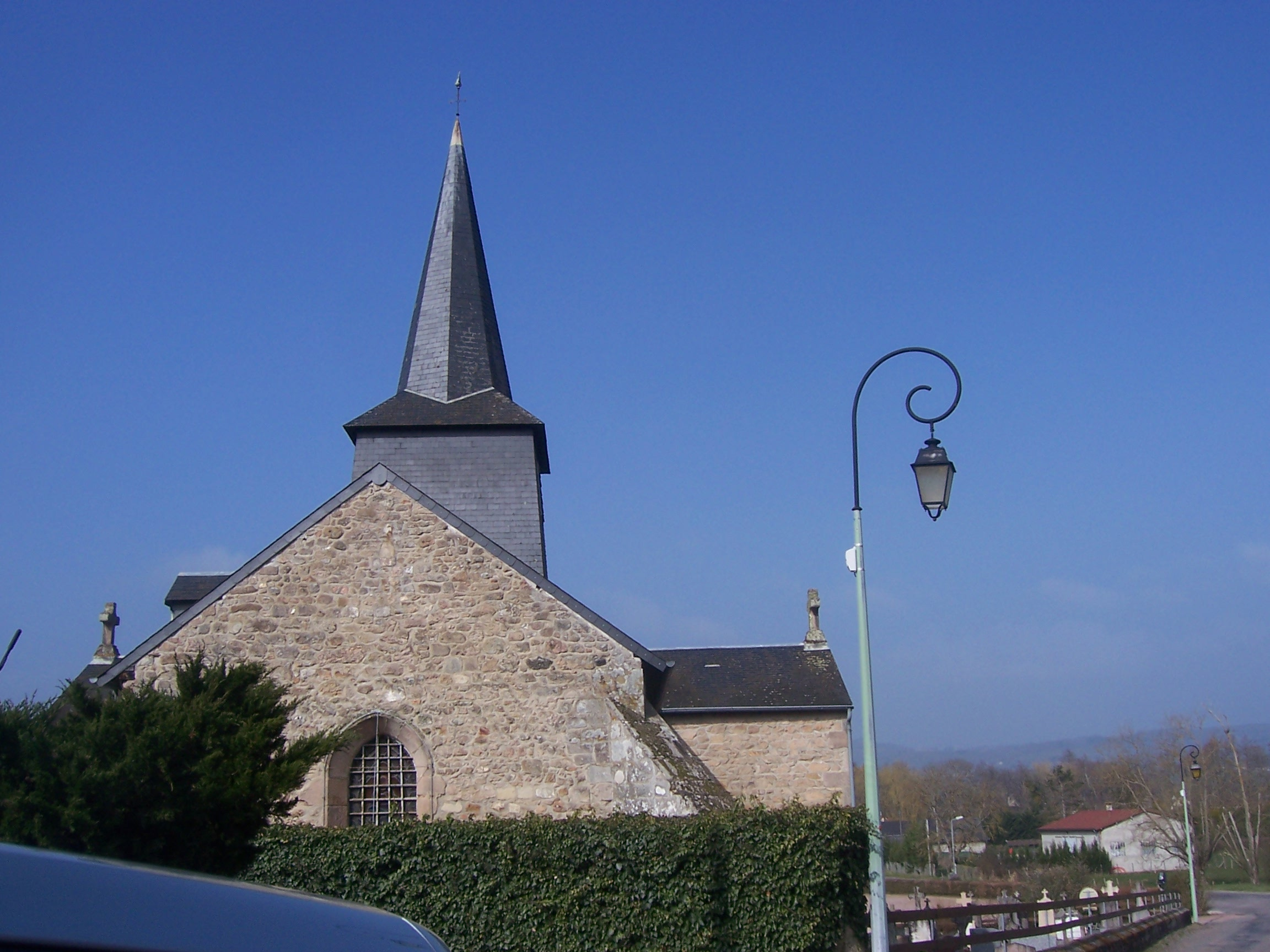
- The church in Brion
- Location of Brion
- Location within France Location within Bourgogne-Franche-Comté
- Coordinates: 46°54′36″N 4°13′42″E
- Country: France
- Region: Bourgogne-Franche-Comté
- Department: Saône-et-Loire
- Arrondissement: Autun
- Canton: Autun-2
- Area^{1}: 16.57 km^{2} (6.40 sq mi)
- Elevation: 282 m (925 ft)
- Highest elevation: 654 m (2,146 ft)
- Lowest elevation: 279 m (915 ft)
- Population (2023): 303
  - Density: 18.3/km^{2} (47.4/sq mi)
- Time zone: UTC+01:00 (CET)
  - Summer (DST): UTC+02:00 (CEST)
- INSEE/Postal code: 71062 /71190
- ^{1} French Land Register data, which excludes lakes, ponds, glaciers > 1 km^{2} (0.386 sq mi or 247 acres) and river estuaries.

Brion (French pronunciation: [bʁijɔ̃]) is a commune in the Saône-et-Loire department in the region of Bourgogne-Franche-Comté in eastern France.

== See also ==
- Communes of the Saône-et-Loire department
