= Laizy =

- Commune
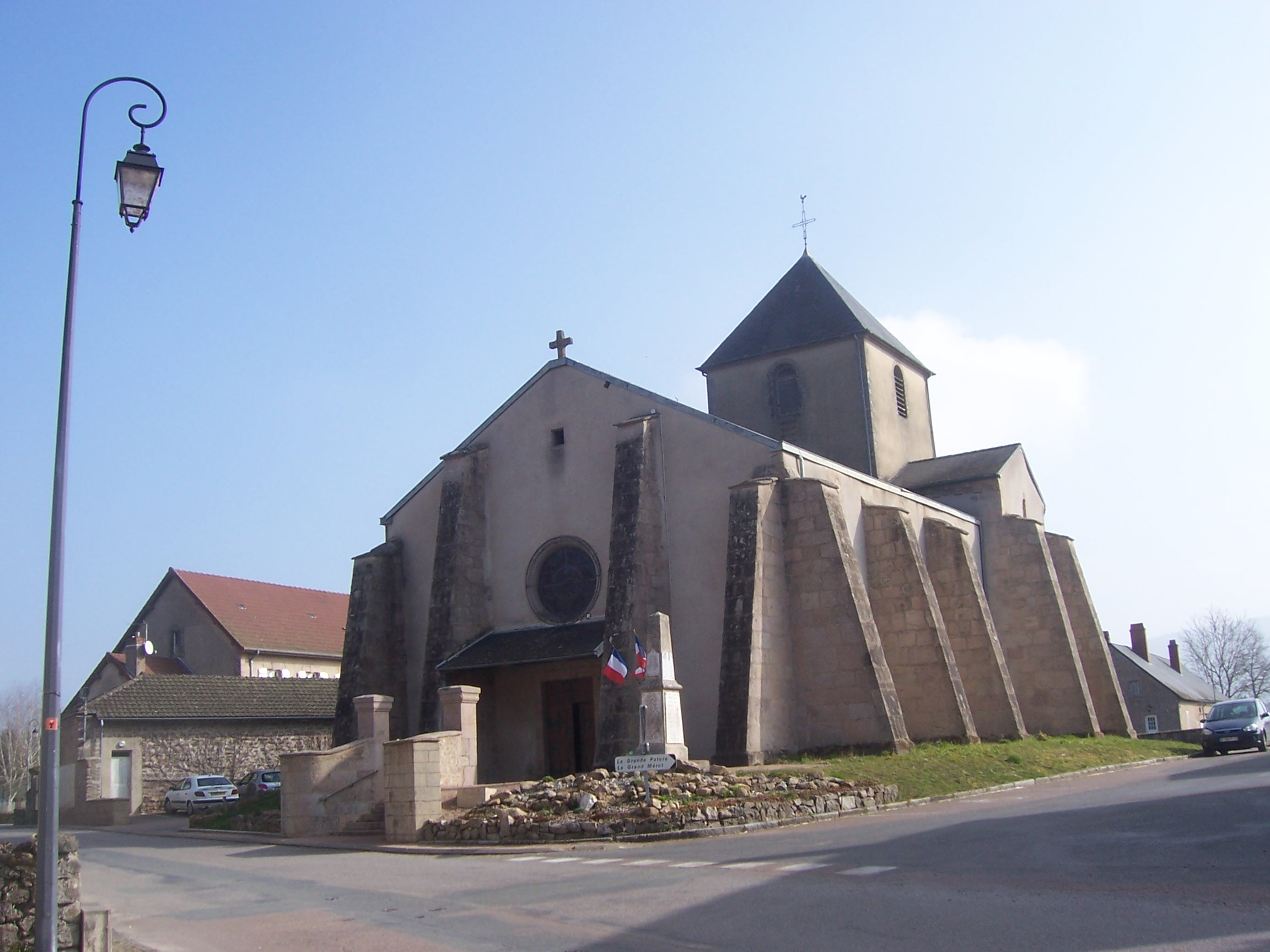
- The church in Laizy
- Location of Laizy
- Location within France Location within Bourgogne-Franche-Comté
- Coordinates: 46°54′32″N 4°12′04″E
- Country: France
- Region: Bourgogne-Franche-Comté
- Department: Saône-et-Loire
- Arrondissement: Autun
- Canton: Autun-2
- Area^{1}: 31.18 km^{2} (12.04 sq mi)
- Elevation: 282 m (925 ft)
- Highest elevation: 500 m (1,600 ft)
- Lowest elevation: 270 m (890 ft)
- Population (2023): 599
  - Density: 19.2/km^{2} (49.8/sq mi)
- Time zone: UTC+01:00 (CET)
  - Summer (DST): UTC+02:00 (CEST)
- INSEE/Postal code: 71251 /71190
- ^{1} French Land Register data, which excludes lakes, ponds, glaciers > 1 km^{2} (0.386 sq mi or 247 acres) and river estuaries.

Laizy (French pronunciation: [lɛzi]) is a commune in the Saône-et-Loire department in the region of Bourgogne-Franche-Comté in eastern France.

== See also ==
- Communes of the Saône-et-Loire department
