= Auxy, Saône-et-Loire =

Auxy
- Commune
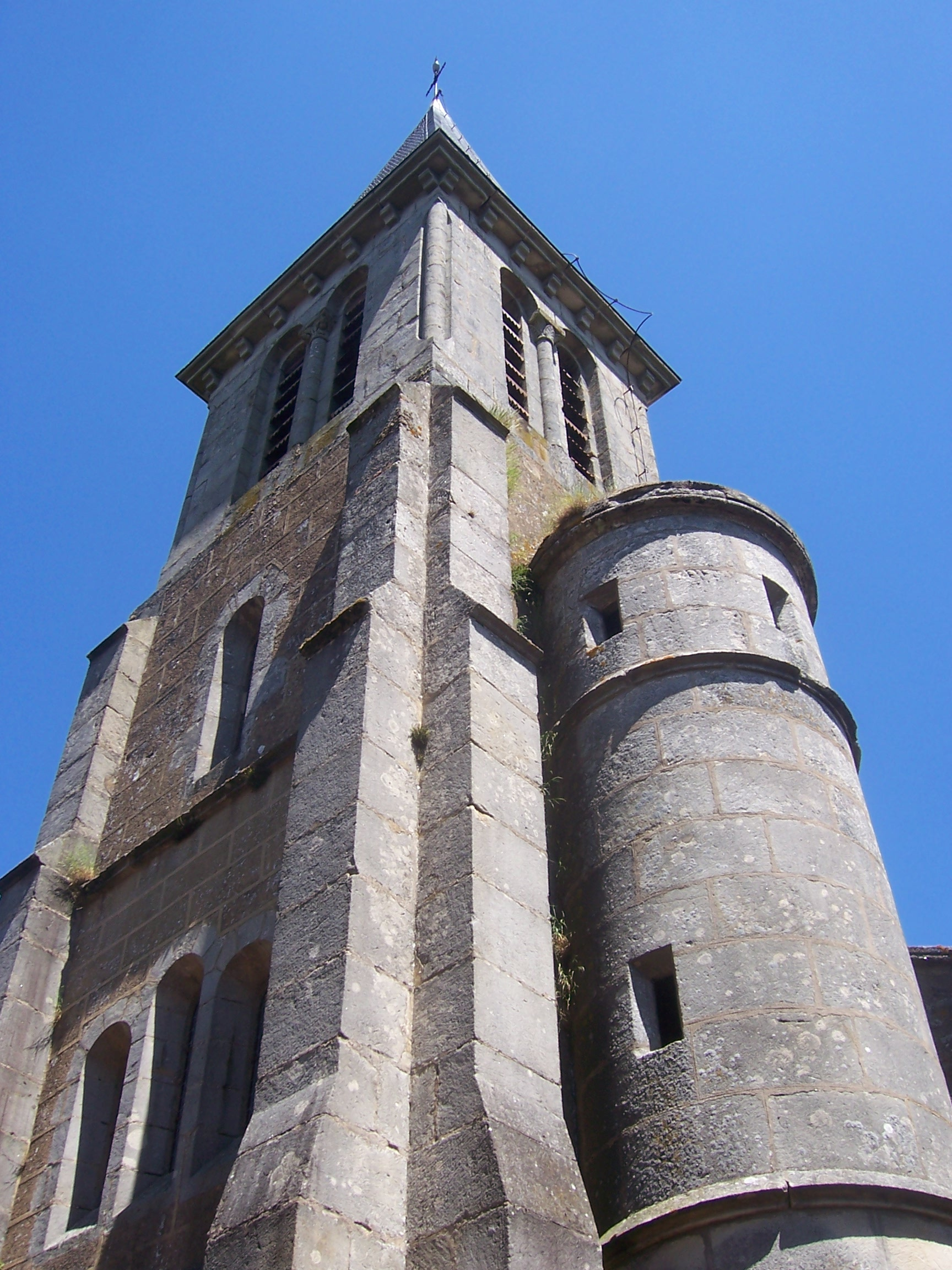
- Location of Auxy
- Location within France Location within Bourgogne-Franche-Comté
- Coordinates: 46°57′00″N 4°24′11″E
- Country: France
- Region: Bourgogne-Franche-Comté
- Department: Saône-et-Loire
- Arrondissement: Autun
- Canton: Autun-2
- Intercommunality: CC Grand Autunois Morvan

Government
  - Mayor (2020–2026): Stéphane Favre
- Area^{1}: 36.98 km^{2} (14.28 sq mi)
- Elevation: 527 m (1,729 ft)
- Highest elevation: 572 m (1,877 ft)
- Lowest elevation: 344 m (1,129 ft)
- Population (2023): 915
  - Density: 24.7/km^{2} (64.1/sq mi)
- Time zone: UTC+01:00 (CET)
  - Summer (DST): UTC+02:00 (CEST)
- INSEE/Postal code: 71015 /71400
- ^{1} French Land Register data, which excludes lakes, ponds, glaciers > 1 km^{2} (0.386 sq mi or 247 acres) and river estuaries.

Auxy is a commune in the Saône-et-Loire department in the region of Bourgogne-Franche-Comté in eastern France.

== Geography ==
The commune lies in the northwest of the department near Autun.

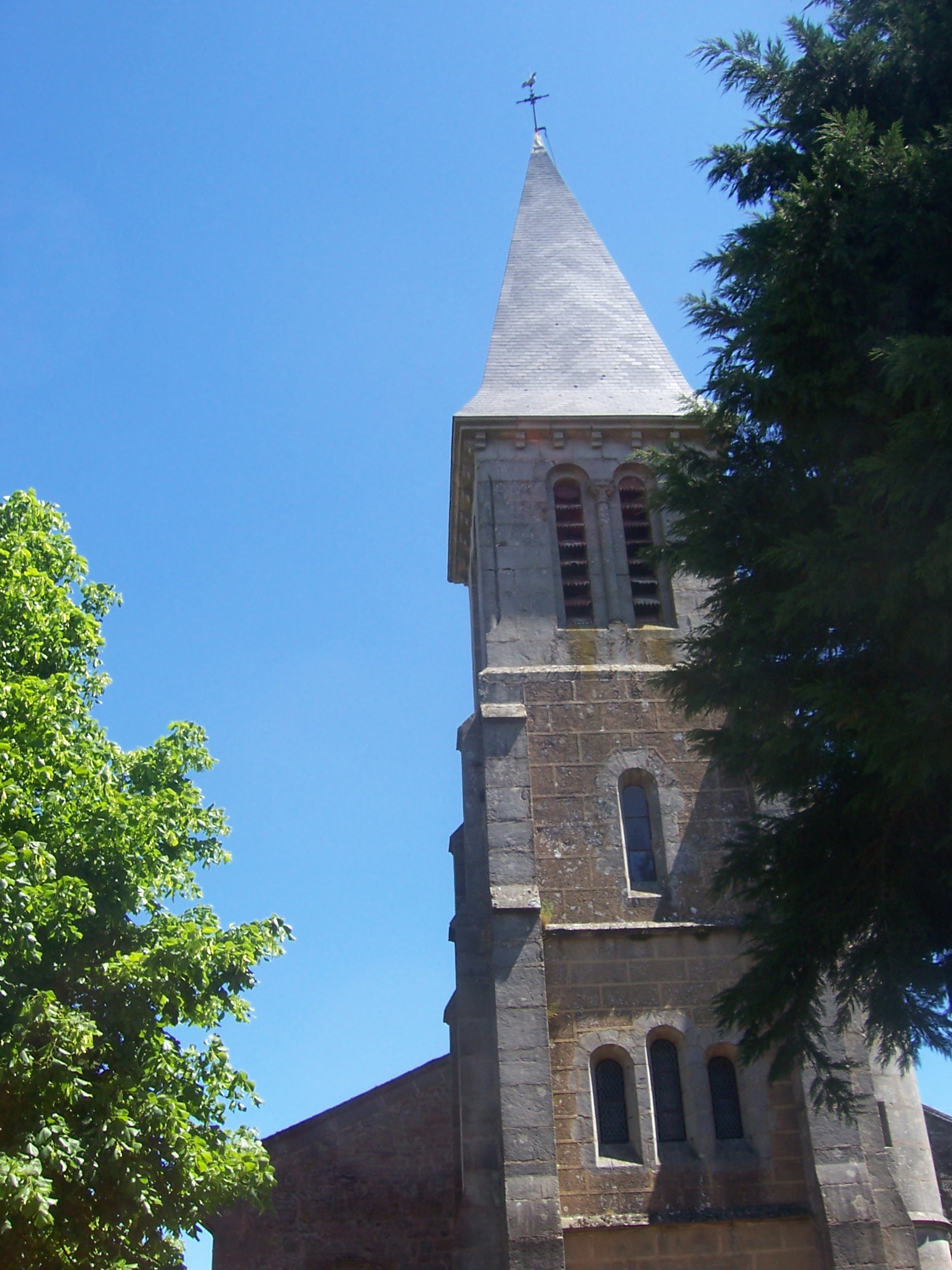
Belfry

== Population ==
Historical population
Year	Pop.	±% p.a.
1968	557	—
1975	536	−0.55%
1982	763	+5.17%
1990	1,037	+3.91%
1999	1,048	+0.12%
2007	993	−0.67%
2012	982	−0.22%
2017	934	−1.00%
2023	915	−0.34%
Source: INSEE

== See also ==
- Communes of the Saône-et-Loire department
