= Broye, Saône-et-Loire =

Broye
- Commune
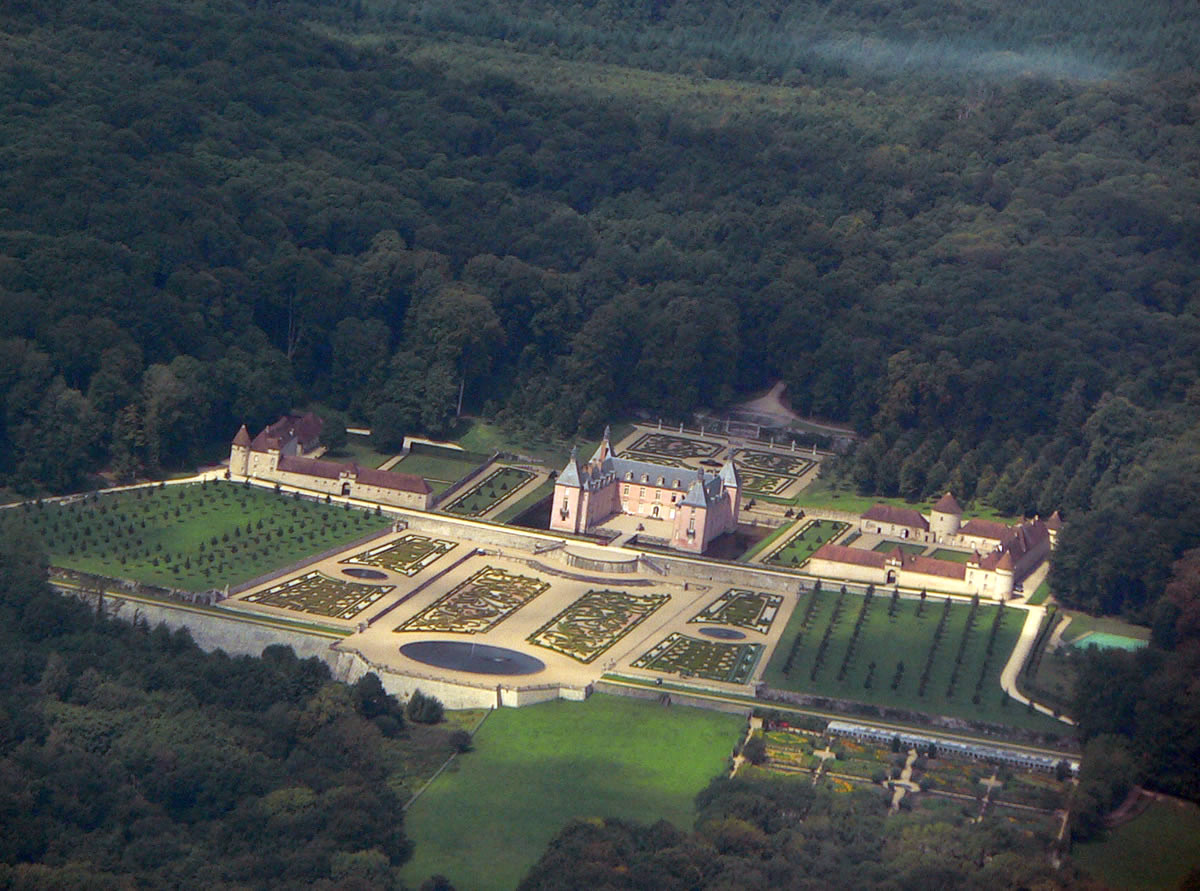
- Château de Montjeu at Broye
- Location of Broye
- Location within France Location within Bourgogne-Franche-Comté
- Coordinates: 46°52′20″N 4°17′27″E
- Country: France
- Region: Bourgogne-Franche-Comté
- Department: Saône-et-Loire
- Arrondissement: Autun
- Canton: Autun-2
- Intercommunality: Grand Autunois Morvan
- Area^{1}: 28.39 km^{2} (10.96 sq mi)
- Elevation: 295 m (968 ft)
- Highest elevation: 664 m (2,178 ft)
- Lowest elevation: 289 m (948 ft)
- Population (2023): 760
  - Density: 27/km^{2} (69/sq mi)
- Time zone: UTC+01:00 (CET)
  - Summer (DST): UTC+02:00 (CEST)
- INSEE/Postal code: 71063 /71190
- ^{1} French Land Register data, which excludes lakes, ponds, glaciers > 1 km^{2} (0.386 sq mi or 247 acres) and river estuaries.

Broye (French pronunciation: [bʁwa]) is a commune in the Saône-et-Loire department in the region of Bourgogne-Franche-Comté in eastern France.

== See also ==
- Communes of the Saône-et-Loire department
