= Saint-Léger-sous-Beuvray =

- Commune
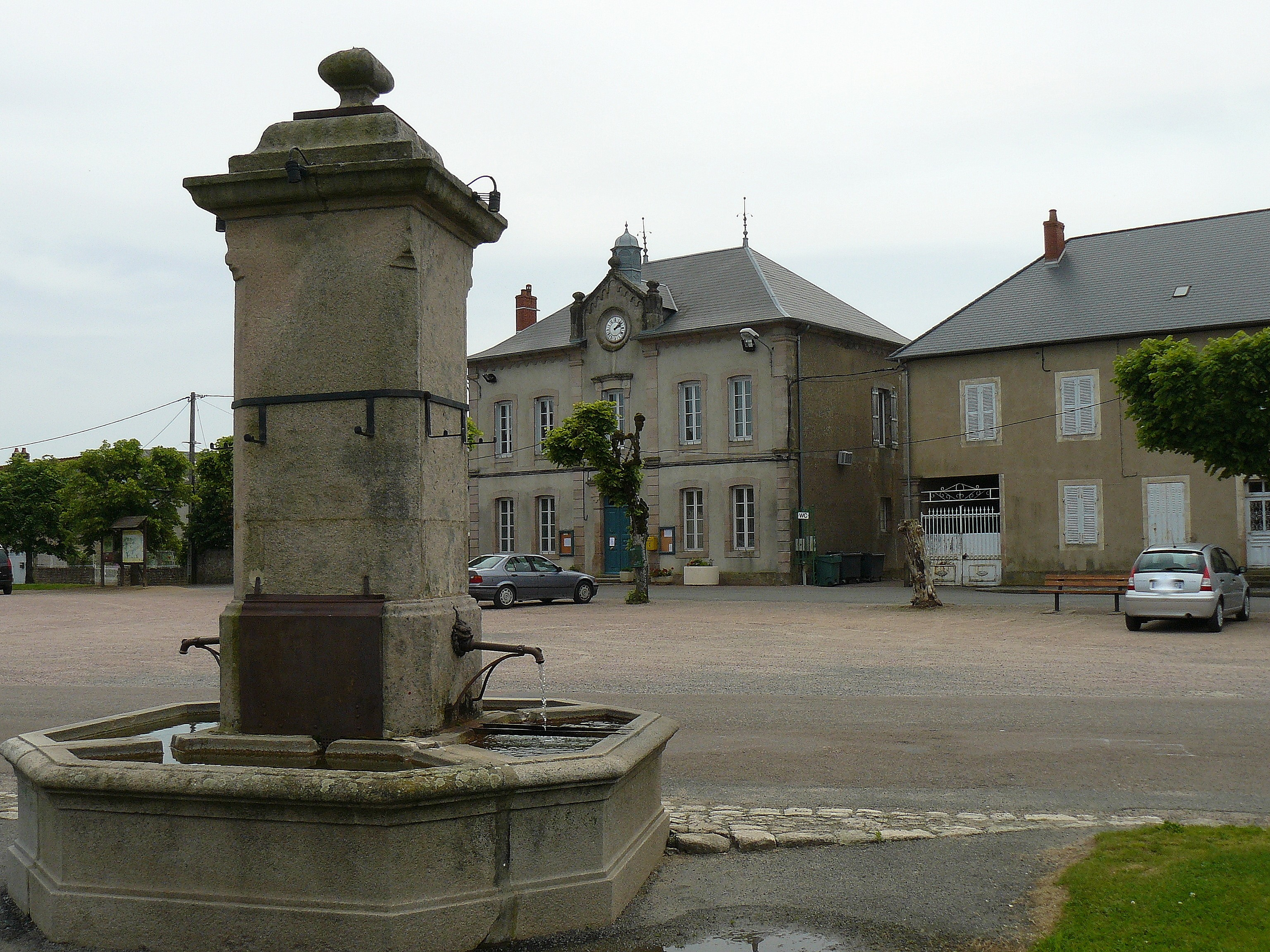
- The town hall and surroundings in Saint-Léger-sous-Beuvray
- Location of Saint-Léger-sous-Beuvray
- Location within France Location within Bourgogne-Franche-Comté
- Coordinates: 46°55′27″N 4°06′07″E
- Country: France
- Region: Bourgogne-Franche-Comté
- Department: Saône-et-Loire
- Arrondissement: Autun
- Canton: Autun-2
- Area^{1}: 34.97 km^{2} (13.50 sq mi)
- Elevation: 390 m (1,280 ft)
- Highest elevation: 821 m (2,694 ft)
- Lowest elevation: 294 m (965 ft)
- Population (2023): 369
  - Density: 10.6/km^{2} (27.3/sq mi)
- Time zone: UTC+01:00 (CET)
  - Summer (DST): UTC+02:00 (CEST)
- INSEE/Postal code: 71440 /71990
- ^{1} French Land Register data, which excludes lakes, ponds, glaciers > 1 km^{2} (0.386 sq mi or 247 acres) and river estuaries.

Saint-Léger-sous-Beuvray (French pronunciation: [sɛ̃ leʒe su bøvʁɛ]) is a commune in the Saône-et-Loire department in the region of Bourgogne-Franche-Comté in eastern France.

== See also ==
- Communes of the Saône-et-Loire department
- Parc naturel régional du Morvan
