= Émilien of Nantes =

Bishop of Nantes
- Hometown: Nantes, Brittany
- Died: c. 725; Autun, France
- Beatified: 1856, Autun by Eastern Orthodox Church; Roman Catholic Church
- Feast: Sunday after feast of Saint John the Baptist

Émilien of Nantes (Latin: Aemilianus; died c. 725) was a French religious leader who was canonized by the church as a martyr for dying in a fight against the Saracens in Burgundy in 725 AD. No written records earlier than the 16th century survive, and there are no records of a Bishop Émilien of Nantes. The legend probably has its roots in a real clash with the Saracens, who were present in the region at the time, but has been considerably embroidered.

== Legend ==
There are no written records of the story of Saint Émiland before the 16th century, only an oral tradition of a warrior bishop who came from Brittany with an army to fight the Saracens, met them at Saint-Jean-de-Luze, near Autun, died there after a bloody battle, and was buried there with his companions in stone coffins that fell from the sky. This bishop was called "Millan" by the local people.

The story as it is told now is that Émilien was Bishop of Nantes when the Saracens crossed the Pyrenees mountains into what is now France. Hearing of the advance of the Saracens, he gathered a crowd of the faithful in Nantes to fight against the infidel. He sailed up the Loire from Nantes and past the Morvan to Autun. The Saracens numbered 26,000 cavalry and numerous foot soldiers. They advanced to Autun and laid siege to the town. Émilien led his forces and the people of the town against the attackers. He was victorious at first, but the tide turned and after a valiant struggle he was killed at the head of his forces. The Saracens cut off his head. He was buried in the village now called Saint-Émiland.

== First written records ==
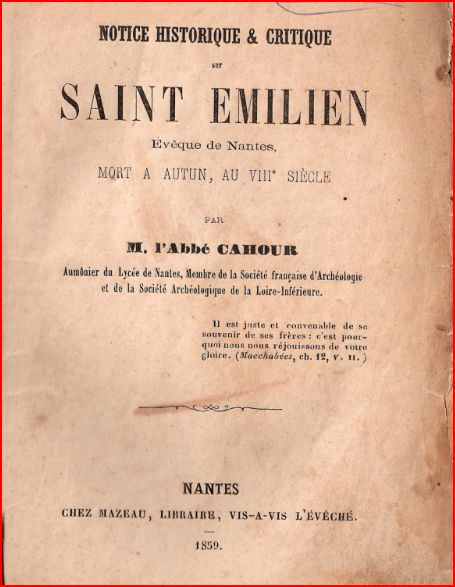

During the episcopate of Jacques Hurault of Autun (1512–1546) a brotherhood was founded under the patronage of Saint Émiland, and the village of Saint-Jean-de-Luze was renamed Saint-Émiland. A festival was fixed for the Sunday following the feast of Saint John the Baptist. Saint Aemiliani is first mentioned in a Missal of 1556, which describes him as a bishop but does not name his see. There are no records of a bishop by that name in Nantes.

A set of verses and prayers was composed by Étienne Chaffault in 1592 for services in Autun Cathedral. It names the saint as Bishop of Nantes and describes his decision to fight the Saracens, the battle and his death. The work was translated from Latin into French, with some details added, and printed in 1607. It omits the story of the coffins falling from the sky. The local people told the story, including the falling coffins, to the Benedictine Jean Mabillon in 1682 when he visited the village and was struck by the number of stone coffins in the local graveyard.

== Later developments ==
Émilien was little known in the diocese of Nantes until the 19th century. The bishop of Nantes, Alexandre Jaquemet, managed to have the saint reintroduced in the liturgical calendar with the blessing of Pope Pius IX. On 6 November 1859 the relics of the saint were taken to Nantes in a solemn ceremony. That year the Abbé Cahour published a book named Notice historique et critique sur saint Emilien, évêque de Nantes that gives a very complete account of what is known or conjectured about the saint's life.

The parish of Saint-Émilien-de-Blain near Nantes is now named after the saint, as is Saint-Émiland, Saône et Loire, near Autun. There is also a Saint-Émiland near Tonnerre, Yonne. Nantes has a short street named Rue de l'Évêque Émilien between the Place des Enfants Nantais and the Rue Général Buat. In March 2012 it was reported that the Society of St. Pius X was planning to build a large new church in Nantes dedicated to Saint-Émilien.

The saint is thought to help cure headaches, kidney stones and hernias.
