= Saint-Eugène, Saône-et-Loire =

Saint-Eugène
- Commune
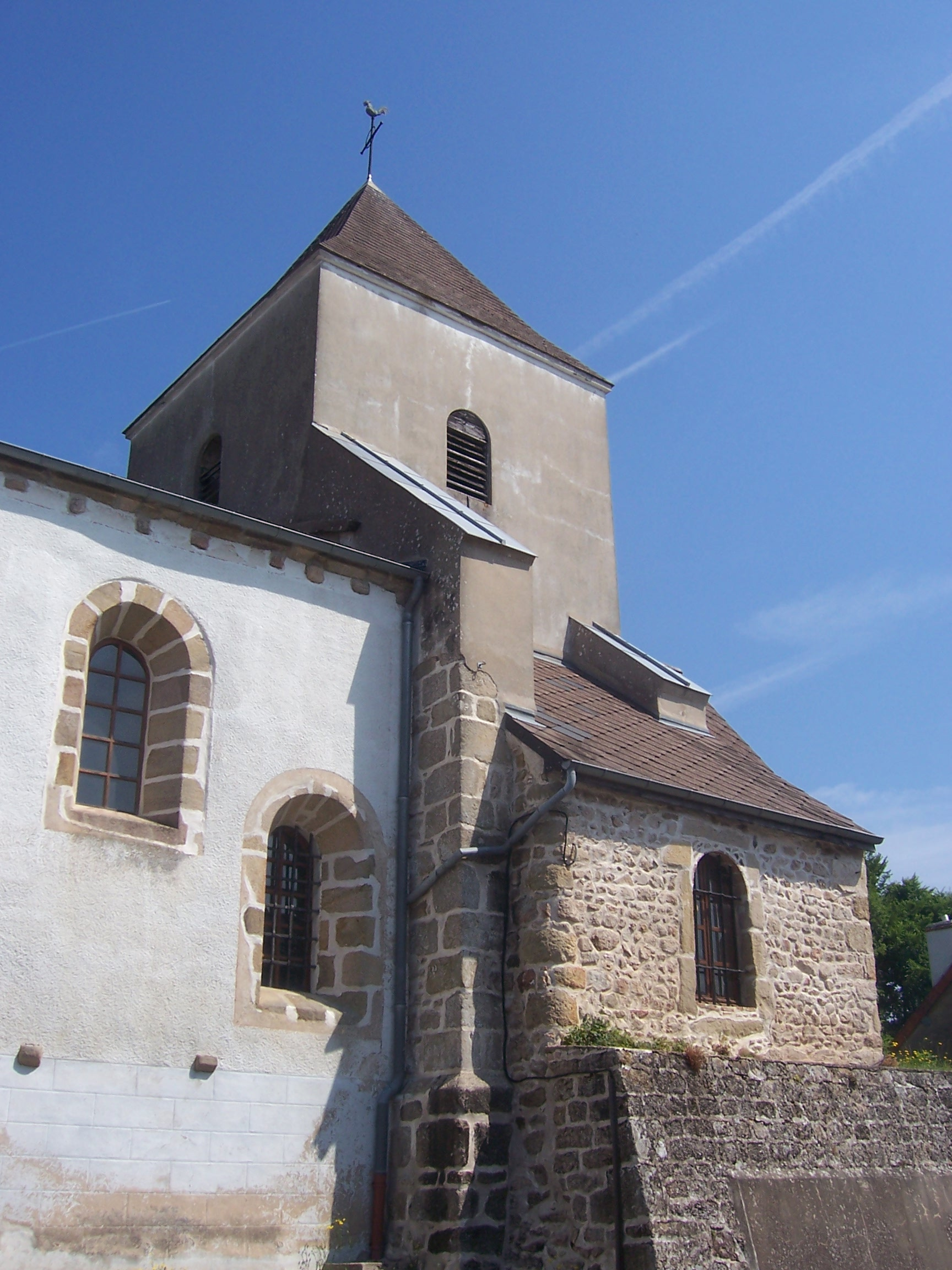
- The church in Saint-Eugène
- Location of Saint-Eugène
- Location within France Location within Bourgogne-Franche-Comté
- Coordinates: 46°44′17″N 4°11′41″E
- Country: France
- Region: Bourgogne-Franche-Comté
- Department: Saône-et-Loire
- Arrondissement: Autun
- Canton: Autun-2

Government
  - Mayor (2020–2026): Xavier Duvignaud
- Area^{1}: 35.27 km^{2} (13.62 sq mi)
- Elevation: 352 m (1,155 ft)
- Highest elevation: 554 m (1,818 ft)
- Lowest elevation: 264 m (866 ft)
- Population (2023): 150
  - Density: 4.3/km^{2} (11/sq mi)
- Time zone: UTC+01:00 (CET)
  - Summer (DST): UTC+02:00 (CEST)
- INSEE/Postal code: 71411 /71190
- ^{1} French Land Register data, which excludes lakes, ponds, glaciers > 1 km^{2} (0.386 sq mi or 247 acres) and river estuaries.

Saint-Eugène (French pronunciation: [sɛ̃t‿øʒɛn]) is a commune in the Saône-et-Loire department in the region of Bourgogne-Franche-Comté in eastern France.

== See also ==
- Communes of the Saône-et-Loire department
