= Mesvres =

- Commune
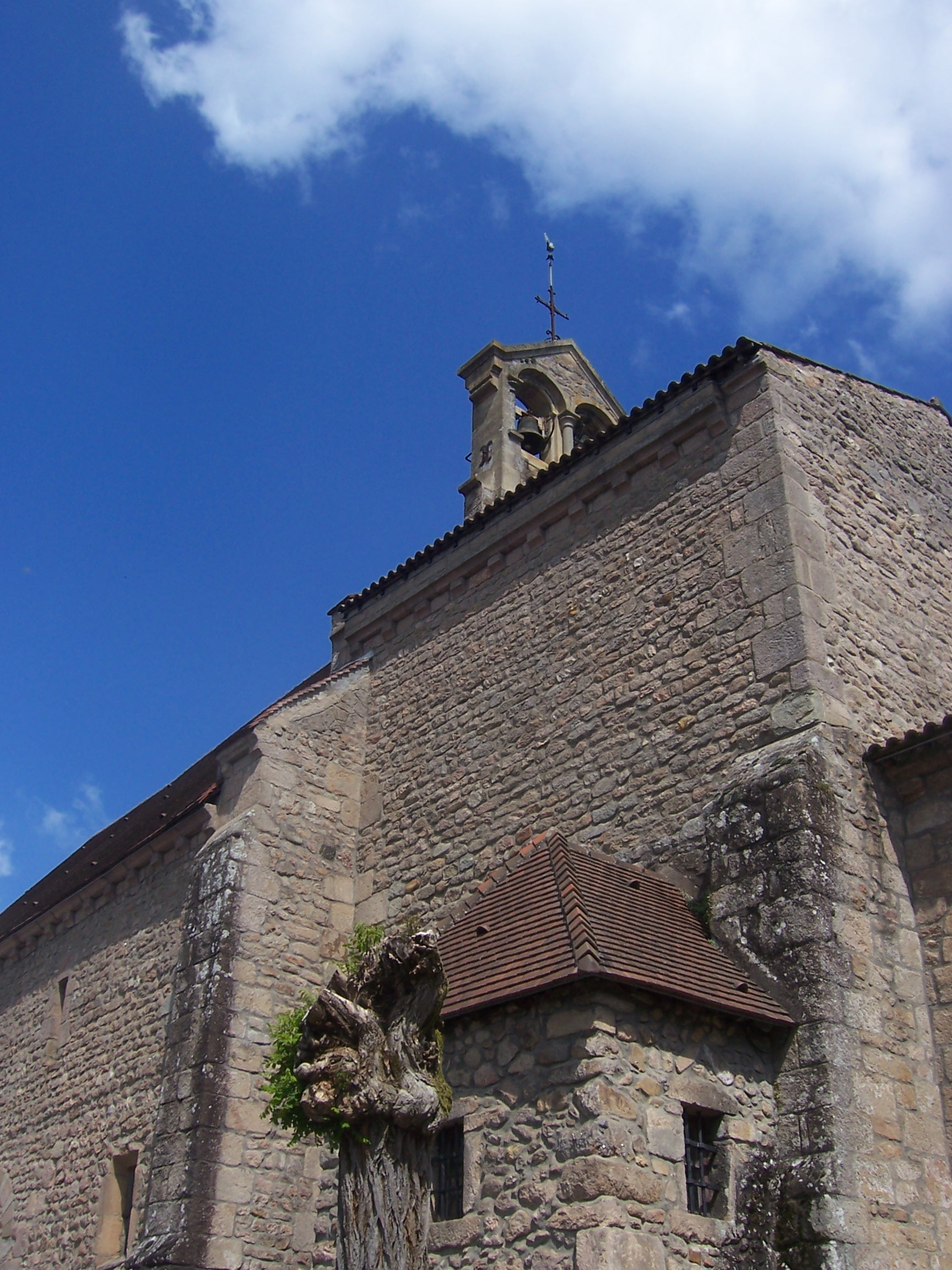
- The church in Mesvres
- Location of Mesvres
- Location within France Location within Bourgogne-Franche-Comté
- Coordinates: 46°51′47″N 4°14′33″E
- Country: France
- Region: Bourgogne-Franche-Comté
- Department: Saône-et-Loire
- Arrondissement: Autun
- Canton: Autun-2

Government
  - Mayor (2024–2026): Hervé Moutarde
- Area^{1}: 23.46 km^{2} (9.06 sq mi)
- Elevation: 288 m (945 ft)
- Highest elevation: 645 m (2,116 ft)
- Lowest elevation: 273 m (896 ft)
- Population (2023): 749
  - Density: 31.9/km^{2} (82.7/sq mi)
- Time zone: UTC+01:00 (CET)
  - Summer (DST): UTC+02:00 (CEST)
- INSEE/Postal code: 71297 /71190
- ^{1} French Land Register data, which excludes lakes, ponds, glaciers > 1 km^{2} (0.386 sq mi or 247 acres) and river estuaries.

Mesvres (French pronunciation: [mɛvʁ]) is a commune in the Saône-et-Loire department in the region of Bourgogne-Franche-Comté in eastern France.

== History ==
The bishops of Autun receive Charles the Bald the seat of a priory located in Mesvres. The priory was surrendered in 994 to the Abbey of Cluny. Pierre de Beaufort, prior of Mesvres in 1357, was the last French Pope (Gregory XI) in Avignon.

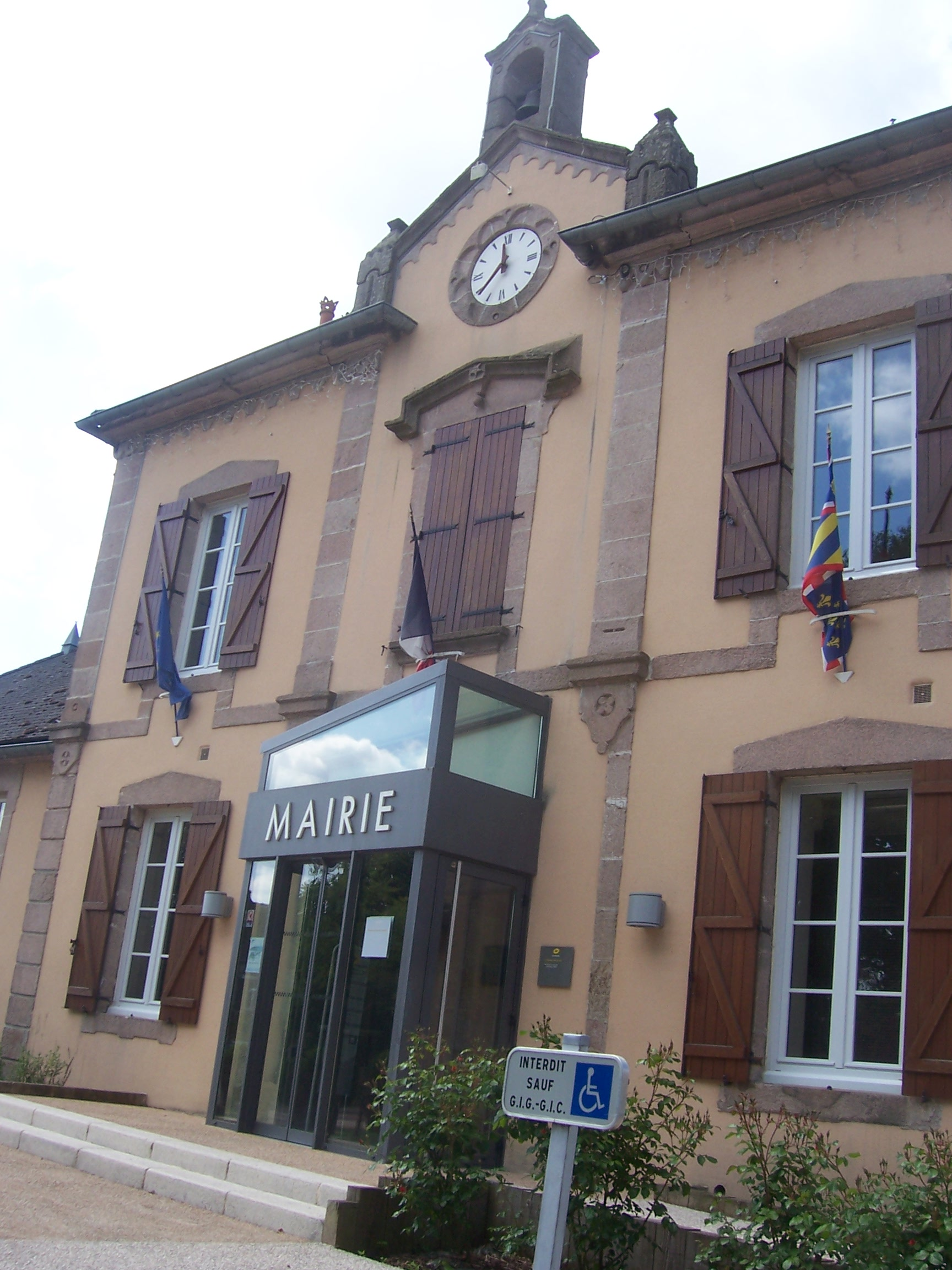
Town hall

== See also ==
- Communes of the Saône-et-Loire department
