= La Comelle =

- Commune
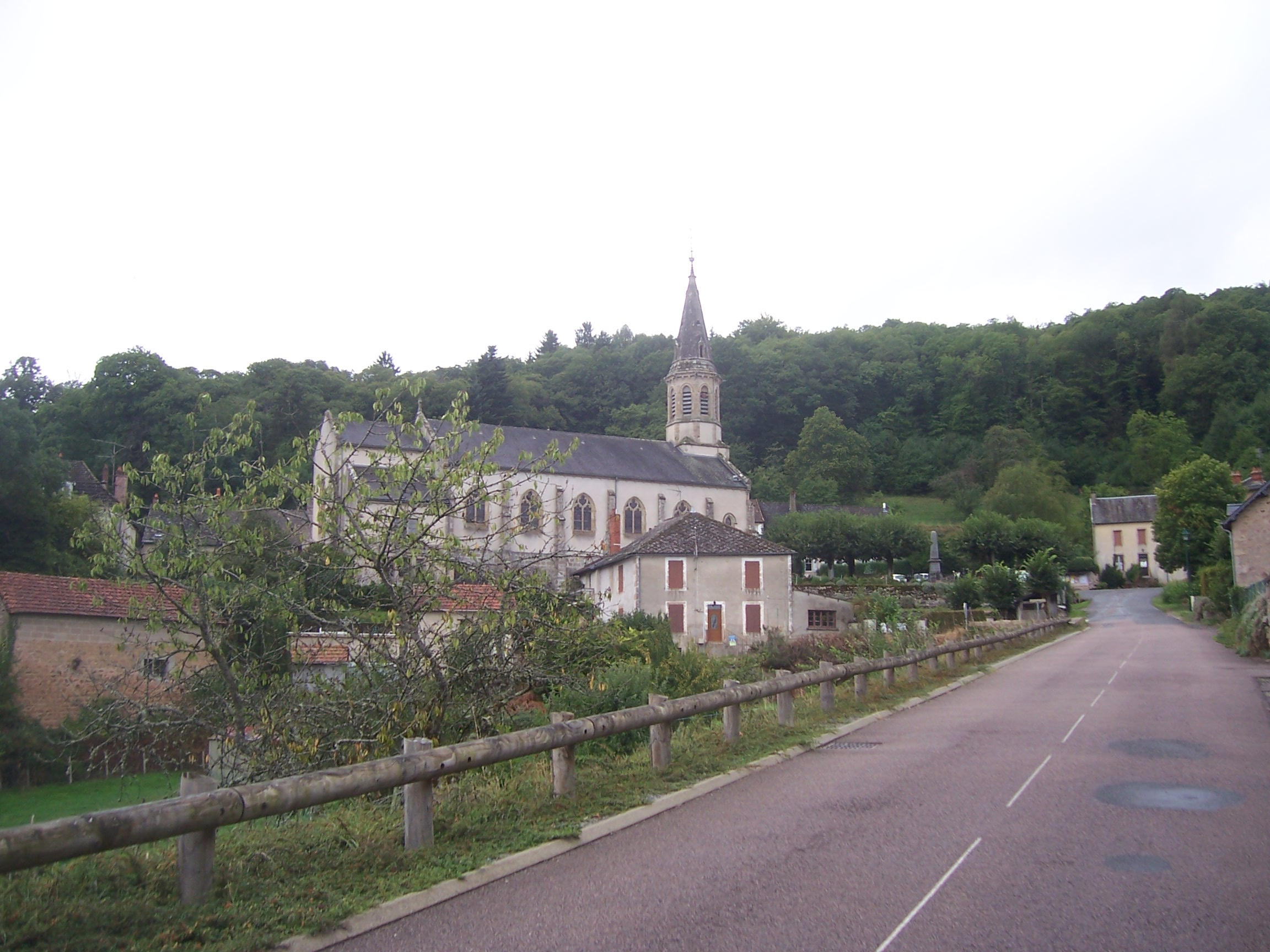
- The church in La Comelle
- Location of La Comelle
- Location within France Location within Bourgogne-Franche-Comté
- Coordinates: 46°52′49″N 4°06′45″E
- Country: France
- Region: Bourgogne-Franche-Comté
- Department: Saône-et-Loire
- Arrondissement: Autun
- Canton: Autun-2
- Area^{1}: 22.73 km^{2} (8.78 sq mi)
- Elevation: 390 m (1,280 ft)
- Highest elevation: 446 m (1,463 ft)
- Lowest elevation: 283 m (928 ft)
- Population (2023): 248
  - Density: 10.9/km^{2} (28.3/sq mi)
- Time zone: UTC+01:00 (CET)
  - Summer (DST): UTC+02:00 (CEST)
- INSEE/Postal code: 71142 /71990
- ^{1} French Land Register data, which excludes lakes, ponds, glaciers > 1 km^{2} (0.386 sq mi or 247 acres) and river estuaries.

La Comelle (French pronunciation: [la kɔmɛl]) is a commune in the Saône-et-Loire department in the region of Bourgogne-Franche-Comté in eastern France. It was the birthplace of Jeanne Baret, the first woman to circumnavigate the world.

== See also ==
- Communes of the Saône-et-Loire department
- Parc naturel régional du Morvan
