= Saint-Prix, Saône-et-Loire =

Saint-Prix
- Commune
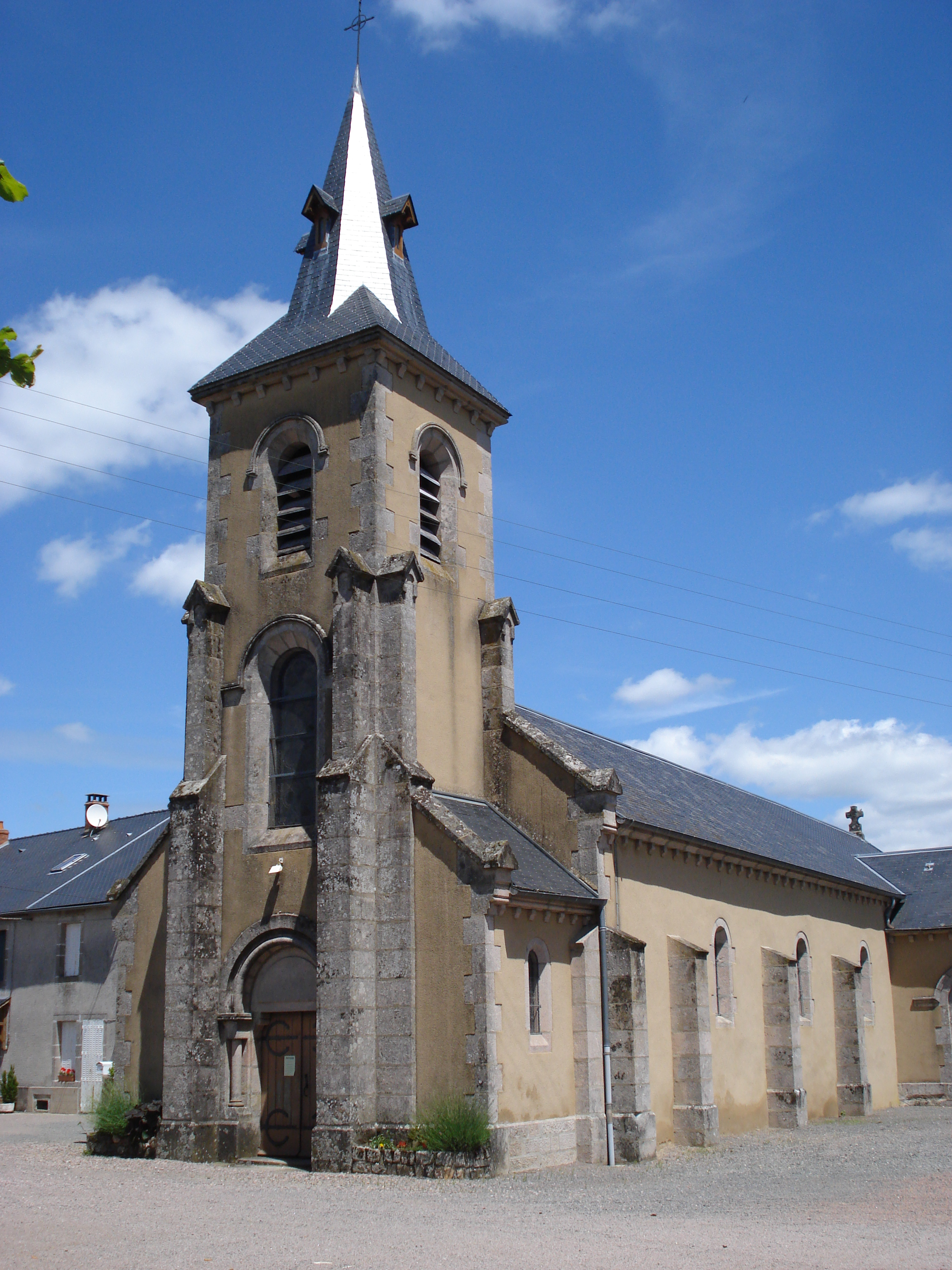
- The church in Saint-Prix
- Location of Saint-Prix
- Location within France Location within Bourgogne-Franche-Comté
- Coordinates: 46°57′25″N 4°04′22″E
- Country: France
- Region: Bourgogne-Franche-Comté
- Department: Saône-et-Loire
- Arrondissement: Autun
- Canton: Autun-2
- Area^{1}: 34.14 km^{2} (13.18 sq mi)
- Elevation: 450 m (1,480 ft)
- Highest elevation: 901 m (2,956 ft)
- Lowest elevation: 385 m (1,263 ft)
- Population (2023): 201
  - Density: 5.89/km^{2} (15.2/sq mi)
- Time zone: UTC+01:00 (CET)
  - Summer (DST): UTC+02:00 (CEST)
- INSEE/Postal code: 71472 /71990
- ^{1} French Land Register data, which excludes lakes, ponds, glaciers > 1 km^{2} (0.386 sq mi or 247 acres) and river estuaries.

Saint-Prix (French pronunciation: [sɛ̃ pʁi]) is a commune in the Saône-et-Loire department in the region of Bourgogne-Franche-Comté in eastern France.

== See also ==
- Communes of the Saône-et-Loire department
