= Uchon =

- Commune
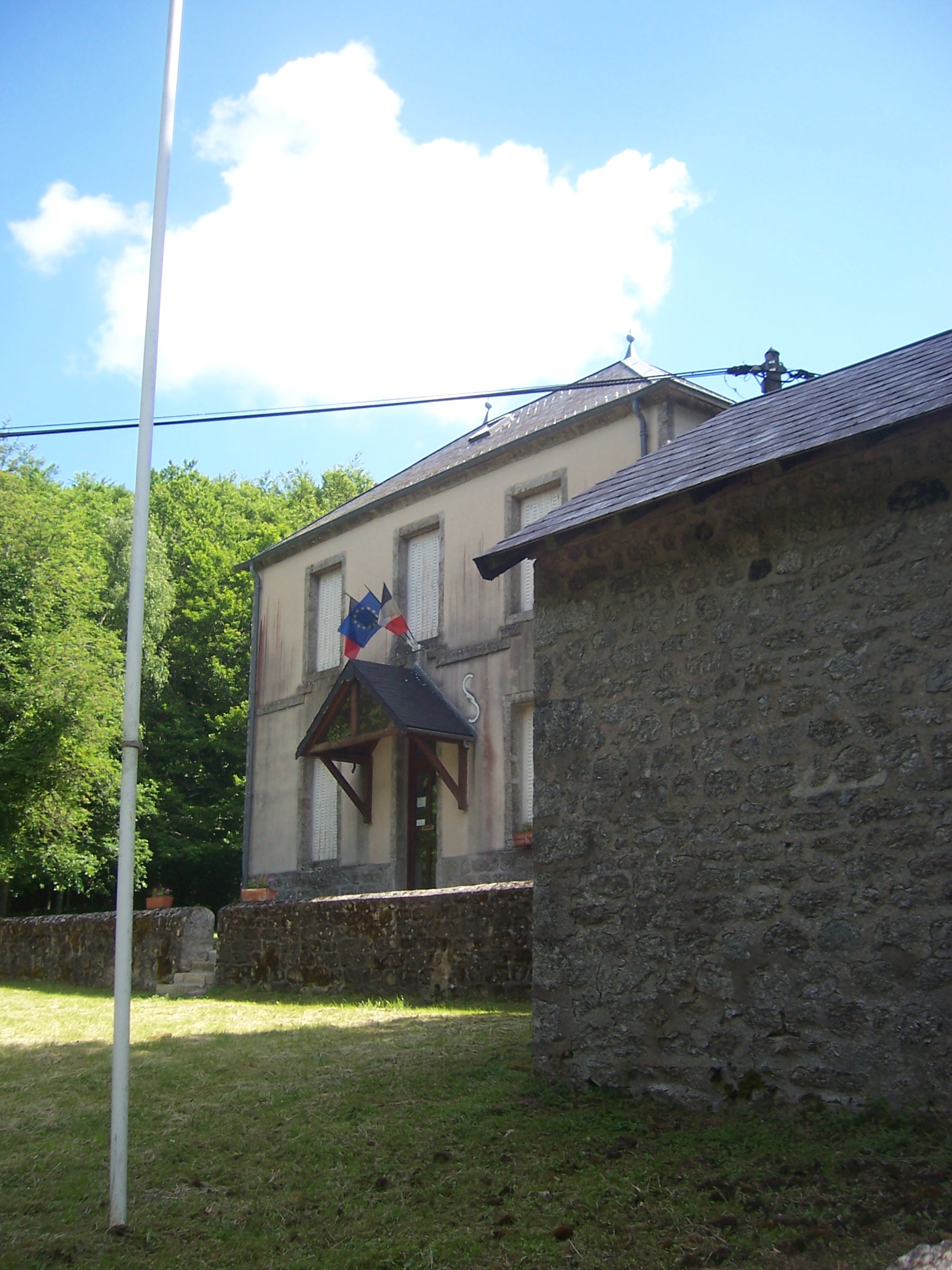
- Town hall
- Location of Uchon
- Location within France Location within Bourgogne-Franche-Comté
- Coordinates: 46°48′48″N 4°15′19″E
- Country: France
- Region: Bourgogne-Franche-Comté
- Department: Saône-et-Loire
- Arrondissement: Autun
- Canton: Autun-2
- Intercommunality: Grand Autunois Morvan

Government
  - Mayor (2020–2026): Guy Federspield
- Area^{1}: 11.86 km^{2} (4.58 sq mi)
- Elevation: 683 m (2,241 ft)
- Highest elevation: 681 m (2,234 ft)
- Lowest elevation: 309 m (1,014 ft)
- Population (2023): 105
  - Density: 8.85/km^{2} (22.9/sq mi)
- Time zone: UTC+01:00 (CET)
  - Summer (DST): UTC+02:00 (CEST)
- INSEE/Postal code: 71551 /71190
- ^{1} French Land Register data, which excludes lakes, ponds, glaciers > 1 km^{2} (0.386 sq mi or 247 acres) and river estuaries.

Uchon (French pronunciation: [yʃɔ̃]) is a commune in the Saône-et-Loire department in the region of Bourgogne-Franche-Comté in eastern France.

== Population ==
Historical population
Year	Pop.	±% p.a.
1968	89	—
1975	73	−2.79%
1982	67	−1.22%
1990	55	−2.44%
1999	85	+4.96%
2007	96	+1.53%
2012	102	+1.22%
2017	98	−0.80%
2023	105	+1.16%
Source: INSEE

== See also ==
- Communes of the Saône-et-Loire department
- Parc naturel régional du Morvan
