= Thil-sur-Arroux =

- Commune
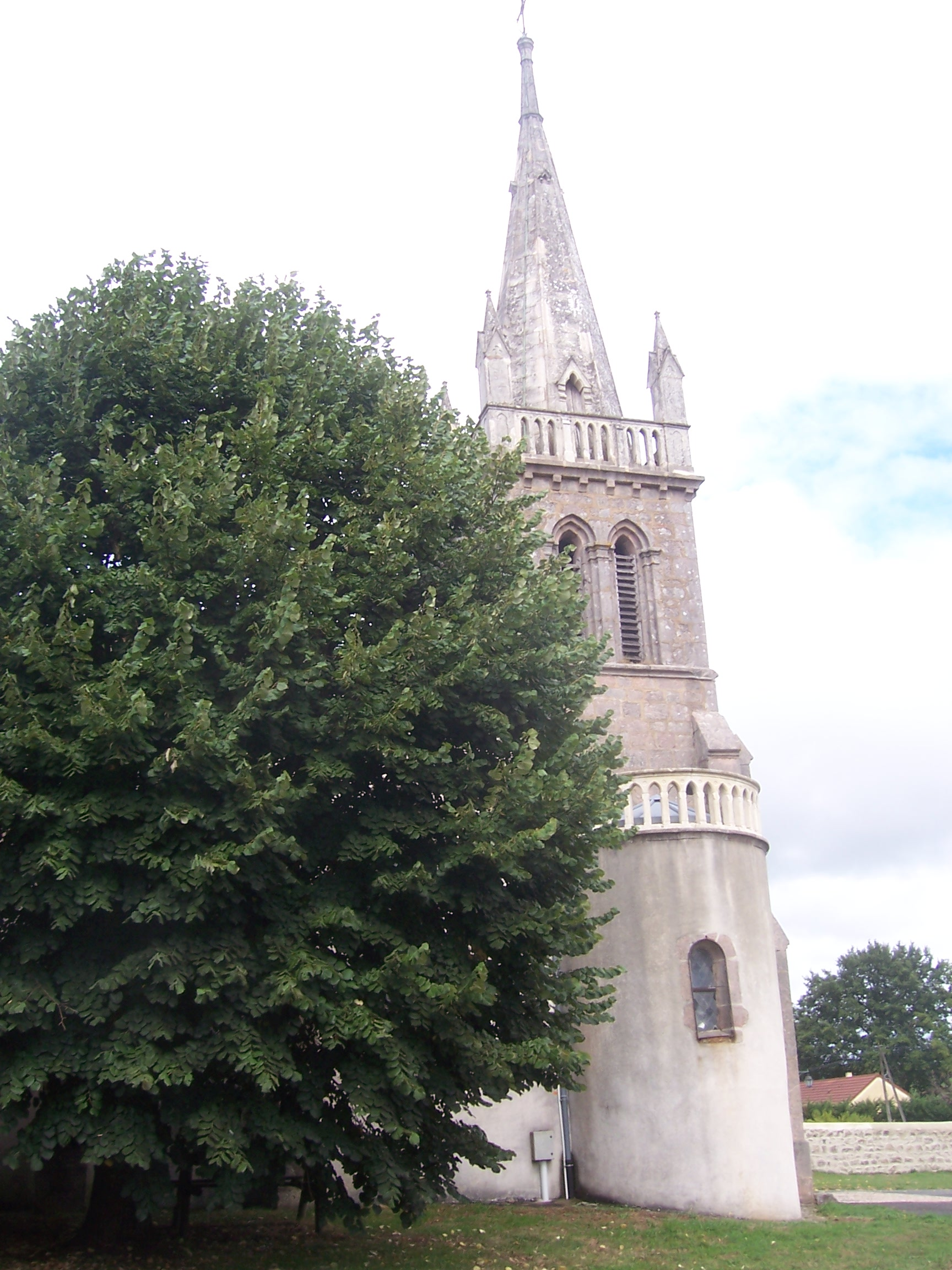
- The church in Thil-sur-Arroux
- Location of Thil-sur-Arroux
- Location within France Location within Bourgogne-Franche-Comté
- Coordinates: 46°48′07″N 4°05′45″E
- Country: France
- Region: Bourgogne-Franche-Comté
- Department: Saône-et-Loire
- Arrondissement: Autun
- Canton: Autun-2
- Area^{1}: 13.44 km^{2} (5.19 sq mi)
- Elevation: 290 m (950 ft)
- Highest elevation: 472 m (1,549 ft)
- Lowest elevation: 261 m (856 ft)
- Population (2023): 138
  - Density: 10.3/km^{2} (26.6/sq mi)
- Time zone: UTC+01:00 (CET)
  - Summer (DST): UTC+02:00 (CEST)
- INSEE/Postal code: 71537 /71190
- ^{1} French Land Register data, which excludes lakes, ponds, glaciers > 1 km^{2} (0.386 sq mi or 247 acres) and river estuaries.

Thil-sur-Arroux (French pronunciation: [til syʁ aʁu], literally Thil on Arroux) is a commune in the Saône-et-Loire department in the region of Bourgogne-Franche-Comté in eastern France.

Thil-sur-Arroux is popular with many nationalities. A high percentage of the homes are second/vacation homes. The area is part of the Morvan Park region and has some of the best air quality in Europe.

== See also ==
- Communes of the Saône-et-Loire department
- Parc naturel régional du Morvan
