= Saint-Didier-sur-Arroux =

- Commune
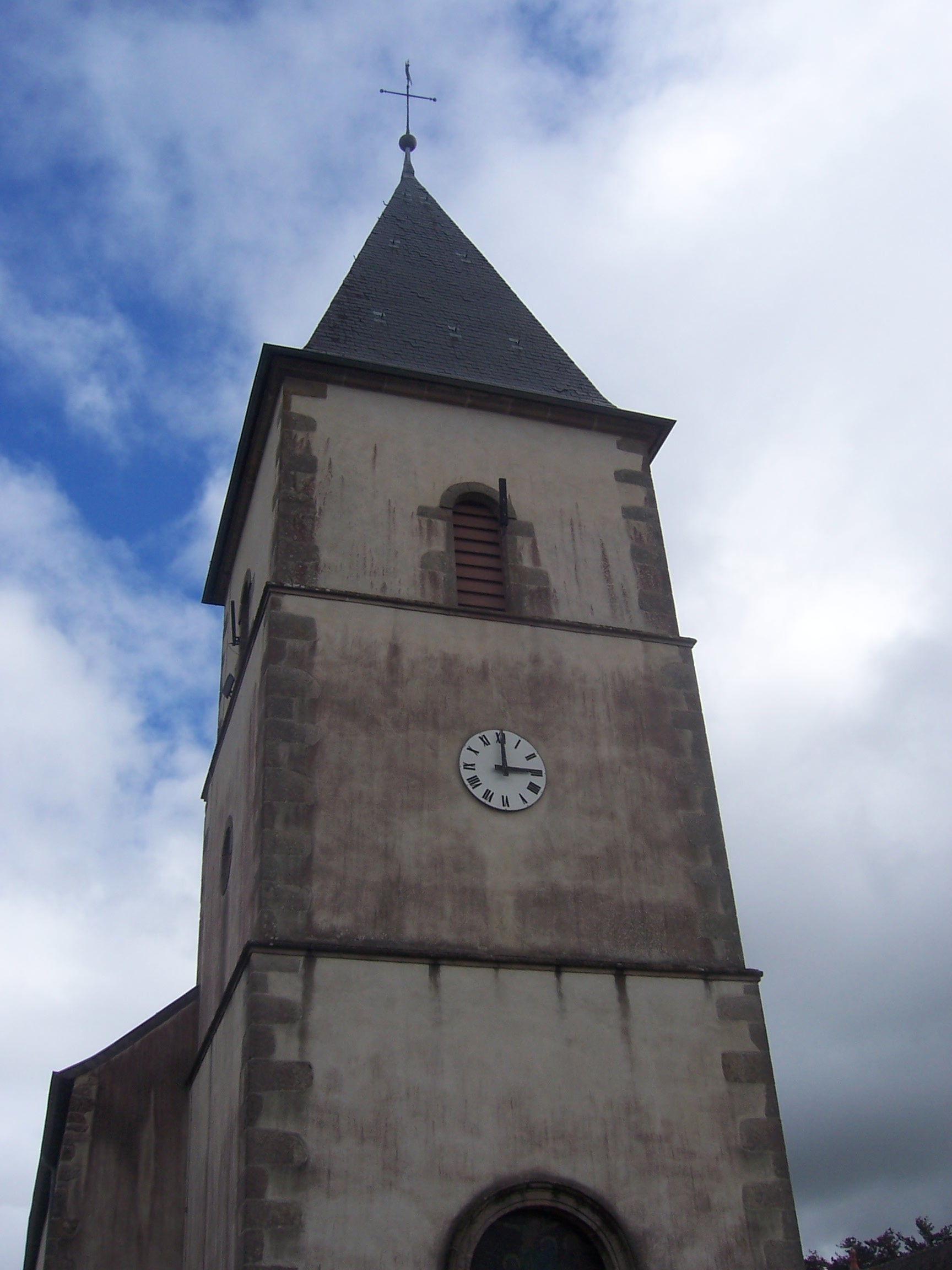
- The church in Saint-Didier-sur-Arroux
- Location of Saint-Didier-sur-Arroux
- Location within France Location within Bourgogne-Franche-Comté
- Coordinates: 46°50′03″N 4°06′57″E
- Country: France
- Region: Bourgogne-Franche-Comté
- Department: Saône-et-Loire
- Arrondissement: Autun
- Canton: Autun-2
- Area^{1}: 27.94 km^{2} (10.79 sq mi)
- Elevation: 350 m (1,150 ft)
- Highest elevation: 470 m (1,540 ft)
- Lowest elevation: 263 m (863 ft)
- Population (2023): 232
  - Density: 8.30/km^{2} (21.5/sq mi)
- Time zone: UTC+01:00 (CET)
  - Summer (DST): UTC+02:00 (CEST)
- INSEE/Postal code: 71407 /71190
- ^{1} French Land Register data, which excludes lakes, ponds, glaciers > 1 km^{2} (0.386 sq mi or 247 acres) and river estuaries.

Saint-Didier-sur-Arroux (French pronunciation: [sɛ̃ didje syʁ aʁu], literally Saint-Didier on Arroux) is a commune in the Saône-et-Loire department in the region of Bourgogne-Franche-Comté in eastern France.

== See also ==
- Communes of the Saône-et-Loire department
- Parc naturel régional du Morvan
