= Charmoy, Saône-et-Loire =

Charmoy
- Commune
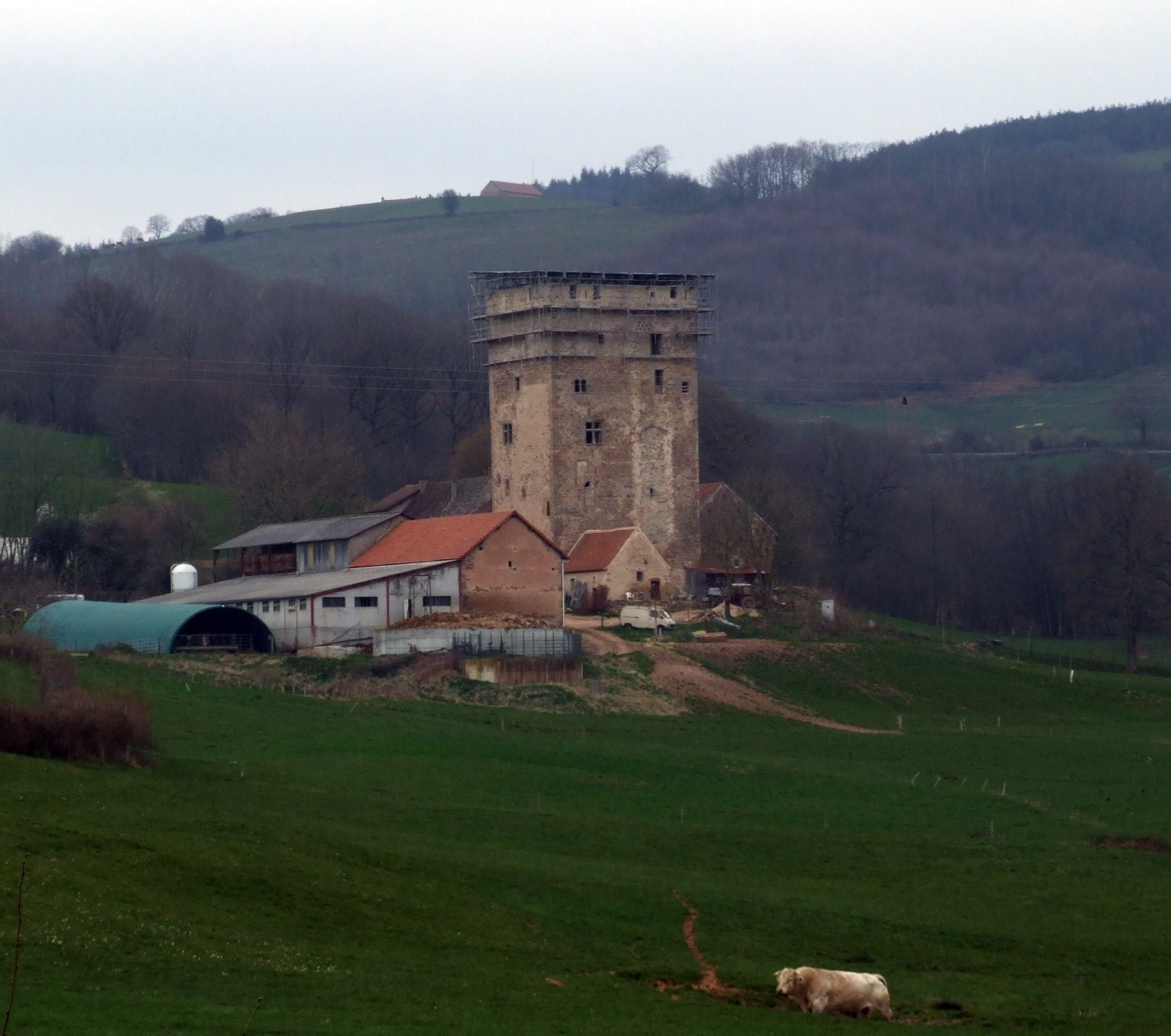
- Tour du bost
- Location of Charmoy
- Location within France Location within Bourgogne-Franche-Comté
- Coordinates: 46°45′25″N 4°20′02″E
- Country: France
- Region: Bourgogne-Franche-Comté
- Department: Saône-et-Loire
- Arrondissement: Autun
- Canton: Autun-2
- Intercommunality: CU Creusot Montceau
- Area^{1}: 39.54 km^{2} (15.27 sq mi)
- Elevation: 310 m (1,020 ft)
- Highest elevation: 643 m (2,110 ft)
- Lowest elevation: 295 m (968 ft)
- Population (2023): 276
  - Density: 6.98/km^{2} (18.1/sq mi)
- Time zone: UTC+01:00 (CET)
  - Summer (DST): UTC+02:00 (CEST)
- INSEE/Postal code: 71103 /71710
- ^{1} French Land Register data, which excludes lakes, ponds, glaciers > 1 km^{2} (0.386 sq mi or 247 acres) and river estuaries.

Charmoy (French pronunciation: [ʃaʁmwa]) is a commune in the Saône-et-Loire department in the region of Bourgogne-Franche-Comté in eastern France.

== See also ==
- Communes of the Saône-et-Loire department
