= Arrondissement of Autun =

Coordinates: 46°57′06″N 4°17′58″E

Autun
- Arrondissement
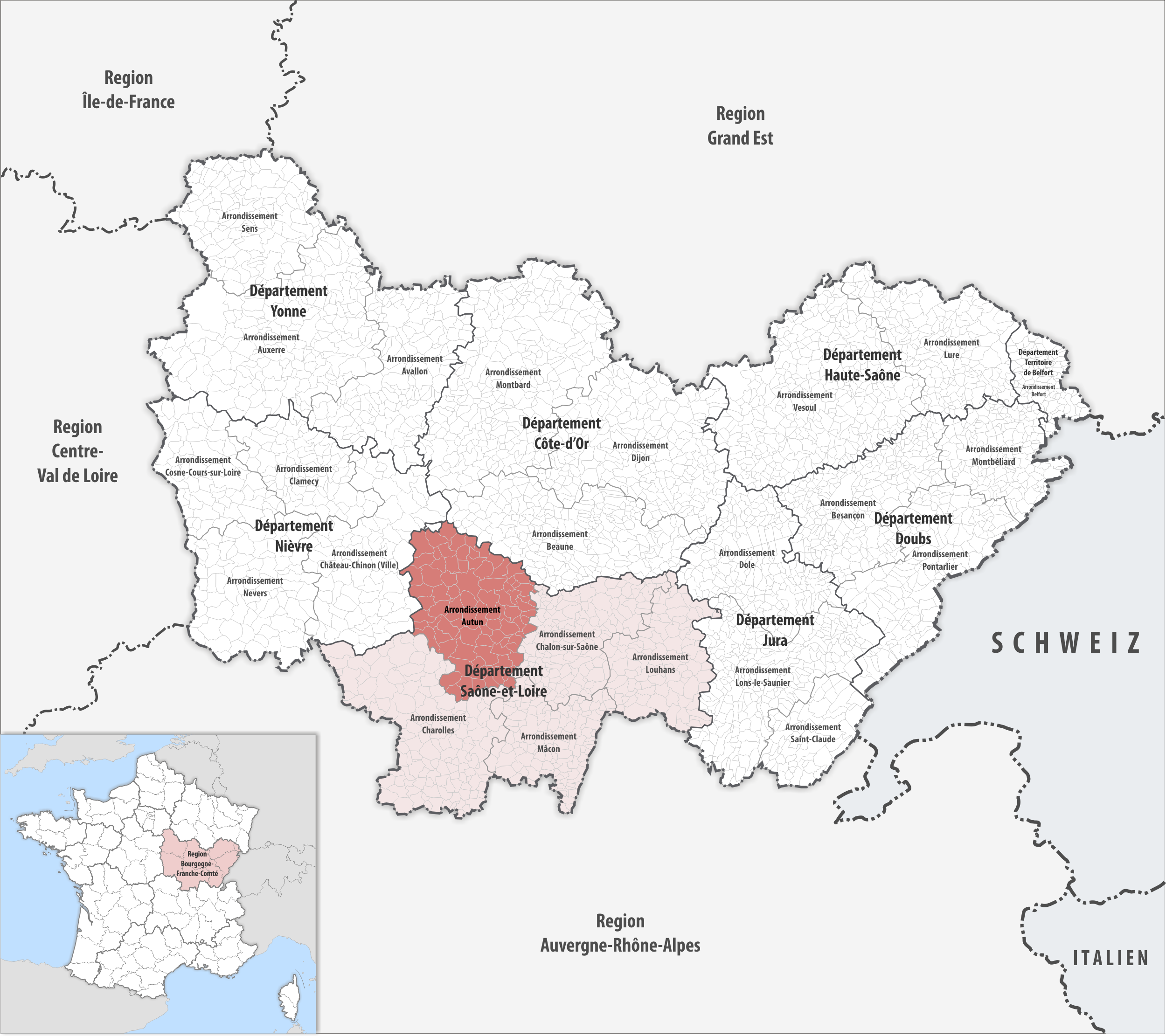
- Location within the region Bourgogne-Franche-Comté
- Country: France
- Region: Bourgogne-Franche-Comté
- Department: Saône-et-Loire
- No. of communes: {{{nbcomm}}}
- Area: 1,994.3 km^{2} (770.0 sq mi)
- Population (2023): 125,452
  - Density: 62.905/km^{2} (162.92/sq mi)
- INSEE code: 711

The arrondissement of Autun is an arrondissement of France in the Saône-et-Loire department in the Bourgogne-Franche-Comté region. It has 89 communes. Its population is 125,896 (2021), and its area is 1,994.3 km^{2} (770.0 sq mi).

== Composition ==
The communes of the arrondissement of Autun, and their INSEE codes, are:

1. Anost (71009)
2. Antully (71010)
3. Autun (71014)
4. Auxy (71015)
5. Barnay (71020)
6. Les Bizots (71038)
7. Blanzy (71040)
8. La Boulaye (71046)
9. Le Breuil (71059)
10. Brion (71062)
11. Broye (71063)
12. La Celle-en-Morvan (71509)
13. La Chapelle-sous-Uchon (71096)
14. Charbonnat (71098)
15. Charmoy (71103)
16. Chissey-en-Morvan (71129)
17. Ciry-le-Noble (71132)
18. Collonge-la-Madeleine (71140)
19. La Comelle (71142)
20. Cordesse (71144)
21. Couches (71149)
22. Créot (71151)
23. Le Creusot (71153)
24. Curgy (71162)
25. Cussy-en-Morvan (71165)
26. Dettey (71172)
27. Dracy-lès-Couches (71183)
28. Dracy-Saint-Loup (71184)
29. Écuisses (71187)
30. Épertully (71188)
31. Épinac (71190)
32. Essertenne (71191)
33. Étang-sur-Arroux (71192)
34. Génelard (71212)
35. Gourdon (71222)
36. La Grande-Verrière (71223)
37. Igornay (71237)
38. Laizy (71251)
39. Lucenay-l'Évêque (71266)
40. Marigny (71278)
41. Marmagne (71282)
42. Mary (71286)
43. Mesvres (71297)
44. Montceau-les-Mines (71306)
45. Montcenis (71309)
46. Montchanin (71310)
47. Monthelon (71313)
48. Mont-Saint-Vincent (71320)
49. Morey (71321)
50. Morlet (71322)
51. Perrecy-les-Forges (71346)
52. Perreuil (71347)
53. La Petite-Verrière (71349)
54. Pouilloux (71356)
55. Reclesne (71368)
56. Roussillon-en-Morvan (71376)
57. Saint-Berain-sous-Sanvignes (71390)
58. Saint-Didier-sur-Arroux (71407)
59. Saint-Émiland (71409)
60. Saint-Eugène (71411)
61. Saint-Eusèbe (71412)
62. Saint-Firmin (71413)
63. Saint-Forgeot (71414)
64. Saint-Gervais-sur-Couches (71424)
65. Saint-Jean-de-Trézy (71431)
66. Saint-Julien-sur-Dheune (71435)
67. Saint-Laurent-d'Andenay (71436)
68. Saint-Léger-du-Bois (71438)
69. Saint-Léger-sous-Beuvray (71440)
70. Saint-Martin-de-Commune (71450)
71. Saint-Maurice-lès-Couches (71464)
72. Saint-Micaud (71465)
73. Saint-Nizier-sur-Arroux (71466)
74. Saint-Pierre-de-Varennes (71468)
75. Saint-Prix (71472)
76. Saint-Romain-sous-Gourdon (71477)
77. Saint-Sernin-du-Bois (71479)
78. Saint-Symphorien-de-Marmagne (71482)
79. Saint-Vallier (71486)
80. Saisy (71493)
81. Sanvignes-les-Mines (71499)
82. Sommant (71527)
83. Sully (71530)
84. La Tagnière (71531)
85. Tavernay (71535)
86. Thil-sur-Arroux (71537)
87. Tintry (71539)
88. Torcy (71540)
89. Uchon (71551)

== History ==
The arrondissement of Autun was created in 1800. In January 2017 it gained 14 communes from the arrondissement of Chalon-sur-Saône and five communes from the arrondissement of Charolles, and it lost six communes to the arrondissement of Chalon-sur-Saône and seven communes to the arrondissement of Charolles.

As a result of the reorganisation of the cantons of France which came into effect in 2015, the borders of the cantons are no longer related to the borders of the arrondissements. The cantons of the arrondissement of Autun were, as of January 2015:

1. Autun-Nord
2. Autun-Sud
3. Couches
4. Le Creusot-Est
5. Le Creusot-Ouest
6. Épinac
7. Issy-l'Évêque
8. Lucenay-l'Évêque
9. Mesvres
10. Montcenis
11. Saint-Léger-sous-Beuvray
