= Antully =

- Commune
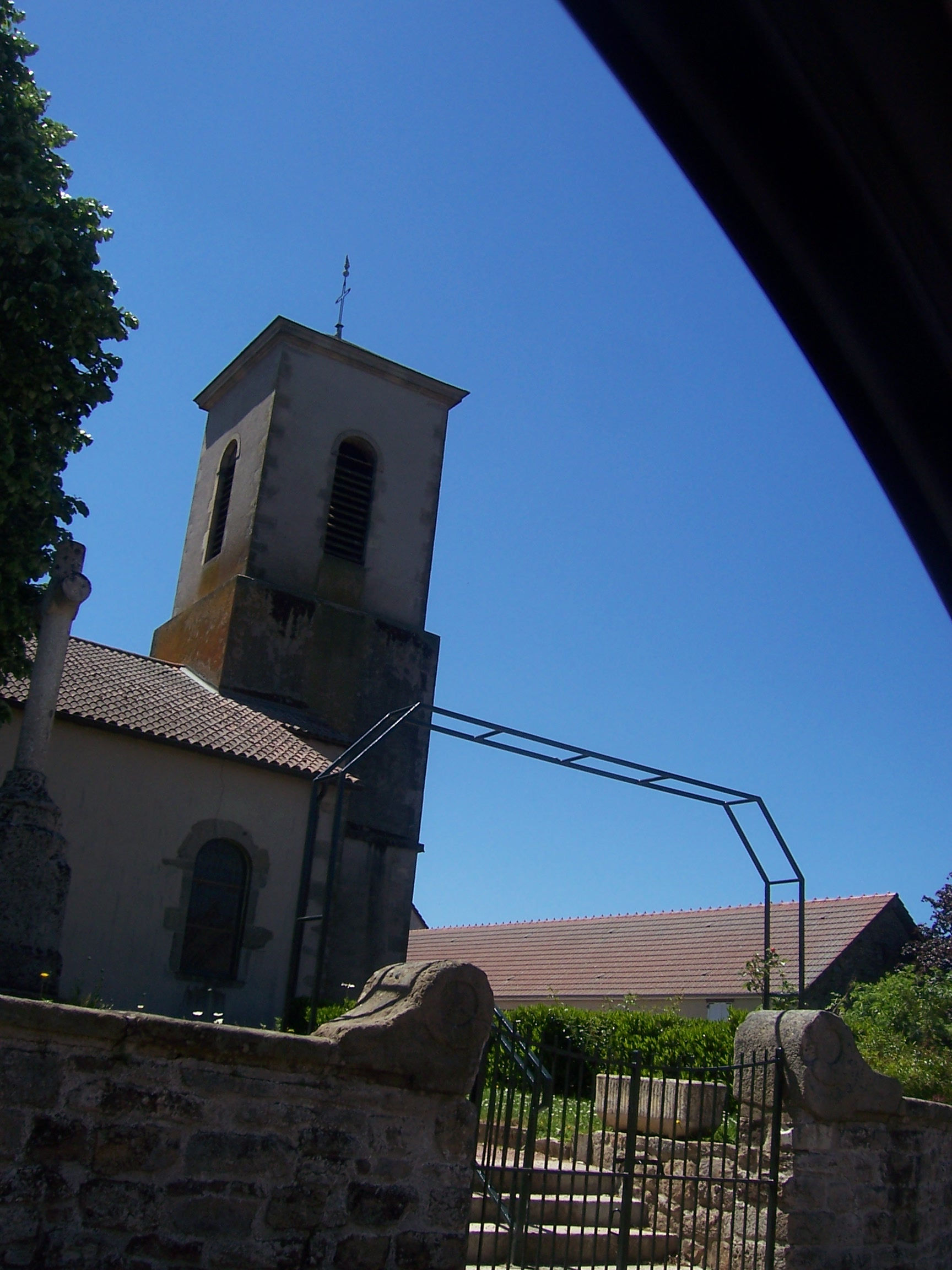
- Location of Antully
- Location within France Location within Bourgogne-Franche-Comté
- Coordinates: 46°54′16″N 4°24′42″E
- Country: France
- Region: Bourgogne-Franche-Comté
- Department: Saône-et-Loire
- Arrondissement: Autun
- Canton: Autun-2

Government
  - Mayor (2020–2026): Patrick Lauferon
- Area^{1}: 37.13 km^{2} (14.34 sq mi)
- Elevation: 542 m (1,778 ft)
- Highest elevation: 579 m (1,900 ft)
- Lowest elevation: 470 m (1,540 ft)
- Population (2023): 789
  - Density: 21.2/km^{2} (55.0/sq mi)
- Time zone: UTC+01:00 (CET)
  - Summer (DST): UTC+02:00 (CEST)
- INSEE/Postal code: 71010 /71400
- ^{1} French Land Register data, which excludes lakes, ponds, glaciers > 1 km^{2} (0.386 sq mi or 247 acres) and river estuaries.

Antully (French pronunciation: [ɑ̃tyli]) is a commune in the Saône-et-Loire department in the Bourgogne-Franche-Comté region in eastern France.

== Geography ==
The commune lies in the northwest of the department near Autun in the area of the Morvan.

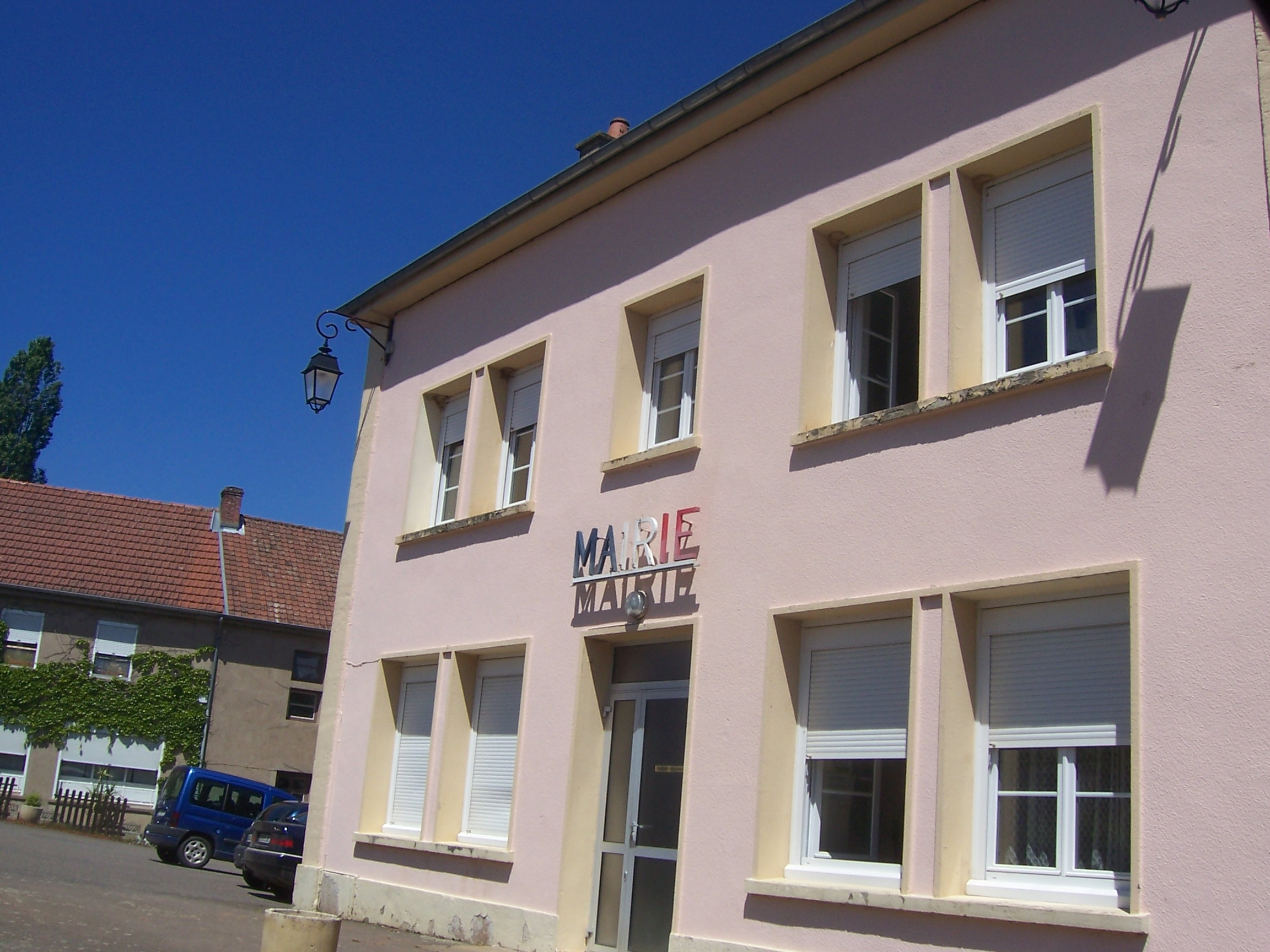
Town hall

== Population ==
Historical population
Year	Pop.	±% p.a.
1968	689	—
1975	637	−1.11%
1982	748	+2.32%
1990	877	+2.01%
1999	861	−0.20%
2007	805	−0.84%
2012	825	+0.49%
2017	854	+0.69%
2023	789	−1.31%
Source: INSEE

== See also ==
- Communes of the Saône-et-Loire department
- Parc naturel régional du Morvan
