= Saint-Nizier-sur-Arroux =

- Commune
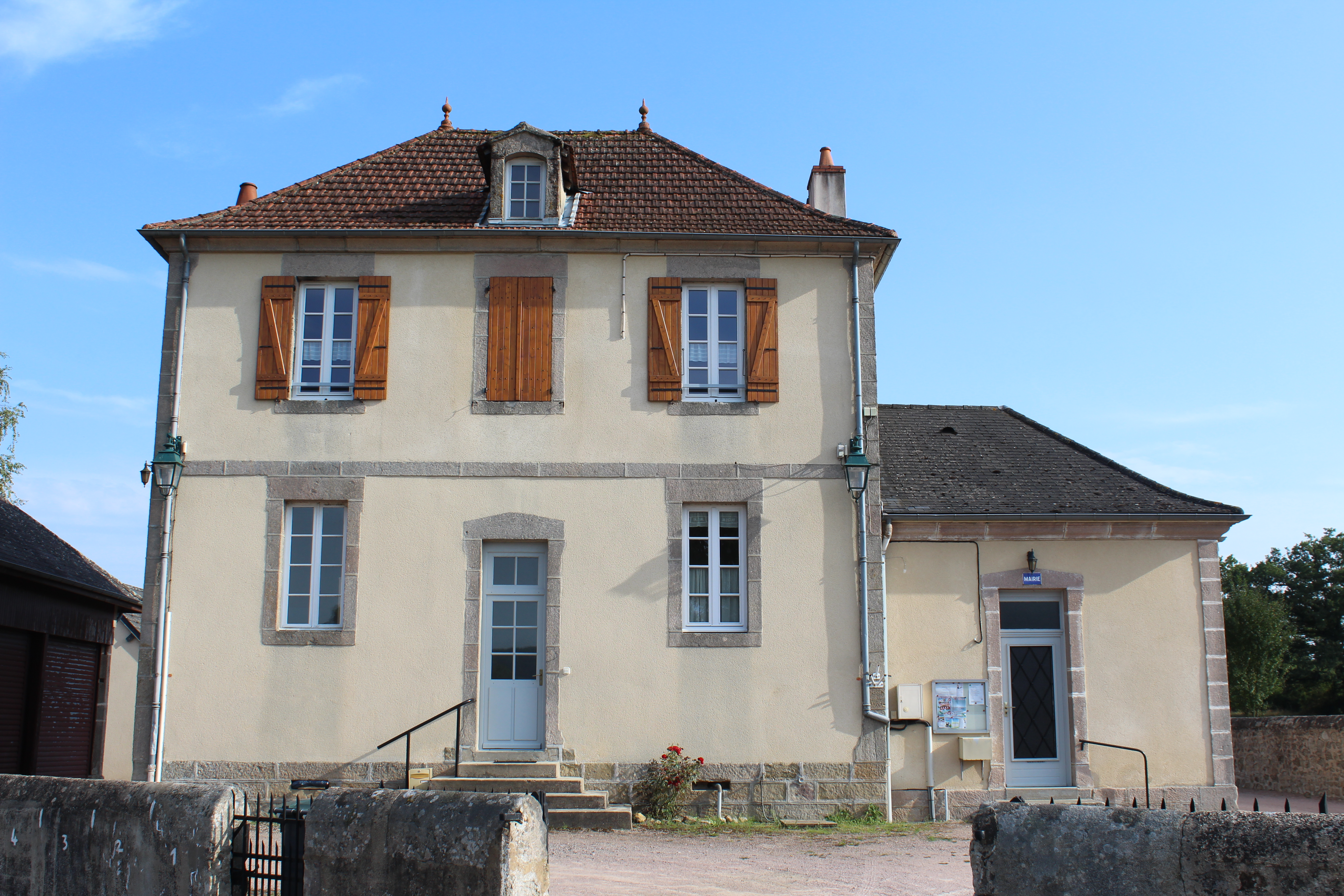
- The town hall in Saint-Nizier-sur-Arroux
- Location of Saint-Nizier-sur-Arroux
- Location within France Location within Bourgogne-Franche-Comté
- Coordinates: 46°48′19″N 4°08′23″E
- Country: France
- Region: Bourgogne-Franche-Comté
- Department: Saône-et-Loire
- Arrondissement: Autun
- Canton: Autun-2
- Area^{1}: 10.16 km^{2} (3.92 sq mi)
- Elevation: 271 m (889 ft)
- Highest elevation: 362 m (1,188 ft)
- Lowest elevation: 262 m (860 ft)
- Population (2023): 124
  - Density: 12.2/km^{2} (31.6/sq mi)
- Time zone: UTC+01:00 (CET)
  - Summer (DST): UTC+02:00 (CEST)
- INSEE/Postal code: 71466 /71190
- ^{1} French Land Register data, which excludes lakes, ponds, glaciers > 1 km^{2} (0.386 sq mi or 247 acres) and river estuaries.

Saint-Nizier-sur-Arroux is a commune in the Saône-et-Loire department in the region of Bourgogne-Franche-Comté in eastern France.

== See also ==
- Communes of the Saône-et-Loire department
