= Marmagne, Saône-et-Loire =

Marmagne
- Commune
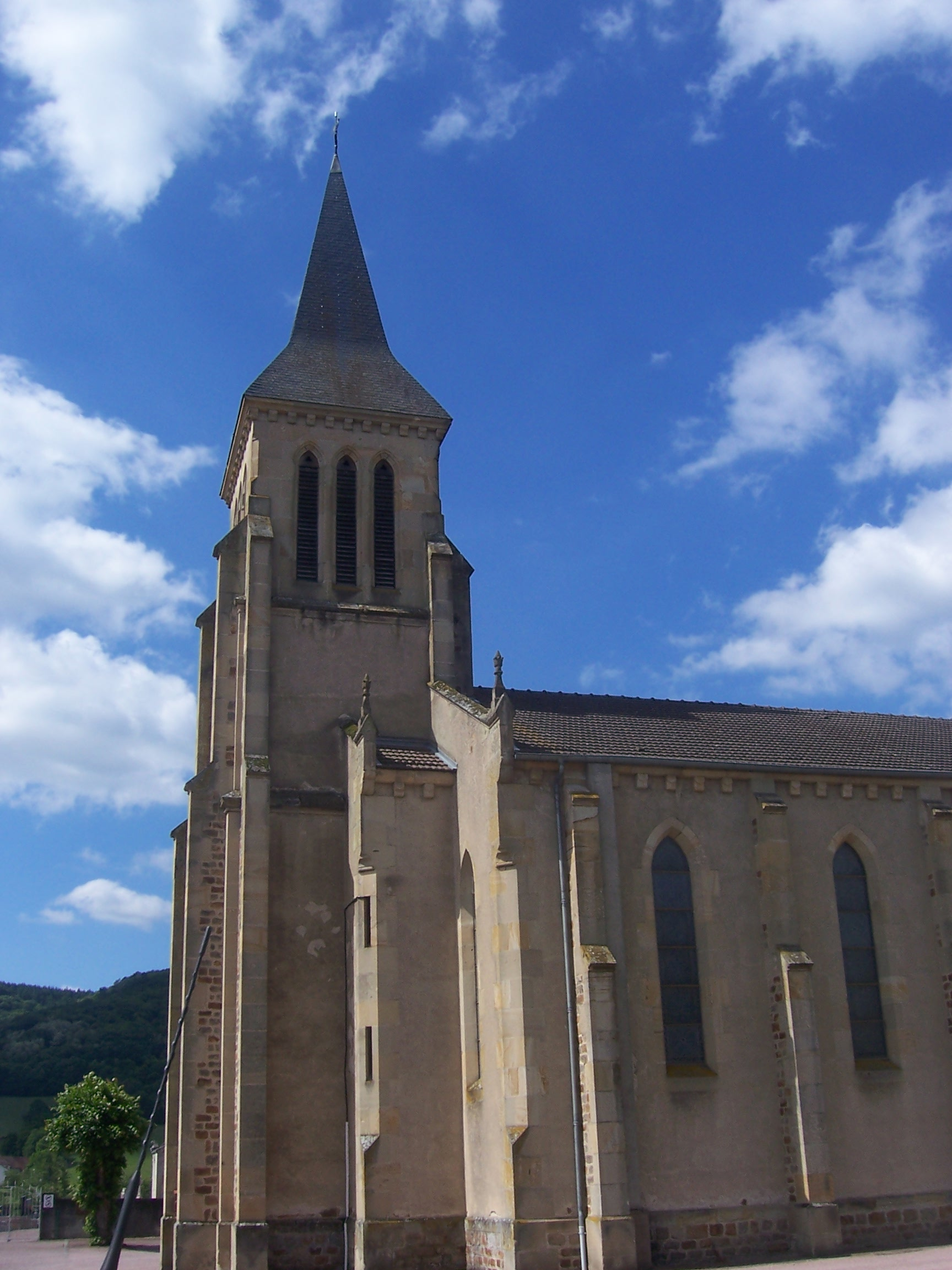
- The church in Marmagne

- Coat of arms
- Location of Marmagne
- Location within France Location within Bourgogne-Franche-Comté
- Coordinates: 46°50′18″N 4°21′31″E
- Country: France
- Region: Bourgogne-Franche-Comté
- Department: Saône-et-Loire
- Arrondissement: Autun
- Canton: Autun-2
- Intercommunality: CU Creusot Montceau
- Area^{1}: 32.26 km^{2} (12.46 sq mi)
- Elevation: 311 m (1,020 ft)
- Highest elevation: 552 m (1,811 ft)
- Lowest elevation: 302 m (991 ft)
- Population (2023): 1,283
  - Density: 39.77/km^{2} (103.0/sq mi)
- Demonym: Marmignauds
- Time zone: UTC+01:00 (CET)
  - Summer (DST): UTC+02:00 (CEST)
- INSEE/Postal code: 71282 /71710
- ^{1} French Land Register data, which excludes lakes, ponds, glaciers > 1 km^{2} (0.386 sq mi or 247 acres) and river estuaries.

Marmagne (French pronunciation: [maʁmaɲ]) is a commune in the Saône-et-Loire department in the Bourgogne-Franche-Comté region in central-east France.

== Transport ==
Marmagne is served by the TER Bourgogne-Franche-Comté Marmagne-sous-Creusot station on the Nevers–Chagny railway.

== Gallery ==
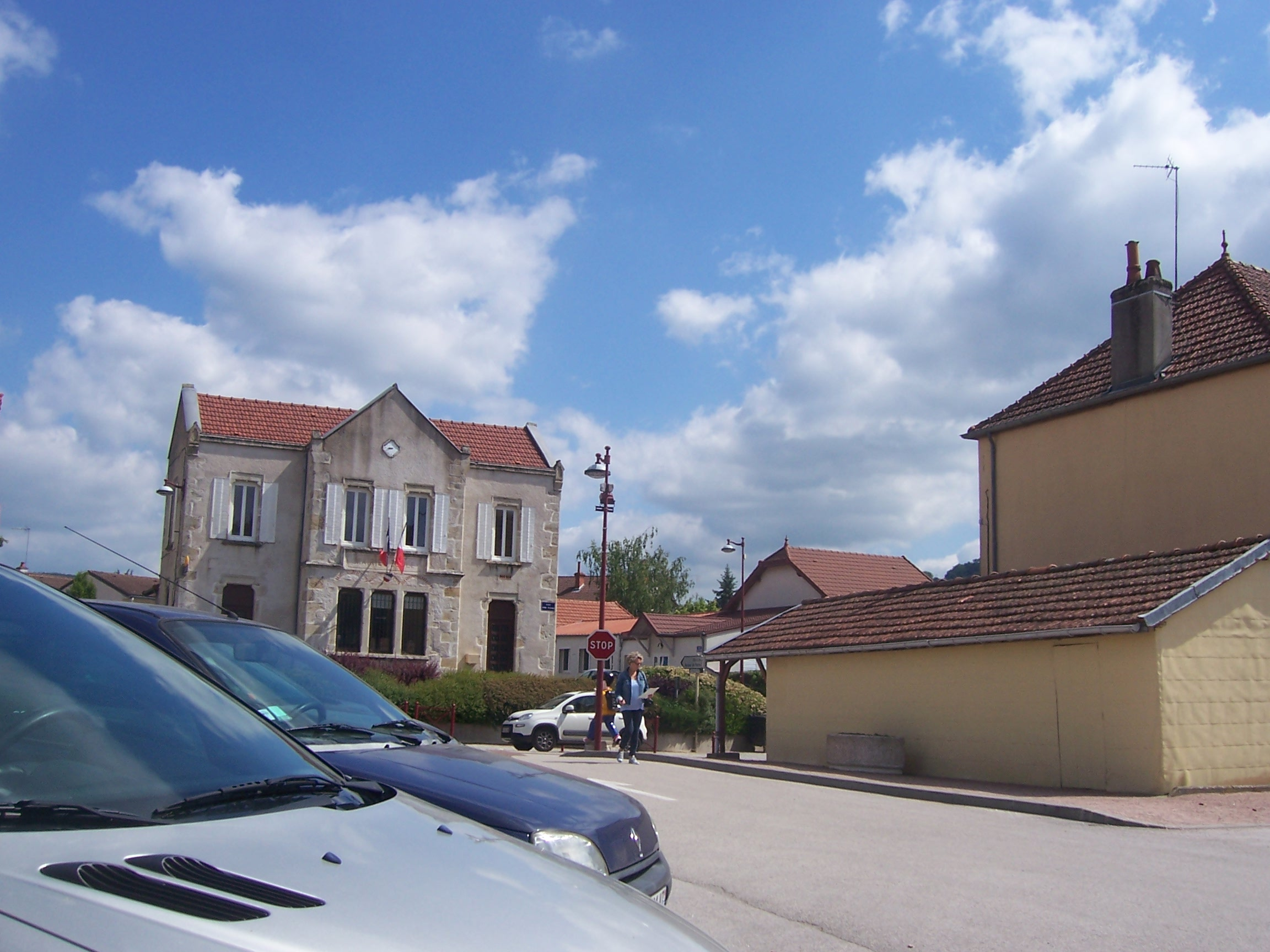
Town hall

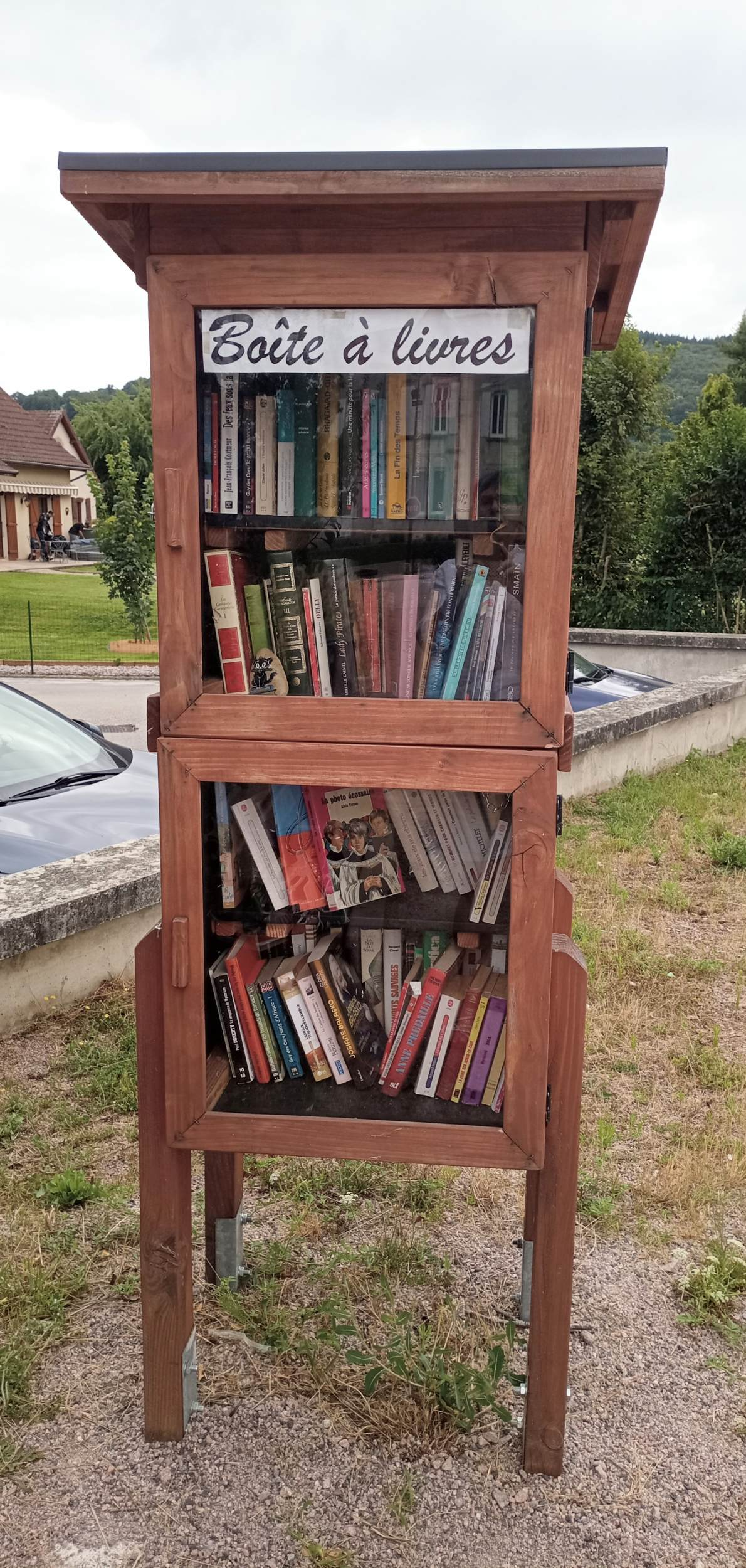
Public bookshelf

== See also ==
- Communes of the Saône-et-Loire department
