= Le Puley =

- Commune
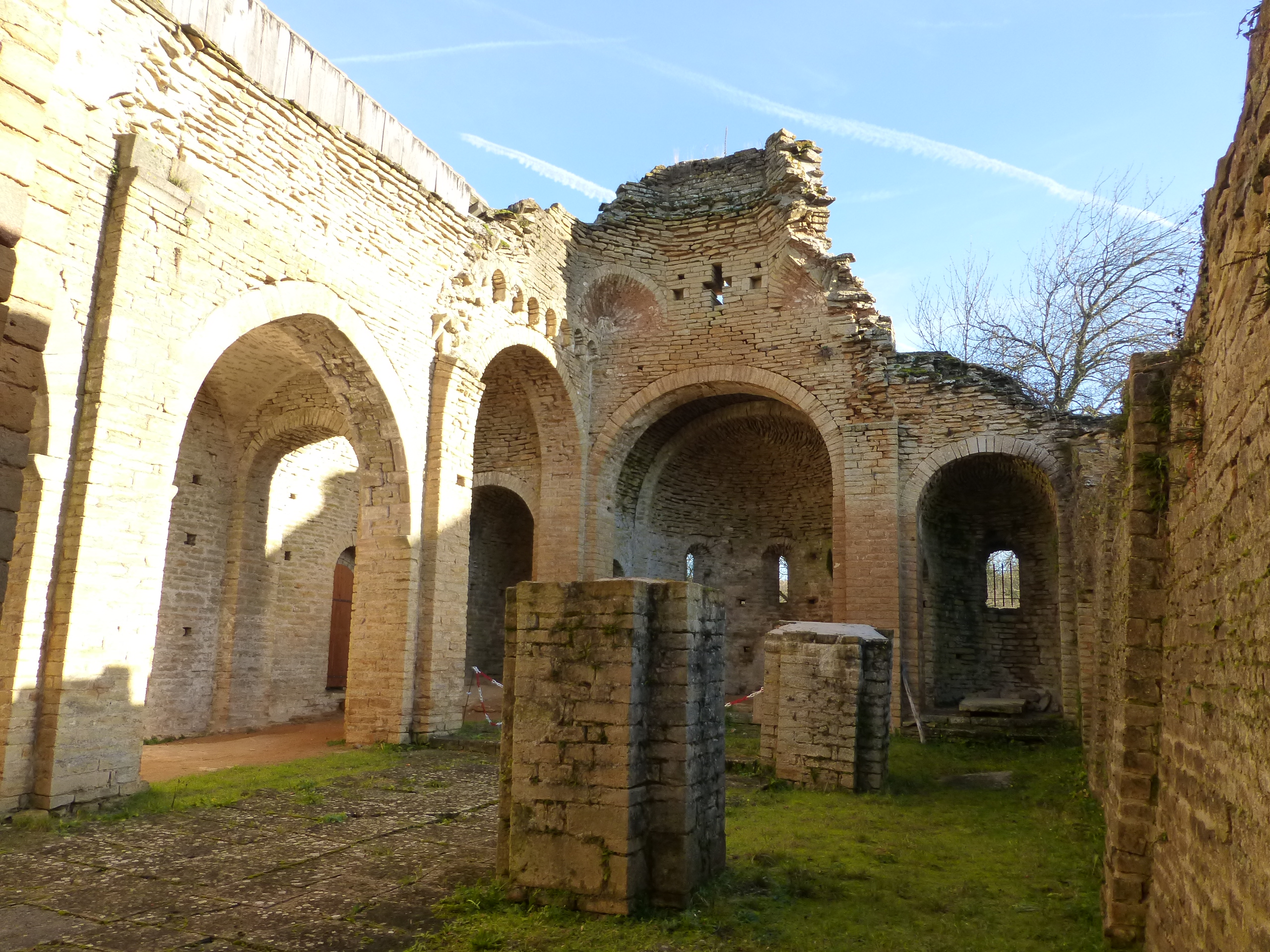
- The Priory

- Coat of arms
- Location of Le Puley
- Location within France Location within Bourgogne-Franche-Comté
- Coordinates: 46°40′45″N 4°33′52″E
- Country: France
- Region: Bourgogne-Franche-Comté
- Department: Saône-et-Loire
- Arrondissement: Chalon-sur-Saône
- Canton: Blanzy
- Area^{1}: 5.3 km^{2} (2.0 sq mi)
- Elevation: 260 m (850 ft)
- Highest elevation: 421 m (1,381 ft)
- Lowest elevation: 249 m (817 ft)
- Population (2023): 79
  - Density: 15/km^{2} (39/sq mi)
- Time zone: UTC+01:00 (CET)
  - Summer (DST): UTC+02:00 (CEST)
- INSEE/Postal code: 71363 /71460
- ^{1} French Land Register data, which excludes lakes, ponds, glaciers > 1 km^{2} (0.386 sq mi or 247 acres) and river estuaries.

Le Puley (French pronunciation: [lə pylɛ]) is a commune in the Saône-et-Loire department in the region of Bourgogne-Franche-Comté in eastern France.

== Geography ==
The main roads are connecting the village to Germagny and Genouilly to the south and Saint-Micaud to the north.

== Main sights ==
The romanesque priory "Saint Christophe" (12th century), protected in 1973 by the French National Heritage as a Monument historique. The belltower collapsed on the building in 1877, causing major damages.

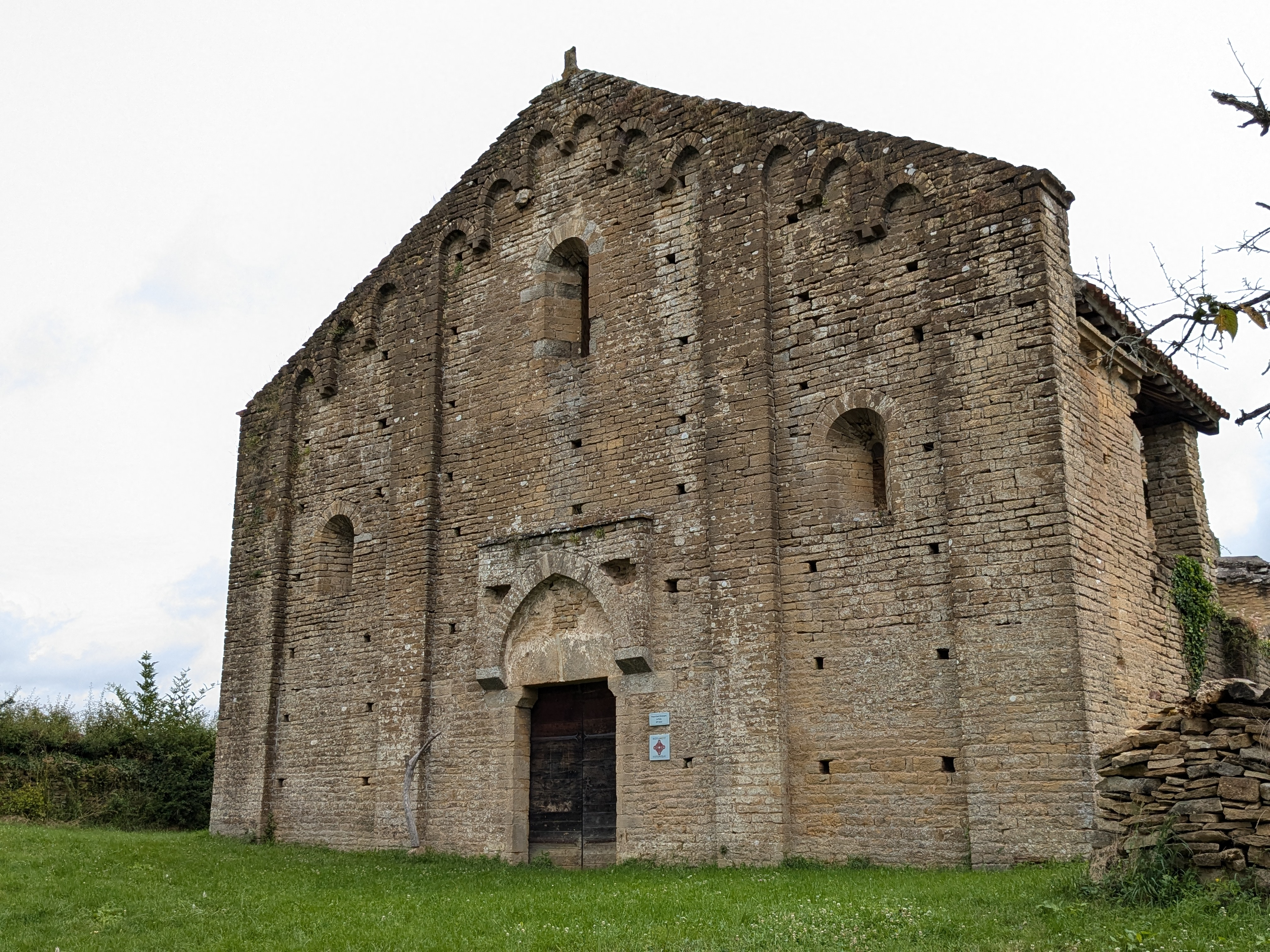
The Romanesque priory.

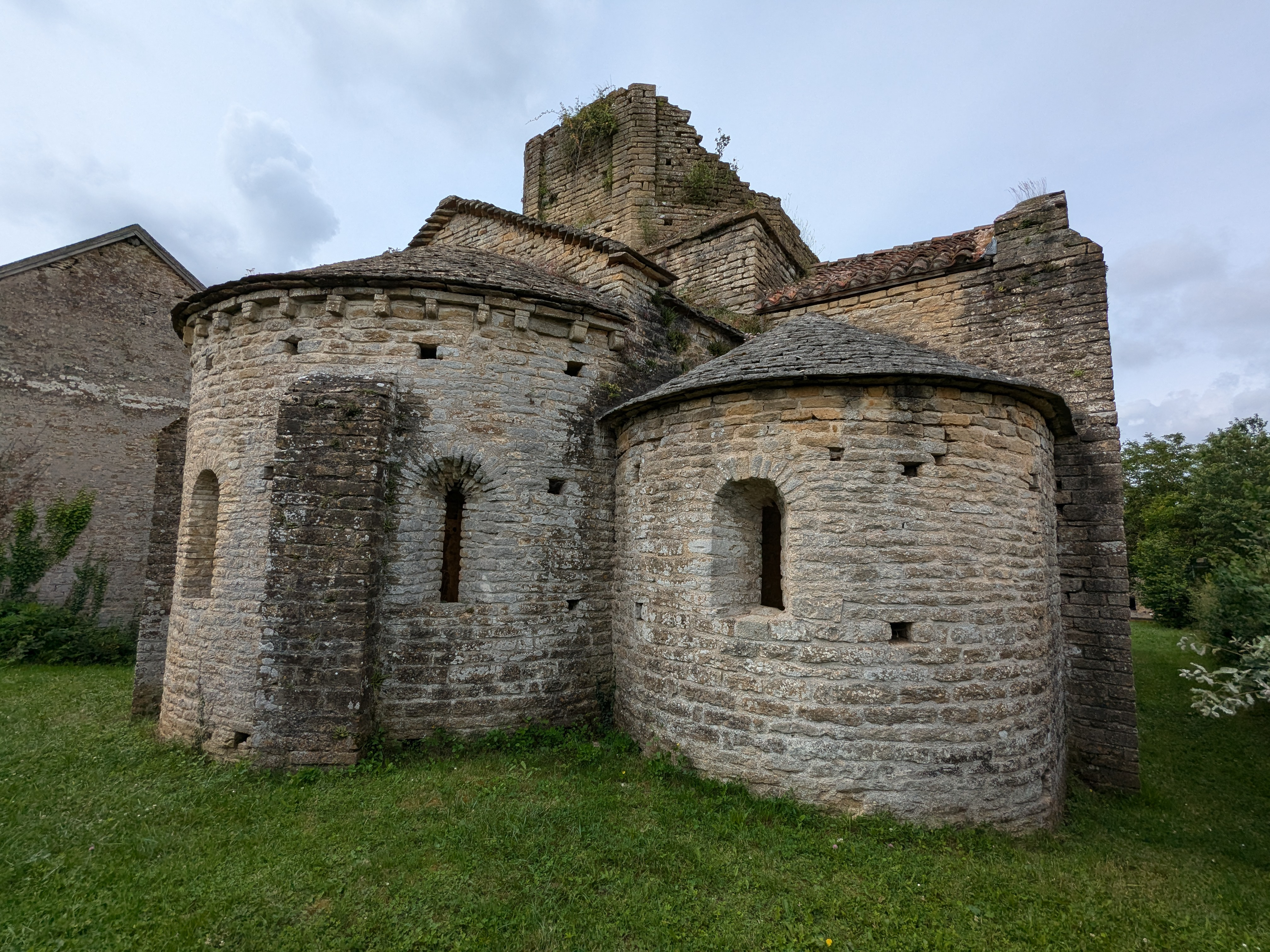
The priory

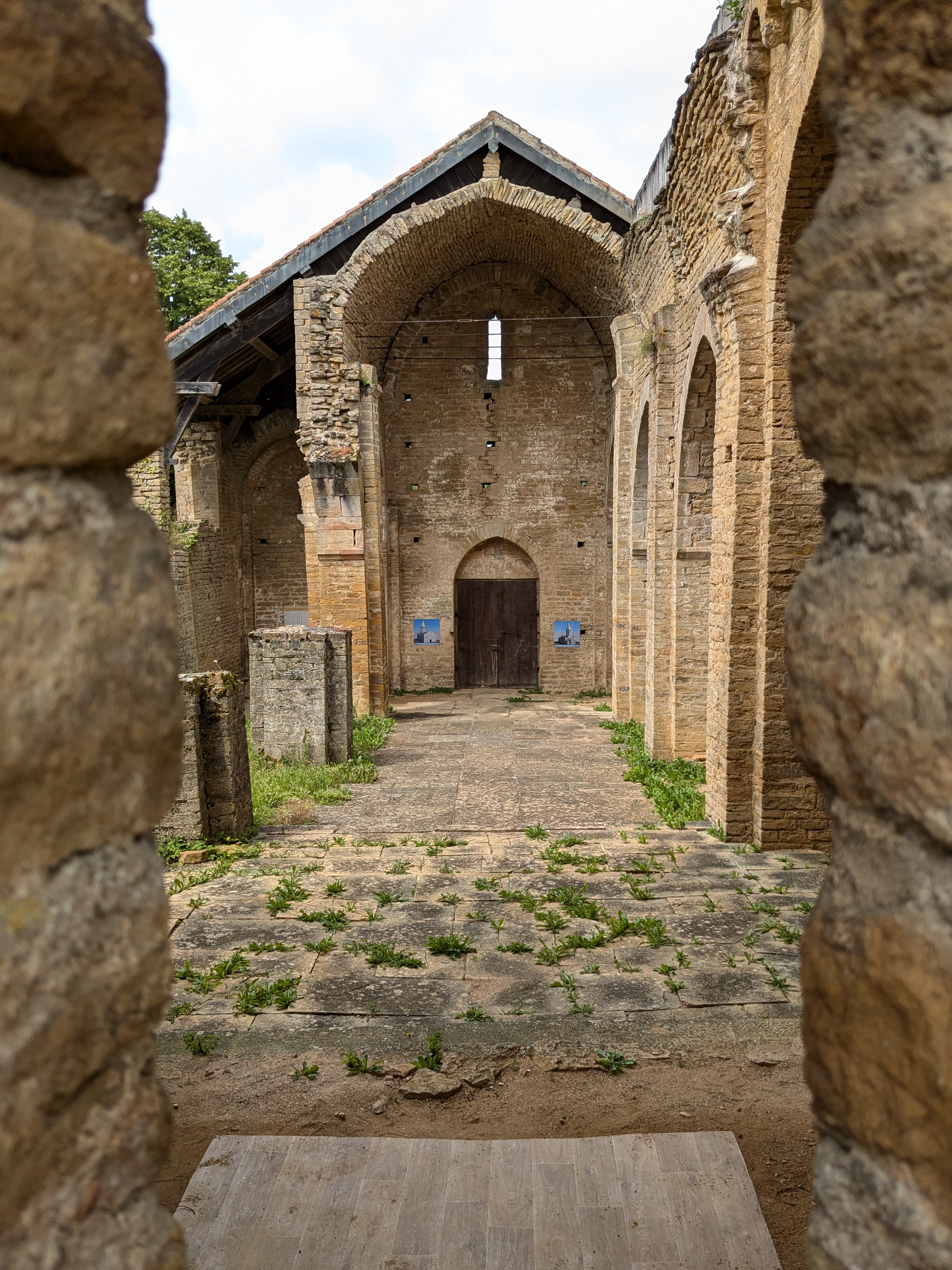
The priory

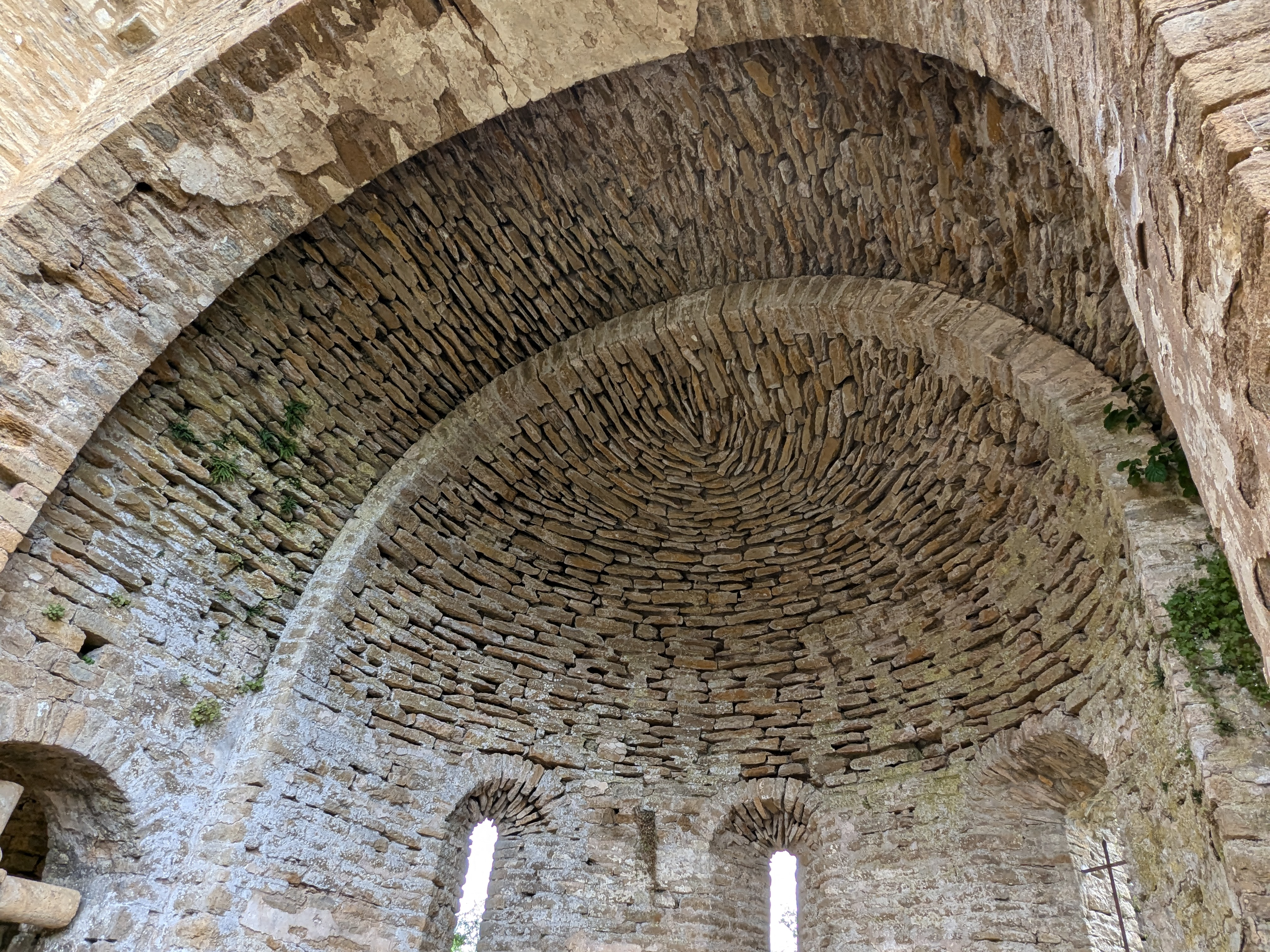
The priory

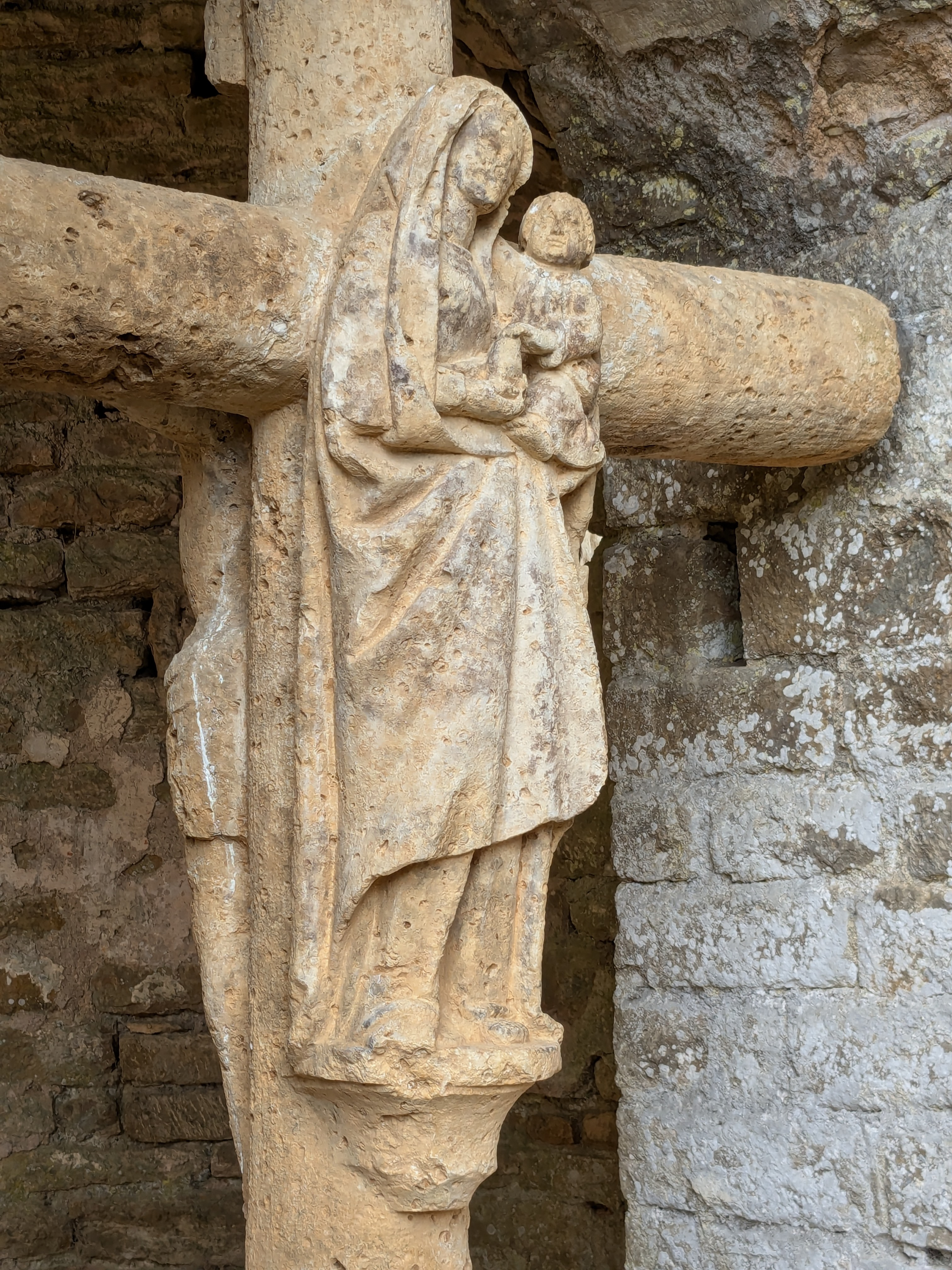
The priory

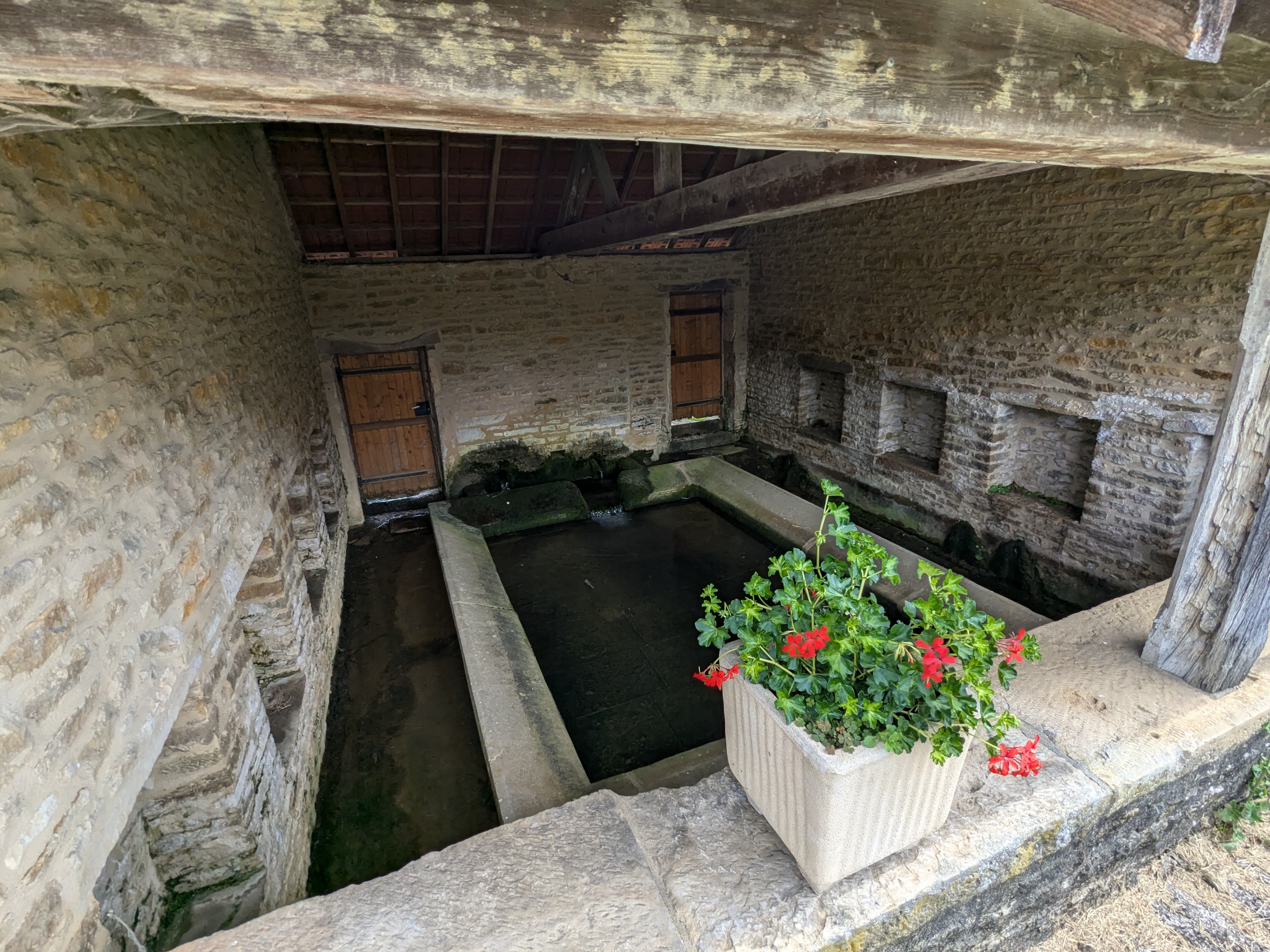
The historic lavoir

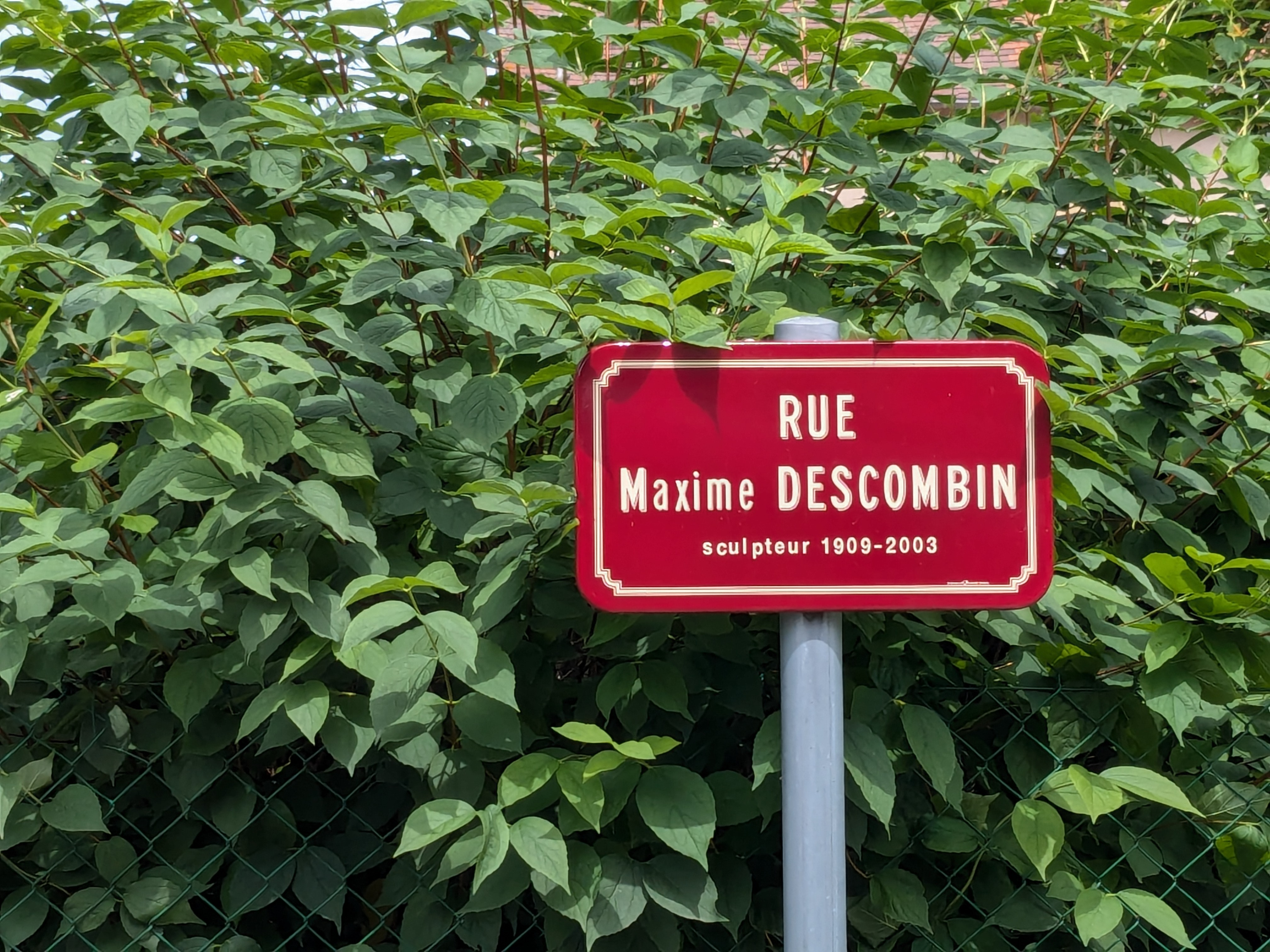
Rue Maxim Descombin

== See also ==
- Guillaume des Autels who used to own a château named "des Hôtels" in le Puley.
- Communes of the Saône-et-Loire department
