= Guillaume Desautels =

French poet

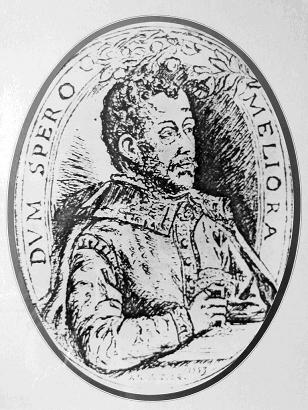
- Born: 1529; Montcenis, Charolles, Germagny or Le Puley in Burgundy
- Died: 1599 (aged 69–70); Lyon
- Occupations: Poet, writer
- Spouse: Jeanne de Bruyere
- Writing career
- Literary movement: Humanism of the Renaissance

Guillaume Desautels (1529-1599) was a French poet of the sixteenth century associated with La Pléiade.

He was born in 1529 in Burgundy. The exact place of birth is not formally known. Some sources gives Montcenis, Charolles, Vernoble in a château (now disappeared) of his father near Genouilly and Le Puley in "Les Hôtels" House, the second château of his family. He was the son of Syacre Desautels and Anne de la Vesure (de la Visine). He died about 1599 in Lyon. Various sources give the years 1570, 1576, 1579 and 1581 as well as "after 1584". One source says he lived to be 70 years of age; his last published work was in 1597.

== Family ==
He was married in 1548 to Jeanne de Bruyere. Other researchers give the name of Jane de Salle. It is not known if there were any children from this marriage or if, in fact, there were two distinct marriages.

His maternal grandmother, also named Anne, was the sister of Etienne de Tyard, father of Pontus de Tyard, one of the seven members of the group of French poets called the Pléiade. Guillaume's mother, Anne de la Vesure would thus have been the first cousin of Etienne.

The family was apparently prominent in Burgundy; they married into the Tyard family, who were not commoners. Also, another Anne de la Vesure (about three generations later) is recorded as the Abbess (Mother Superior) of an Ursuline convent in the then capital city of Burgundy, Dijon.

Pontus (1521–1605) Seigneur de Bissy (Biffy) became the Bishop of Chalon-sur-Saone in 1578 from where he was driven in 1590 and his chateau there plundered as a result of his support for Henry III of France against the Guise brothers who headed the Catholic League.

== Early years ==
As a youth, Guillaume studied under his governor, Jean Tullerius and at the college of Burgundy where he studied the humanities and philosophy until 1542. At the age of 15 he went to Lyon from 1544 to 1546 where he studied with Fontaine and Ancais at the school of Marat. He studied law at the university of Valence in Dauphiné from 1546 until 1549 under Coras. He never practiced the legal profession although he would have had need for it as Judge Magistrate at Cluny in later years. While in Valence he made the acquaintance of Cardinal Berthelemy Des Places, Melin de St. Gelais and his own cousin, the aforementioned Pontus de Tyard (although he probably already had met him in Burgundy) among others. It was during this period he was married to Jeanne de Bruyere whom he left at Montcenis to stay with his father. Guillaume did not leave her as it would seem a new bride in a strange house. The town of Bruyere is about 5 miles west of Vichy and only about 50 miles from Montcenis. It is more than likely that she had many friends and family in the area while Guillaume was away studying.

Apparently lonely in Valence and only 20 years of age, he met a woman named Denise L'hoste and her husband Jean Chabert of the nearby town of Romans, also in Dauphine. He took up residence with them in October 1549 and lived there for seven months during which time he and Denise developed a platonic love affair. She referred to him as "Sainte". It would have been during this period that he probably met Michel de Nostredame, forever known to the world as Nostradamus. In 1547 Nostradamus lived at Salon-de-Provence which is less than a hundred miles from Guillaumes' school at Valence. Nostradamus was quite familiar with Guillaumes' friend and fellow poet, Ronsard and was extremely well known and celebrated in Lyon for his successful efforts to combat the plague in that same year.

Guillaume then returned to Montcenis (which he referred to sarcastically as an "arid desert") in 1550 where he joined his wife and stayed until 1553. It was during this time that his father died and apparently left him little but his good name. The chateau and lands he inherited at Montcenis were "rather noble than rich". It cannot be left unsaid that it was surely in fief to the Barony of Montcenis since, in 1510 a man named Loys d'Orleans (whose titles included Prince, Viscount, Marquis and Baron) also carried the title of "Seigneur de la Baronnaie de Montcenis". The poverty of the estate was probably due to the loss of these lands by the now defunct Duchy of Burgundy to the King of France in 1477, only about 75 years before Syacre's death. While maintaining the name now considered a family name of DesAutels it would seem that the loss of political and military value and connection to Burgundian Charolles and Montcenis had deprived the estate of its source of wealth and prestige.

He moved to Paris in 1553 hoping to secure an appointment with the King. While there he befriended Cardinal de Guise who was probably the source (directly or indirectly) of his well-being during these six years in Paris which he left in April, 1559. He went to Spain in the hope of gaining the favor of the Burgundian-Habsburg rulers there. For whatever reason he immediately sailed for Belgium which was also ruled by the same Burgundian-Habsburg house.

Charles V, Holy Roman Emperor and ruler of much of Europe until his abdication in 1555 was the grandson of Mary of Burgundy who was sole heir to that house when her father was killed in battle in 1477 and France absorbed the province of Burgundy into the French realm. She married a Habsburg (probably to save her remaining power if not her life), thus uniting forever the houses of Burgundy and Habsburg. When Charles V abdicated his son Philip II of Spain became King and it was to him at Brussels that Guillaume set his gaze. He was there a mere two months when he left Brussels for Antwerp (Anvers, fr.) but was there only a few weeks. He was named Cartographer to the King for this short time and was probably so short a time because Philip II, unhappy at Brussels left permanently for residence in Spain. Guillaume was aided at Brussels by two "beau-freres" brothers-in-law named Diamantius. Since that is not his wife's maiden name, it would appear that he had siblings — at least sisters — unless these two men possibly were husbands to sisters of Guillaume's wife. It is most interesting to ponder why he would have these two close relatives in a locale more than two hundred miles from his native land in Charolles.

== Return to Paris ==
Guillaume returned to Paris shortly after July 1559 where he stayed until 1564. Sometime after that he was at Cluny Abbey where he was appointed Judge Magistrate and is credited with saving the city and the Abbey for the Church when it was under siege by the Huguenot armies. Guillaume proposed that each side send out three knights to do battle. The Catholic knights won the field and thus saved Cluny, which had been (until St. Peter's in Rome just recently built) the greatest church in Western Christendom from the hands of the Protestants — only to be destroyed 200 years later by the republican mobs of the French Revolution.

The appointment of Guillaume to his post at Cluny was undoubtedly with the backing of the Guise brothers to whom his cousin Pontus de Tyard also surely owed his appointment as bishop to Chalon-sur-Saône. With Guillaume, the Catholic forces prevailed at Cluny. With Pontus at Chalon, not only did the Huguenot forces fail but he ended up losing his chateau and bishopric. For Guillaume, it did not hurt that the Desautels name was not unknown in the royal palace at Paris. A Pierre Desautels who had been a military commander in Burgundy had been made Valet de chambre (squire or gentlemans' gentleman) to King Francis I (ruled 1515–1547) in 1531. Francis' son Henry II (ruled 1547–1559) would have known him as well (Henry was born in 1519).

== Writer ==
Guillaume wrote on occasion under the pseudonyms of Glaumalis du Vezelet, G. Tesbault and Terhault. He also used a Latin form of his name ("Altario") and a geographical form: "Terhault" translates to "high ground" or perhaps even tableland. He published works mostly in Lyon but also in Paris, Antwerp and Rouen.

While not a member of the Pléiade, he was known as a major influence on the literary life of his time, if not as a major poet. Guillaume would have known most if not all of those poets, and supported for them in their use of the French language in their poetry. While he too wrote in vernacular French (rather than Latin), he is known for championing the use of Old French in prose and poetry and was against replacing it with a more "manufactured" orthography. He was renowned for his mastery of Latin and Greek. He wrote in the manner of François Rabelais and Pierre de Ronsard — other members of what we call today "La Pléiade". Ronsard (as well as another poet, Charles Fontaine), was undoubtedly his friend and wrote fondly of Guillaume. It is from his work that a reference to Guillaume says that he is "from Vernoble" a reference since confirmed.

== Works ==
The following list contains works not published by him, and/or not containing only his works.

- Traite Touchant L'Ancienne Ecriture de la Langue Francaise et de la Poesie, Contre L'Ortographie des Meygretistes. Lyon, 1548, 1550 Glaumalis de Vezelet
- Le Mois de Mai, par Guillaume Des Autels, Charrolais. Lyon, 1550
- Repos de Grand Travail. Lyon, 1550
- Replique de Guillaume Des Autelz, aux Furieuses Defenses de Louis Meigret. Avec le Suite de Repos. Lyon, 1551
- Amoureux Repos de Guillaume des Autelz, Gentilhomme Charrolais. Lyon, 1553 (contains some poetry under the penname G. Tesbault)
- Recreation des Tristes. Lyon
- Histoire D'Herodiade. 1554
- La Paix Venue du Ciel (dedicated to the Bishop of Arras) with le Tombeau de L'Empereur Charles V Cesar, etc. Antwerp, 1559
- Encomium Galliae Belgicae. Guillaume Altario Carolate Antwerp, 1559
- Remonstrance au People Francoys - etc. Paris, 1559
- Repos de Plus Grand Travail of 1550 was reprinted in 1560 at Lyon
- Deliciae Poetarum Gallorum Hujus Superiorieque Avi Illustrum, 1560 (not entirely his works)
- Harengue au Peuple Francois - etc. Paris, 1560
- Le Premiere Livre de Vers de Marc-Claude de Busset. 1561
- Mitistoire Barragouyne de Fanfreluche et Gaudichon - etc. Lyon, 1574 (or 1576) (reputed to have been written while Guillaume was at Valence)
- Gelodacyre Amoureuse, Contenant Plusiers Aubades, Chansons Gaillardes, Pavanes. 1576
- La Recreation et Passetemps des Tristes - etc. Rouen, (1595 (and 1597)

== Bibliography ==
- Becq de Fouquières, Louis (1879). Œuvres choisies des poètes français du XVI^{e} siècle, contemporains de Ronsard. Paris, G. Charpentier. p. 38. (in French)
- Brooks, Richard A. (1947). A Critical Bibliography of French Literature: The Seventeenth Century Revised. Syracuse University Press.
- Chalmers, Alexander (Revised by) (1812). The General Biographical Dictionary. Vol. III, pp. 197–198.
- Grimal, Pierre (1958). Dictionnaire des Biographies. Paris, Presses Universitaire de France. p. 427.
- Hartmann, Hans. (1907) Guillaume des Autels (1529-1581?): Ein französischer Dichter und Humanist. Buchdruckerei Gebr. Leemann & Co., Verlag der "Academia". (in German).
- Koerner, Valentini (1996). Index Aureliensis: catalogus librorum sedecimo saeculo impressorum. Cu-Des. Volume XI. Baden-Baden. pp. 459–461.
- La Croix du Maine; Antoine du Verdier (1773). Les bibliotheques françoises. Paris, Saillant & Nyon.
- Niceron, Jean-Pierre (1734). Memoir pour servir a l'histoire des hommes illustre dans la Republique des lettres. Vol. V, pp. 14–21. (in French).
- Prévost, Michel; Roman d'Amat, J. Balteau (1939) Dictionnaire de biographie française, Vol. V, pp. 1194–1196 and Vol. X. Paris, Letouzey et Ané. (in French).
- Michaud, Joseph François; Louis Gabriel Michaud (1811). Biographie universelle, ancienne et moderne. Paris, Michaud frères. Vol. III, pp. 92–93. (in French).
- Payen, Jean-François (1853). "Autelz (Guillaume des)" in Nouvelle biographie universelle, edited by Ferdinand Hoefer, Didot frères. Paris, Didot frères. Vol. 3, column 785.
- Young, Margaret L. M. (1961). Guillaume Des Autelz: A Study of His Life and Works. Geneva: E. Droz.
