= Saint-Romain-sous-Gourdon =

- Commune
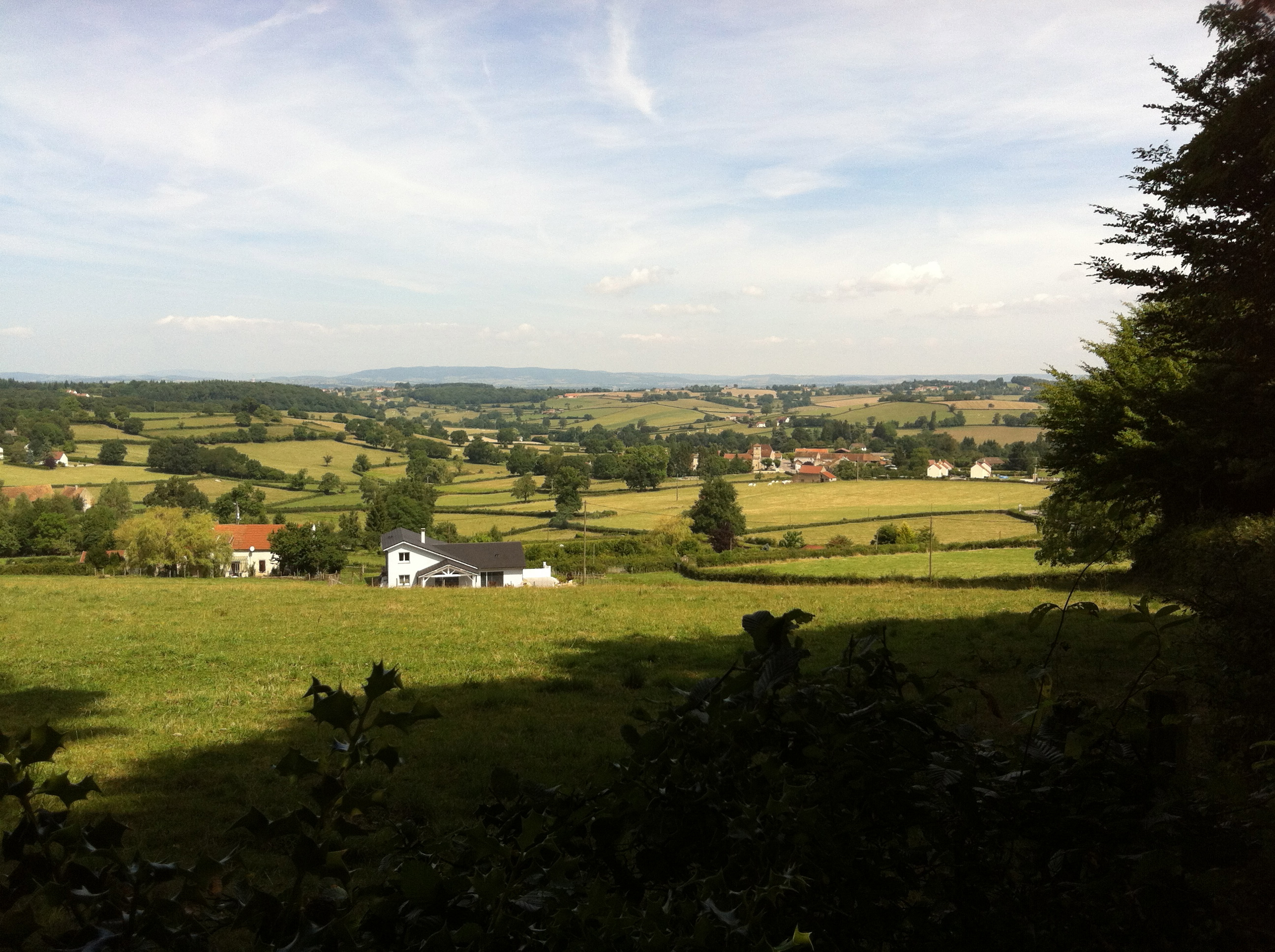
- A general view of Saint-Romain-sous-Gourdon
- Location of Saint-Romain-sous-Gourdon
- Location within France Location within Bourgogne-Franche-Comté
- Coordinates: 46°37′22″N 4°24′16″E
- Country: France
- Region: Bourgogne-Franche-Comté
- Department: Saône-et-Loire
- Arrondissement: Autun
- Canton: Charolles
- Intercommunality: CU Creusot Montceau
- Area^{1}: 18.78 km^{2} (7.25 sq mi)
- Highest elevation: 467 m (1,532 ft)
- Lowest elevation: 301 m (988 ft)
- Population (2023): 473
  - Density: 25.2/km^{2} (65.2/sq mi)
- Time zone: UTC+01:00 (CET)
  - Summer (DST): UTC+02:00 (CEST)
- INSEE/Postal code: 71477 /71230
- ^{1} French Land Register data, which excludes lakes, ponds, glaciers > 1 km^{2} (0.386 sq mi or 247 acres) and river estuaries.

Saint-Romain-sous-Gourdon (French pronunciation: [sɛ̃ ʁɔmɛ̃ su ɡuʁdɔ̃], literally Saint-Romain under Gourdon) is a commune in the Saône-et-Loire department in the region of Bourgogne-Franche-Comté in eastern France.

It is 45 km south west of Chalon-sur-Saône, 25 km due south of Le Creusot and 6 km south east of Montceau-les-Mines.

== See also ==
- Communes of the Saône-et-Loire department
