= Saint-Laurent-d'Andenay =

- Commune
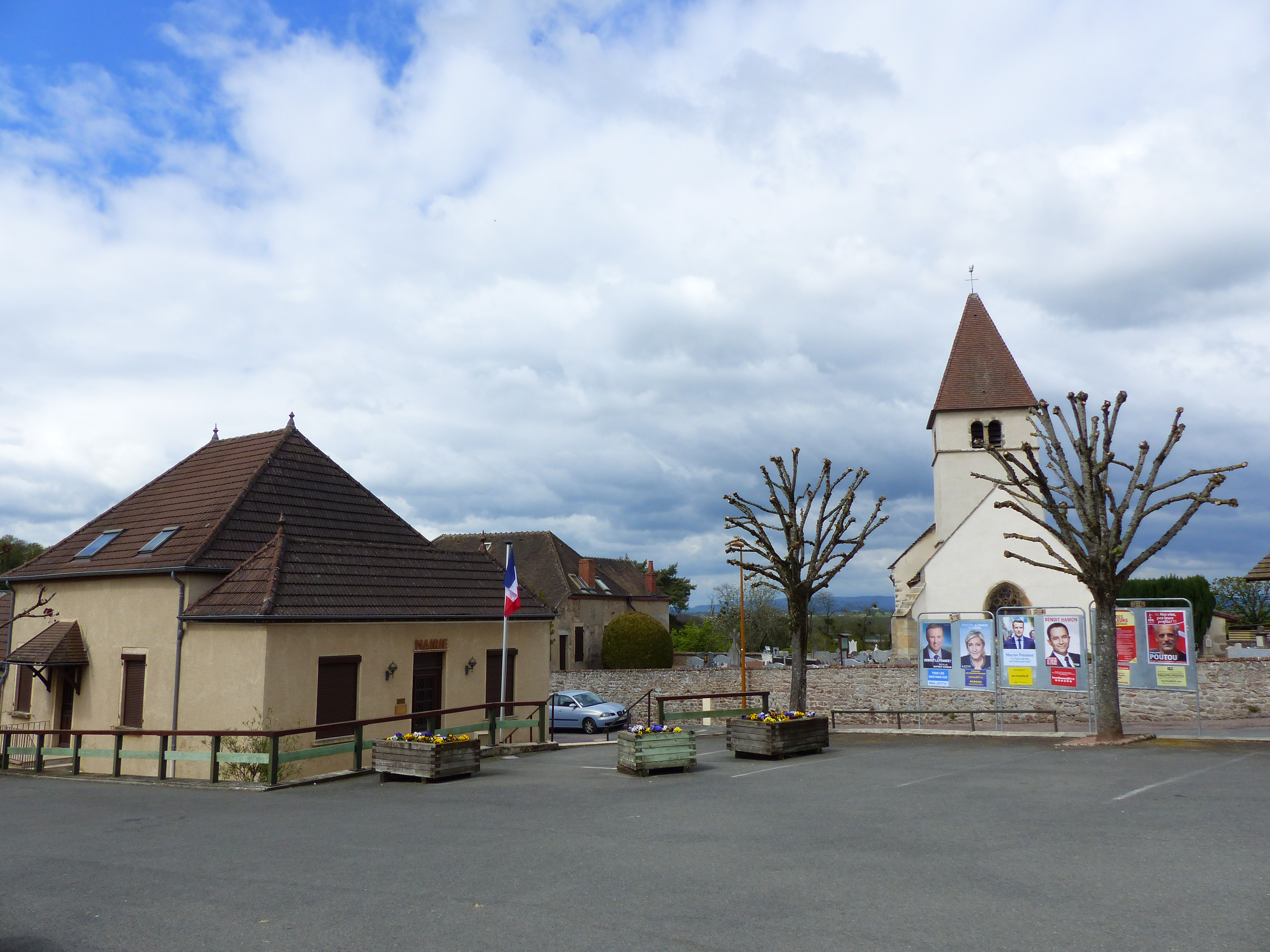
- Town hall and church
- Location of Saint-Laurent-d'Andenay
- Location within France Location within Bourgogne-Franche-Comté
- Coordinates: 46°44′18″N 4°30′54″E
- Country: France
- Region: Bourgogne-Franche-Comté
- Department: Saône-et-Loire
- Arrondissement: Autun
- Canton: Blanzy
- Intercommunality: CU Creusot Montceau
- Area^{1}: 11.49 km^{2} (4.44 sq mi)
- Elevation: 346 m (1,135 ft)
- Highest elevation: 442 m (1,450 ft)
- Lowest elevation: 295 m (968 ft)
- Population (2023): 961
  - Density: 83.6/km^{2} (217/sq mi)
- Time zone: UTC+01:00 (CET)
  - Summer (DST): UTC+02:00 (CEST)
- INSEE/Postal code: 71436 /71210
- ^{1} French Land Register data, which excludes lakes, ponds, glaciers > 1 km^{2} (0.386 sq mi or 247 acres) and river estuaries.

Saint-Laurent-d'Andenay (French pronunciation: [sɛ̃ loʁɑ̃ dɑ̃dnɛ]) is a commune in the Saône-et-Loire department in the region of Bourgogne-Franche-Comté in eastern France.

== See also ==
- Communes of the Saône-et-Loire department
