= Les Bizots =

- Commune
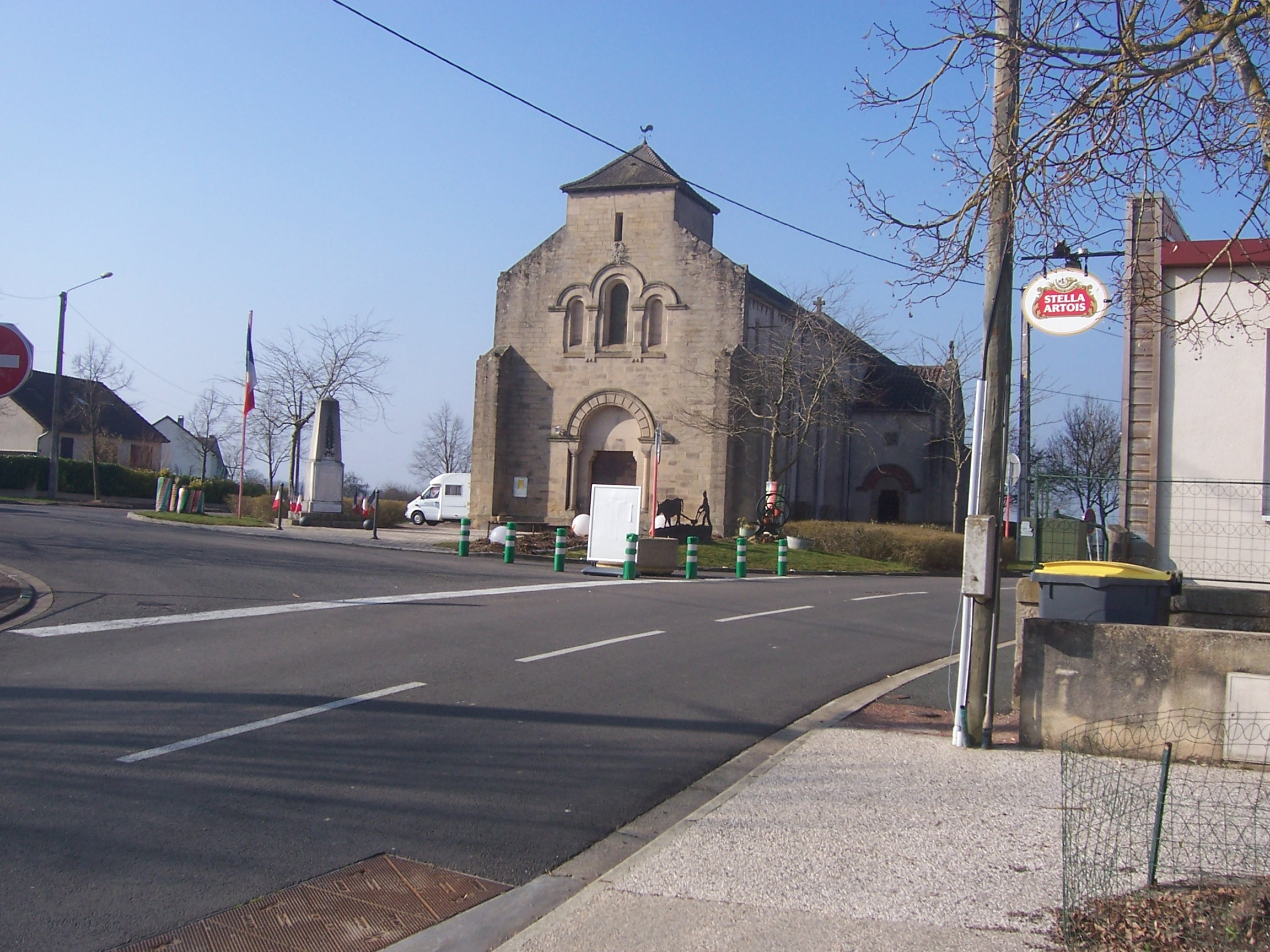
- Location of Les Bizots
- Location within France Location within Bourgogne-Franche-Comté
- Coordinates: 46°45′08″N 4°23′28″E
- Country: France
- Region: Bourgogne-Franche-Comté
- Department: Saône-et-Loire
- Arrondissement: Autun
- Canton: Blanzy
- Intercommunality: CU Creusot Montceau
- Area^{1}: 21.69 km^{2} (8.37 sq mi)
- Elevation: 337 m (1,106 ft)
- Highest elevation: 421 m (1,381 ft)
- Lowest elevation: 289 m (948 ft)
- Population (2023): 471
  - Density: 21.7/km^{2} (56.2/sq mi)
- Time zone: UTC+01:00 (CET)
  - Summer (DST): UTC+02:00 (CEST)
- INSEE/Postal code: 71038 /71710
- ^{1} French Land Register data, which excludes lakes, ponds, glaciers > 1 km^{2} (0.386 sq mi or 247 acres) and river estuaries.

Les Bizots (French pronunciation: [le bizo]) is a commune in the Saône-et-Loire department in the region of Bourgogne-Franche-Comté in eastern France.

== Geography ==
The Bourbince forms part of the commune's southeastern border.

== Population ==
Historical population
Year	Pop.	±% p.a.
1968	286	—
1975	233	−2.89%
1982	369	+6.79%
1990	472	+3.13%
1999	435	−0.90%
2007	426	−0.26%
2012	471	+2.03%
2017	465	−0.26%
2023	471	+0.21%
Source: INSEE

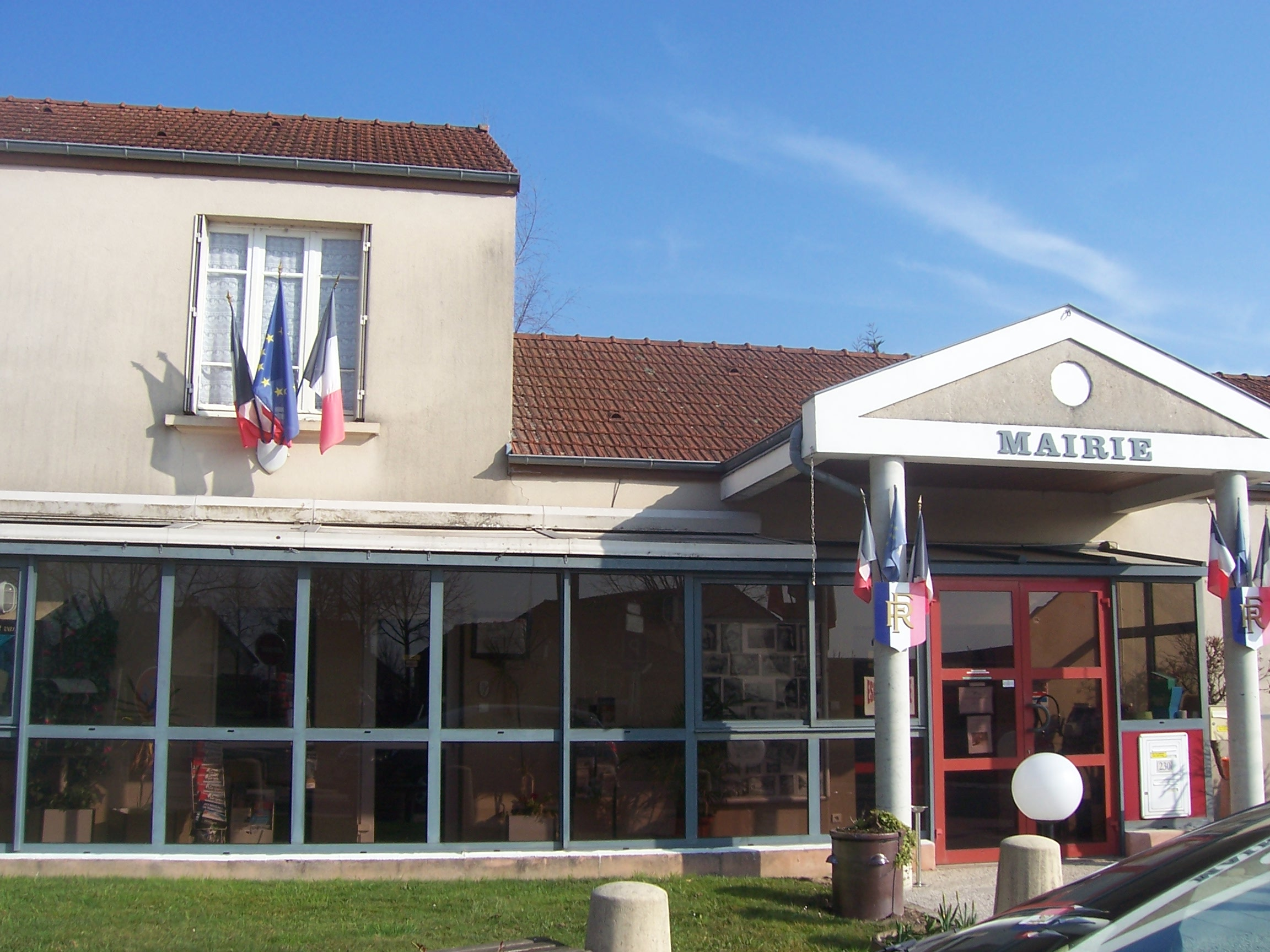
Town hall

== See also ==
- Communes of the Saône-et-Loire department
