= Mont-Saint-Vincent =

- Commune
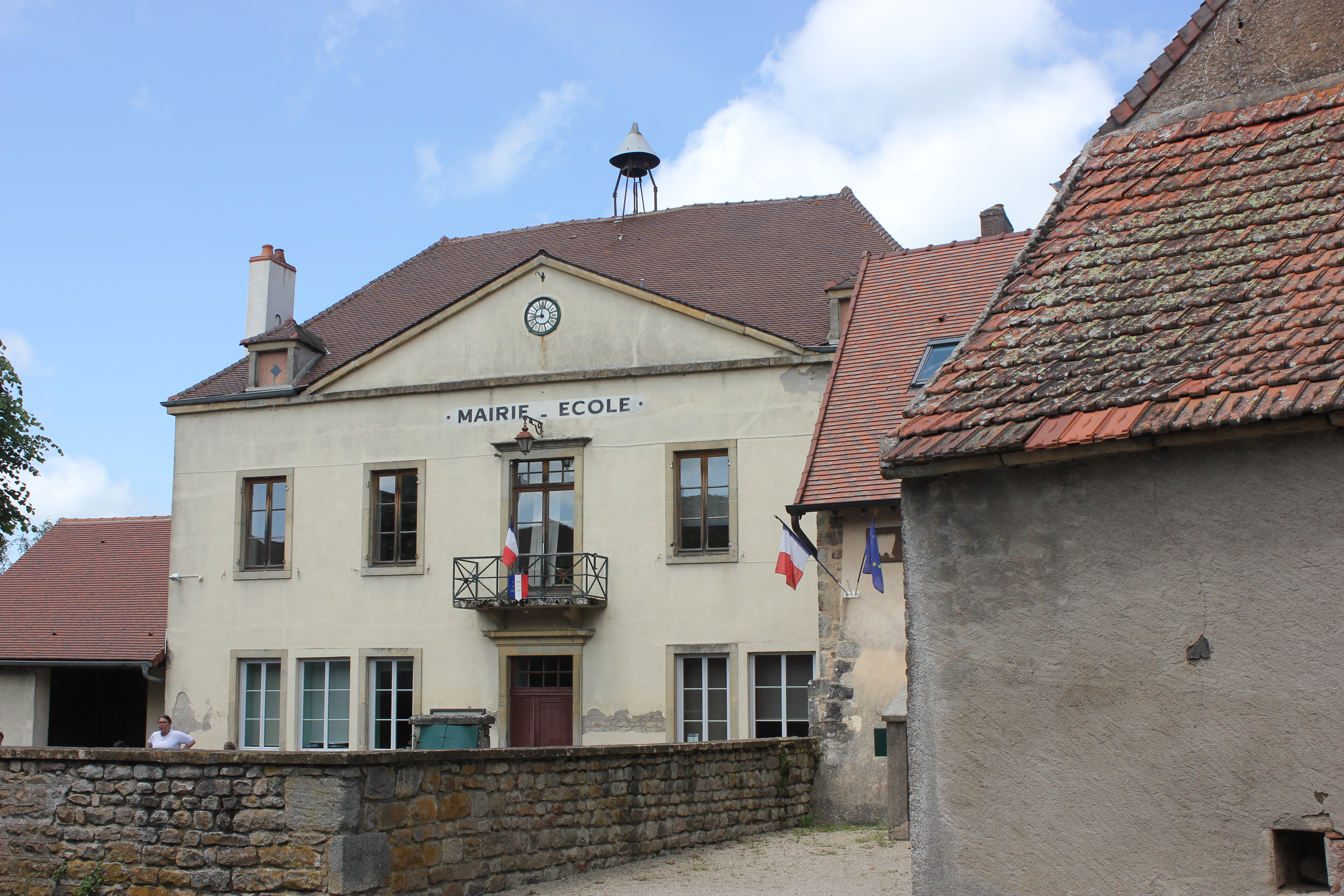
- The town hall in Mont-Saint-Vincent
- Location of Mont-Saint-Vincent
- Location within France Location within Bourgogne-Franche-Comté
- Coordinates: 46°37′53″N 4°28′45″E
- Country: France
- Region: Bourgogne-Franche-Comté
- Department: Saône-et-Loire
- Arrondissement: Autun
- Canton: Blanzy
- Intercommunality: CU Creusot Montceau

Government
  - Mayor (2020–2026): Jean Girardon
- Area^{1}: 13.6 km^{2} (5.3 sq mi)
- Elevation: 603 m (1,978 ft)
- Highest elevation: 601 m (1,972 ft)
- Lowest elevation: 320 m (1,050 ft)
- Population (2023): 308
  - Density: 22.6/km^{2} (58.7/sq mi)
- Time zone: UTC+01:00 (CET)
  - Summer (DST): UTC+02:00 (CEST)
- INSEE/Postal code: 71320 /71300
- ^{1} French Land Register data, which excludes lakes, ponds, glaciers > 1 km^{2} (0.386 sq mi or 247 acres) and river estuaries.

Mont-Saint-Vincent (French pronunciation: [mɔ̃ sɛ̃ vɛ̃sɑ̃]) is a commune in the Saône-et-Loire department in the region of Bourgogne-Franche-Comté in eastern France.

== Climate ==
Climate data for Mont-Saint-Vincent, elevation: 601 m (1,972 ft) (1991–2020 normals, extremes 1943-present)
Month	Jan	Feb	Mar	Apr	May	Jun	Jul	Aug	Sep	Oct	Nov	Dec	Year
Record high °C (°F)	16.4 (61.5)	21.3 (70.3)	22.3 (72.1)	26.2 (79.2)	30.7 (87.3)	34.7 (94.5)	37.2 (99.0)	37.6 (99.7)	31.8 (89.2)	27.3 (81.1)	21.3 (70.3)	17.2 (63.0)	37.6 (99.7)
Mean daily maximum °C (°F)	4.3 (39.7)	5.6 (42.1)	10.0 (50.0)	13.8 (56.8)	17.7 (63.9)	21.6 (70.9)	24.0 (75.2)	23.9 (75.0)	19.2 (66.6)	14.0 (57.2)	8.3 (46.9)	5.2 (41.4)	14.0 (57.2)
Daily mean °C (°F)	2.0 (35.6)	2.9 (37.2)	6.5 (43.7)	9.6 (49.3)	13.4 (56.1)	17.1 (62.8)	19.3 (66.7)	19.3 (66.7)	15.2 (59.4)	11.0 (51.8)	5.8 (42.4)	2.9 (37.2)	10.4 (50.7)
Mean daily minimum °C (°F)	−0.3 (31.5)	0.1 (32.2)	2.9 (37.2)	5.5 (41.9)	9.1 (48.4)	12.5 (54.5)	14.6 (58.3)	14.7 (58.5)	11.2 (52.2)	7.9 (46.2)	3.3 (37.9)	0.7 (33.3)	6.9 (44.4)
Record low °C (°F)	−18.1 (−0.6)	−21.1 (−6.0)	−13.2 (8.2)	−5.9 (21.4)	−2.3 (27.9)	2.0 (35.6)	5.2 (41.4)	4.7 (40.5)	1.7 (35.1)	−4.2 (24.4)	−9.6 (14.7)	−16.2 (2.8)	−21.1 (−6.0)
Average precipitation mm (inches)	69.5 (2.74)	56.3 (2.22)	61.6 (2.43)	66.8 (2.63)	87.7 (3.45)	71.6 (2.82)	81.0 (3.19)	71.4 (2.81)	71.0 (2.80)	85.1 (3.35)	91.8 (3.61)	77.4 (3.05)	891.2 (35.09)
Average precipitation days (≥ 1.0 mm)	11.5	10.0	9.8	9.8	11.3	9.3	8.9	8.1	8.8	11.4	12.7	12.8	124.5
Mean monthly sunshine hours	73.4	100.1	161.9	190.0	208.3	243.8	264.5	239.0	187.2	129.9	82.7	69.2	1,949.9
Source: Meteociel

== See also ==
- Communes of the Saône-et-Loire department
