= Mary, Saône-et-Loire =

Mary
- Commune
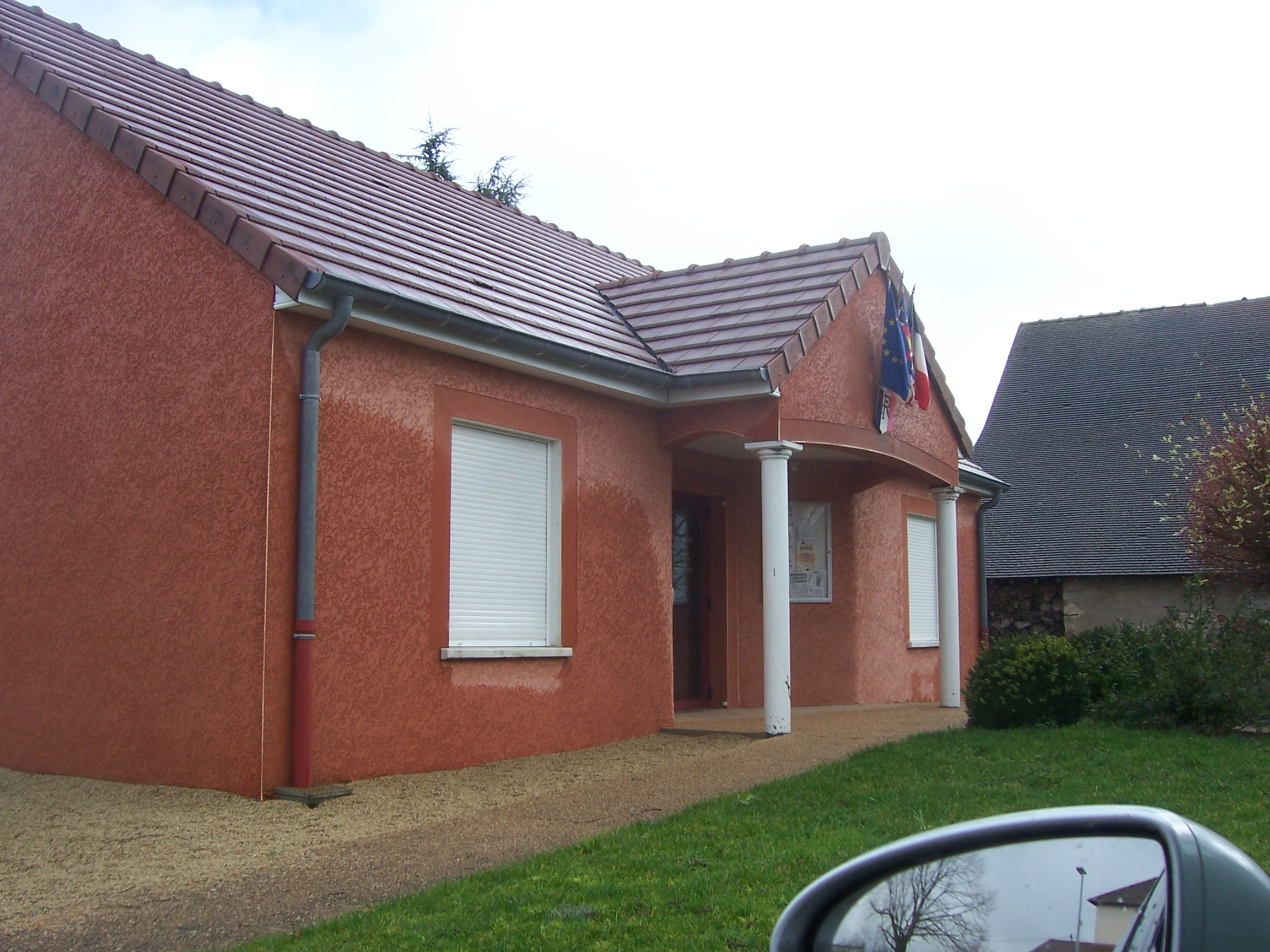
- The town hall in Mary
- Location of Mary
- Location within France Location within Bourgogne-Franche-Comté
- Coordinates: 46°37′05″N 4°30′32″E
- Country: France
- Region: Bourgogne-Franche-Comté
- Department: Saône-et-Loire
- Arrondissement: Autun
- Canton: Blanzy
- Intercommunality: CU Creusot Montceau
- Area^{1}: 14.55 km^{2} (5.62 sq mi)
- Elevation: 460 m (1,510 ft)
- Highest elevation: 537 m (1,762 ft)
- Lowest elevation: 290 m (950 ft)
- Population (2023): 281
  - Density: 19.3/km^{2} (50.0/sq mi)
- Time zone: UTC+01:00 (CET)
  - Summer (DST): UTC+02:00 (CEST)
- INSEE/Postal code: 71286 /71300
- ^{1} French Land Register data, which excludes lakes, ponds, glaciers > 1 km^{2} (0.386 sq mi or 247 acres) and river estuaries.

Mary (French pronunciation: [maʁi]) is a commune in the Saône-et-Loire department in the region of Bourgogne-Franche-Comté in eastern France.

== Geography ==
The river Arconce has its source in the commune.

== See also ==
- Communes of the Saône-et-Loire department
