= Collonge-en-Charollais =

- Commune
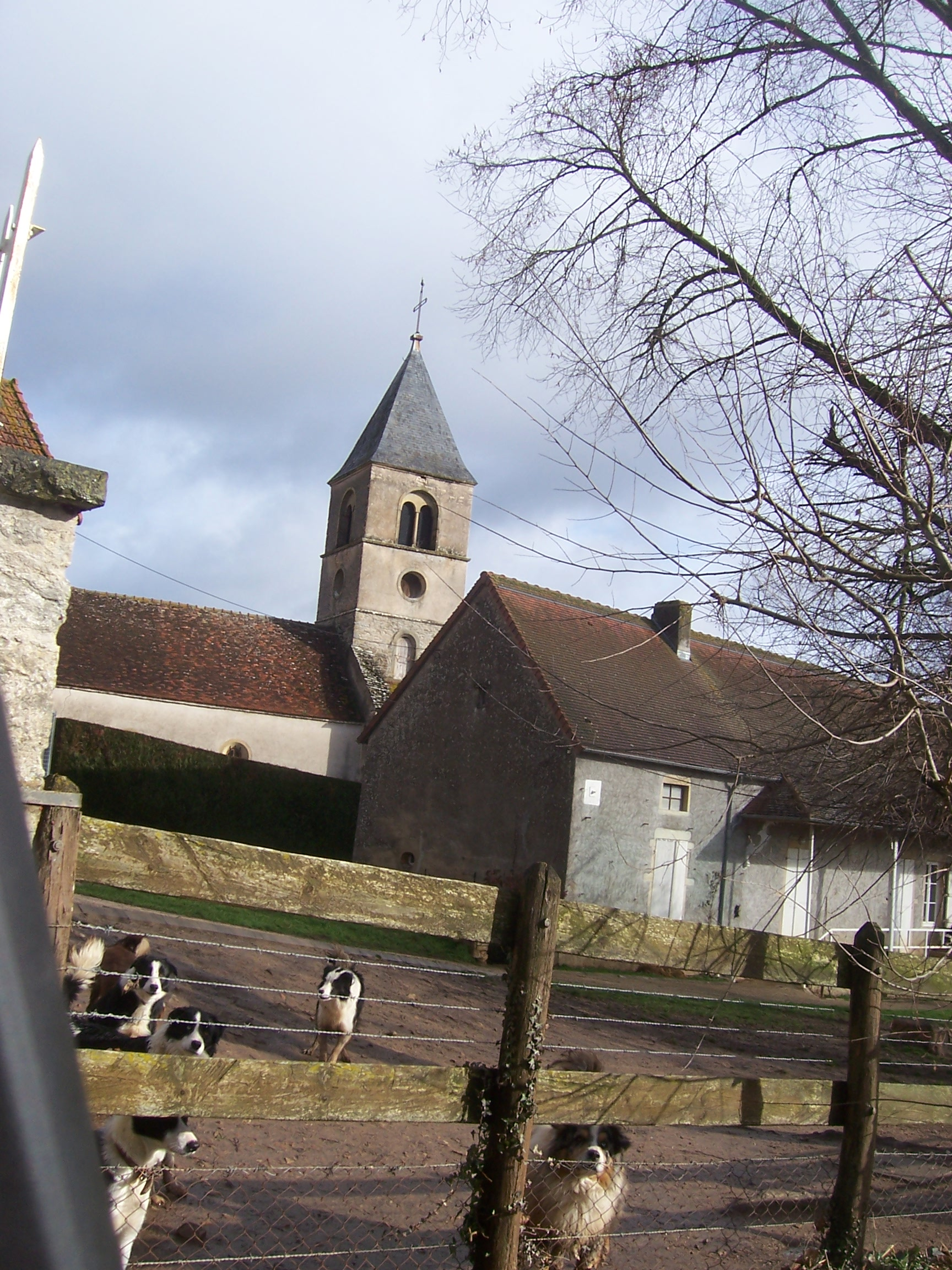
- The church and surroundings in Collonge-en-Charollais
- Location of Collonge-en-Charollais
- Location within France Location within Bourgogne-Franche-Comté
- Coordinates: 46°38′32″N 4°32′24″E
- Country: France
- Region: Bourgogne-Franche-Comté
- Department: Saône-et-Loire
- Arrondissement: Chalon-sur-Saône
- Canton: Blanzy
- Area^{1}: 12.17 km^{2} (4.70 sq mi)
- Elevation: 350 m (1,150 ft)
- Highest elevation: 489 m (1,604 ft)
- Lowest elevation: 234 m (768 ft)
- Population (2023): 151
  - Density: 12.4/km^{2} (32.1/sq mi)
- Time zone: UTC+01:00 (CET)
  - Summer (DST): UTC+02:00 (CEST)
- INSEE/Postal code: 71139 /71460
- ^{1} French Land Register data, which excludes lakes, ponds, glaciers > 1 km^{2} (0.386 sq mi or 247 acres) and river estuaries.

Collonge-en-Charollais is a commune in the Saône-et-Loire department in the region of Bourgogne-Franche-Comté in eastern France.

== See also ==
- Communes of the Saône-et-Loire department
