= Canton of Blanzy =

Coordinates: 46.70°N 4.39°E

The canton of Blanzy is an administrative division of the Saône-et-Loire department, eastern France. It was created at the French canton reorganisation which came into effect in March 2015. Its seat is in Blanzy.

It consists of the following communes:

1. Les Bizots
2. Blanzy
3. Collonge-en-Charollais
4. Écuisses
5. Genouilly
6. Gourdon
7. Joncy
8. Marigny
9. Mary
10. Mont-Saint-Vincent
11. Montchanin
12. Le Puley
13. Saint-Eusèbe
14. Saint-Julien-sur-Dheune
15. Saint-Laurent-d'Andenay
16. Saint-Martin-la-Patrouille
17. Saint-Micaud
