= Torcy, Saône-et-Loire =

Torcy
- Commune
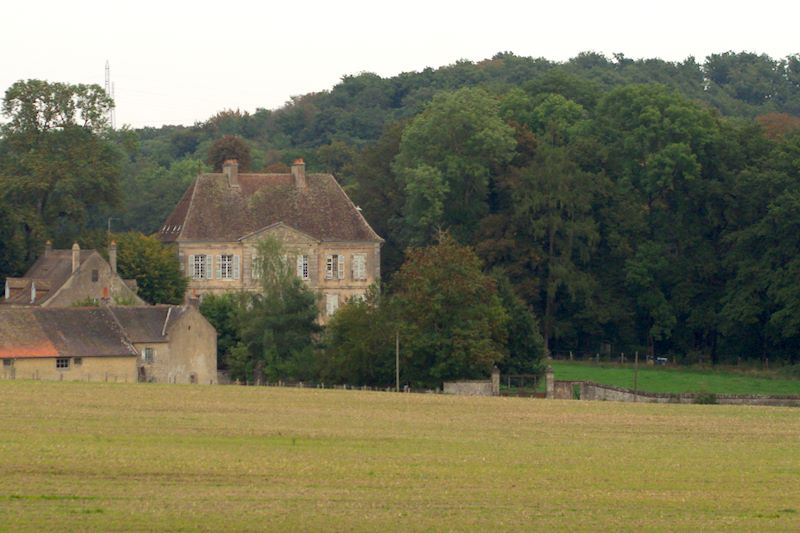
- Chateau
- Location of Torcy
- Location within France Location within Bourgogne-Franche-Comté
- Coordinates: 46°47′03″N 4°26′11″E
- Country: France
- Region: Bourgogne-Franche-Comté
- Department: Saône-et-Loire
- Arrondissement: Autun
- Canton: Le Creusot-1
- Intercommunality: CU Creusot Montceau

Government
  - Mayor (2020–2026): Philippe Pigeau
- Area^{1}: 19.62 km^{2} (7.58 sq mi)
- Elevation: 313 m (1,027 ft)
- Highest elevation: 362 m (1,188 ft)
- Lowest elevation: 294 m (965 ft)
- Population (2023): 2,678
  - Density: 136.5/km^{2} (353.5/sq mi)
- Time zone: UTC+01:00 (CET)
  - Summer (DST): UTC+02:00 (CEST)
- INSEE/Postal code: 71540 /71210
- ^{1} French Land Register data, which excludes lakes, ponds, glaciers > 1 km^{2} (0.386 sq mi or 247 acres) and river estuaries.

Torcy (French pronunciation: [tɔʁsi]) is a commune in the Saône-et-Loire department in the region of Bourgogne-Franche-Comté in eastern France.

== Geography ==
The Bourbince flows through the middle of the commune.

== Population ==
Historical population
Year	Pop.	±% p.a.
1968	1,541	—
1975	4,400	+16.17%
1982	4,865	+1.45%
1990	4,059	−2.24%
1999	3,554	−1.47%
2007	3,035	−1.95%
2012	3,169	+0.87%
2017	2,960	−1.36%
2023	2,678	−1.65%
Source: INSEE

== See also ==
- Communes of the Saône-et-Loire department
