= Saint-Eusèbe, Saône-et-Loire =

Saint-Eusèbe
- Commune
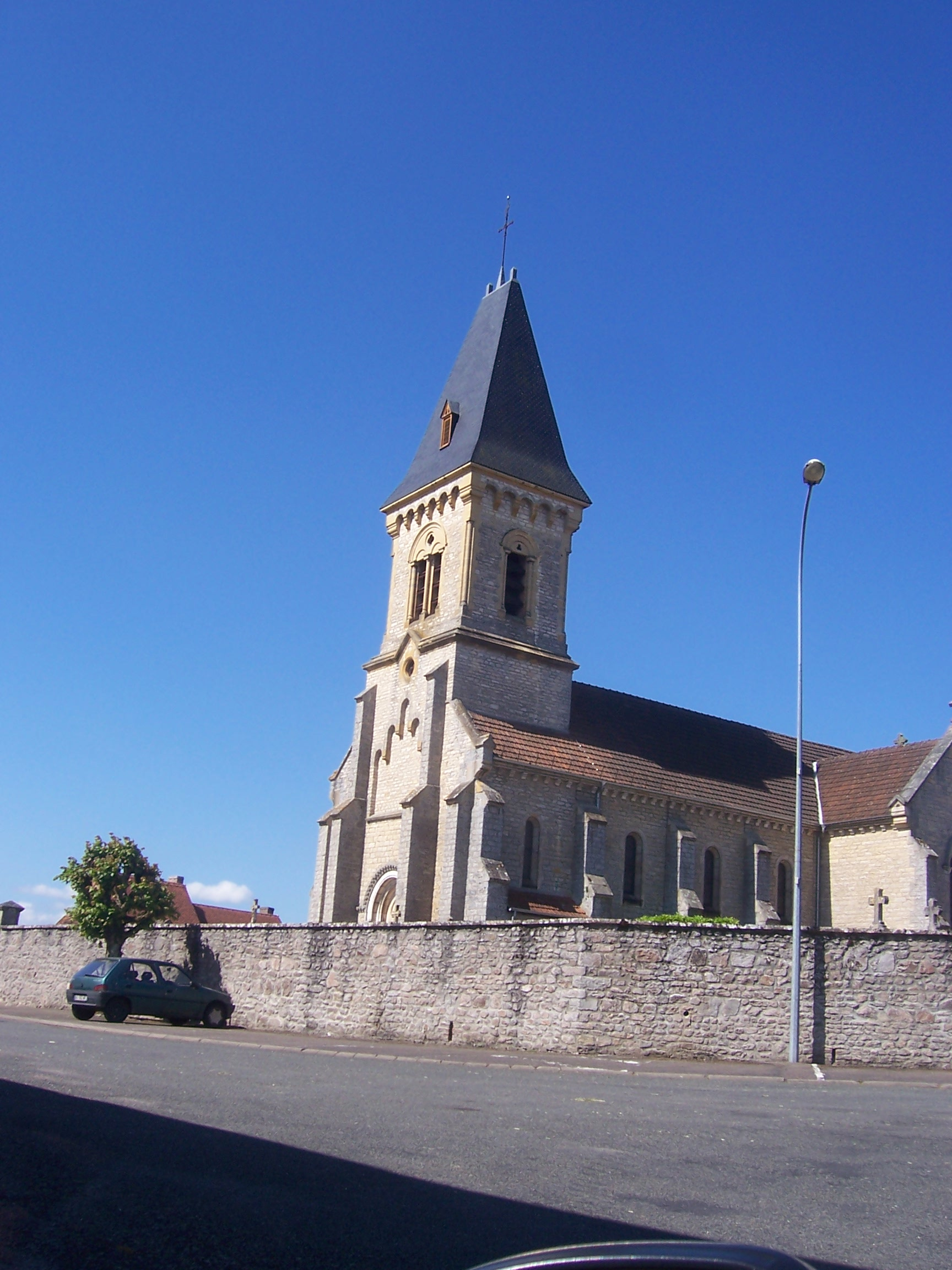
- The church in Saint-Eusèbe
- Location of Saint-Eusèbe
- Location within France Location within Bourgogne-Franche-Comté
- Coordinates: 46°42′51″N 4°27′43″E
- Country: France
- Region: Bourgogne-Franche-Comté
- Department: Saône-et-Loire
- Arrondissement: Autun
- Canton: Blanzy
- Intercommunality: CU Creusot Montceau

Government
  - Mayor (2024–2026): Fabrice Vesvres
- Area^{1}: 21.21 km^{2} (8.19 sq mi)
- Elevation: 320 m (1,050 ft)
- Highest elevation: 401 m (1,316 ft)
- Lowest elevation: 284 m (932 ft)
- Population (2023): 1,147
  - Density: 54.08/km^{2} (140.1/sq mi)
- Time zone: UTC+01:00 (CET)
  - Summer (DST): UTC+02:00 (CEST)
- INSEE/Postal code: 71412 /71210
- ^{1} French Land Register data, which excludes lakes, ponds, glaciers > 1 km^{2} (0.386 sq mi or 247 acres) and river estuaries.

Saint-Eusèbe (French pronunciation: [sɛ̃.t‿øzɛb]) is a commune in the Saône-et-Loire department in the region of Bourgogne-Franche-Comté in eastern France.

== Geography ==
The Bourbince forms the commune's western border.

== See also ==
- Communes of the Saône-et-Loire department
