= Joncy =

- Commune
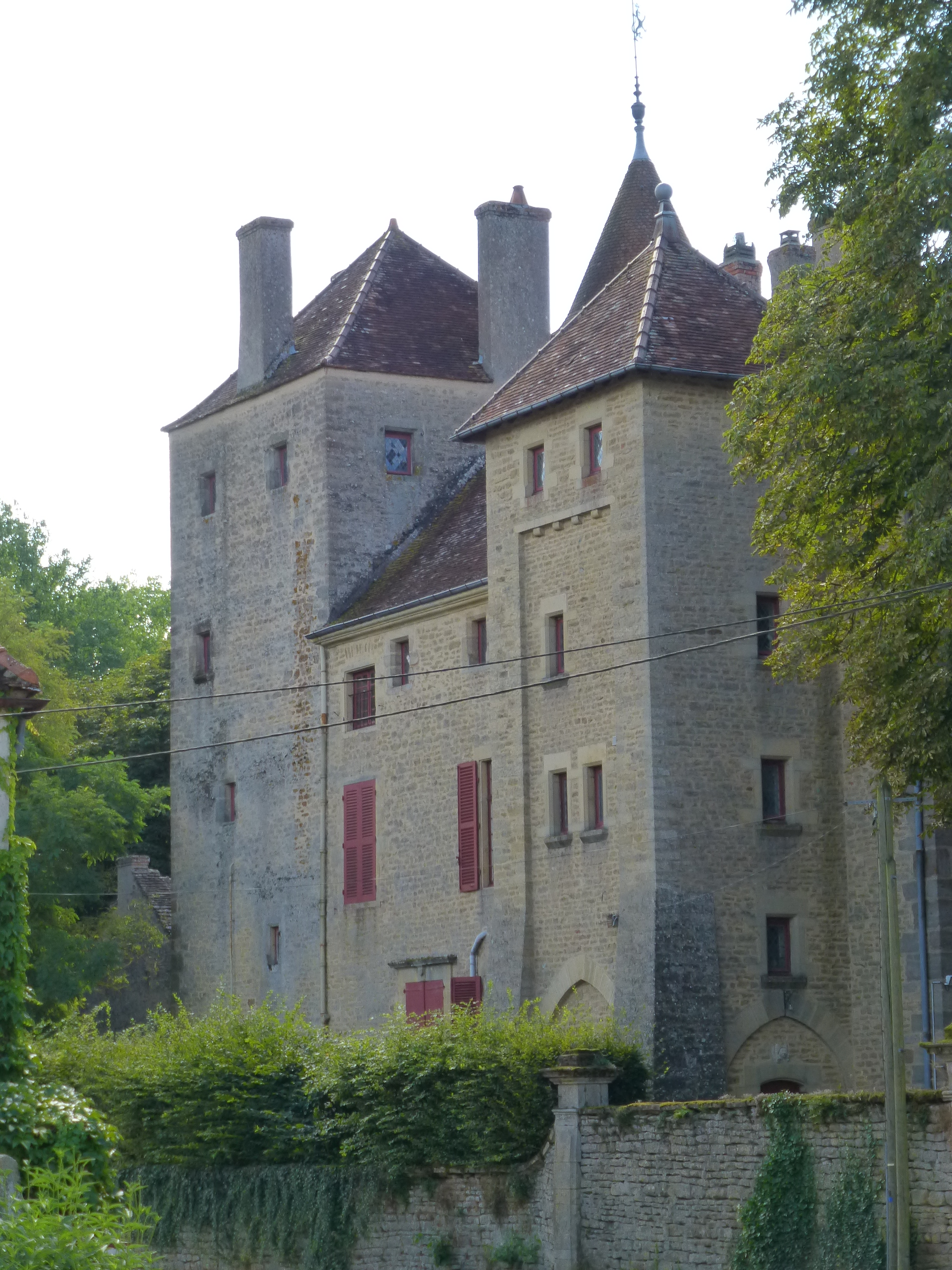
- The chateau in Joncy
- Location of Joncy
- Location within France Location within Bourgogne-Franche-Comté
- Coordinates: 46°36′51″N 4°33′32″E
- Country: France
- Region: Bourgogne-Franche-Comté
- Department: Saône-et-Loire
- Arrondissement: Mâcon
- Canton: Blanzy
- Intercommunality: CC du Clunisois

Government
  - Mayor (2020–2026): Christian Morelli
- Area^{1}: 15.15 km^{2} (5.85 sq mi)
- Elevation: 220 m (720 ft)
- Highest elevation: 450 m (1,480 ft)
- Lowest elevation: 222 m (728 ft)
- Population (2023): 510
  - Density: 34/km^{2} (87/sq mi)
- Time zone: UTC+01:00 (CET)
  - Summer (DST): UTC+02:00 (CEST)
- INSEE/Postal code: 71242 /71460
- ^{1} French Land Register data, which excludes lakes, ponds, glaciers > 1 km^{2} (0.386 sq mi or 247 acres) and river estuaries.

Joncy (French pronunciation: [ʒɔ̃si]) is a commune in the Saône-et-Loire department in the region of Bourgogne-Franche-Comté in eastern France.

== See also ==
- Communes of the Saône-et-Loire department
