= Marigny, Saône-et-Loire =

Marigny
- Commune
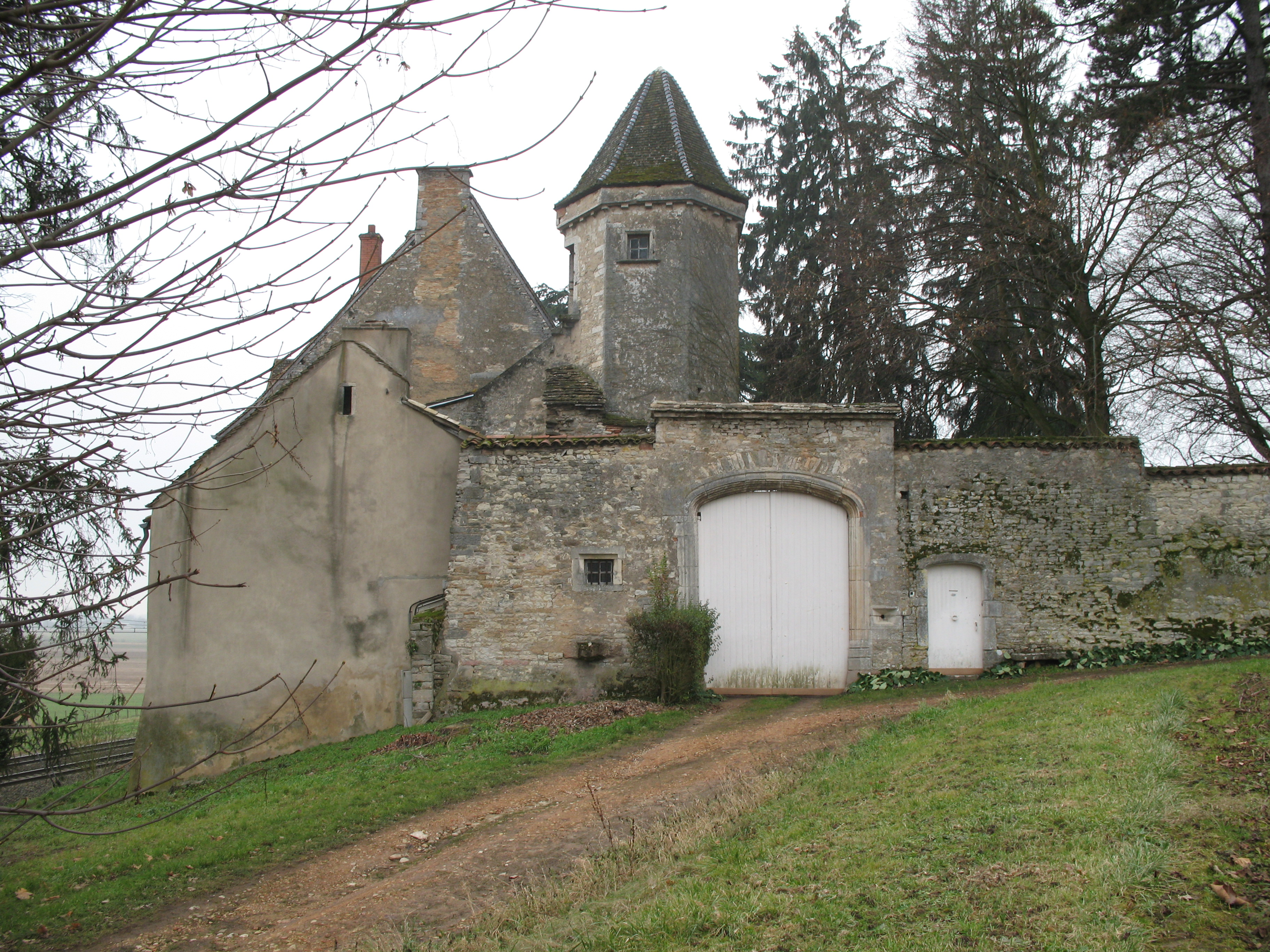
- Chateau
- Location of Marigny
- Location within France Location within Bourgogne-Franche-Comté
- Coordinates: 46°40′47″N 4°27′36″E
- Country: France
- Region: Bourgogne-Franche-Comté
- Department: Saône-et-Loire
- Arrondissement: Autun
- Canton: Blanzy
- Intercommunality: CU Creusot Montceau

Government
  - Mayor (2020–2026): Paulette Matray
- Area^{1}: 22.3 km^{2} (8.6 sq mi)
- Highest elevation: 431 m (1,414 ft)
- Lowest elevation: 288 m (945 ft)
- Population (2023): 166
  - Density: 7.44/km^{2} (19.3/sq mi)
- Time zone: UTC+01:00 (CET)
  - Summer (DST): UTC+02:00 (CEST)
- INSEE/Postal code: 71278 /71300
- ^{1} French Land Register data, which excludes lakes, ponds, glaciers > 1 km^{2} (0.386 sq mi or 247 acres) and river estuaries.

Marigny (French pronunciation: [maʁiɲi]) is a commune in the Saône-et-Loire department in the region of Bourgogne-Franche-Comté in eastern France.

== See also ==
- Communes of the Saône-et-Loire department
