= Saint-Martin-la-Patrouille =

- Commune
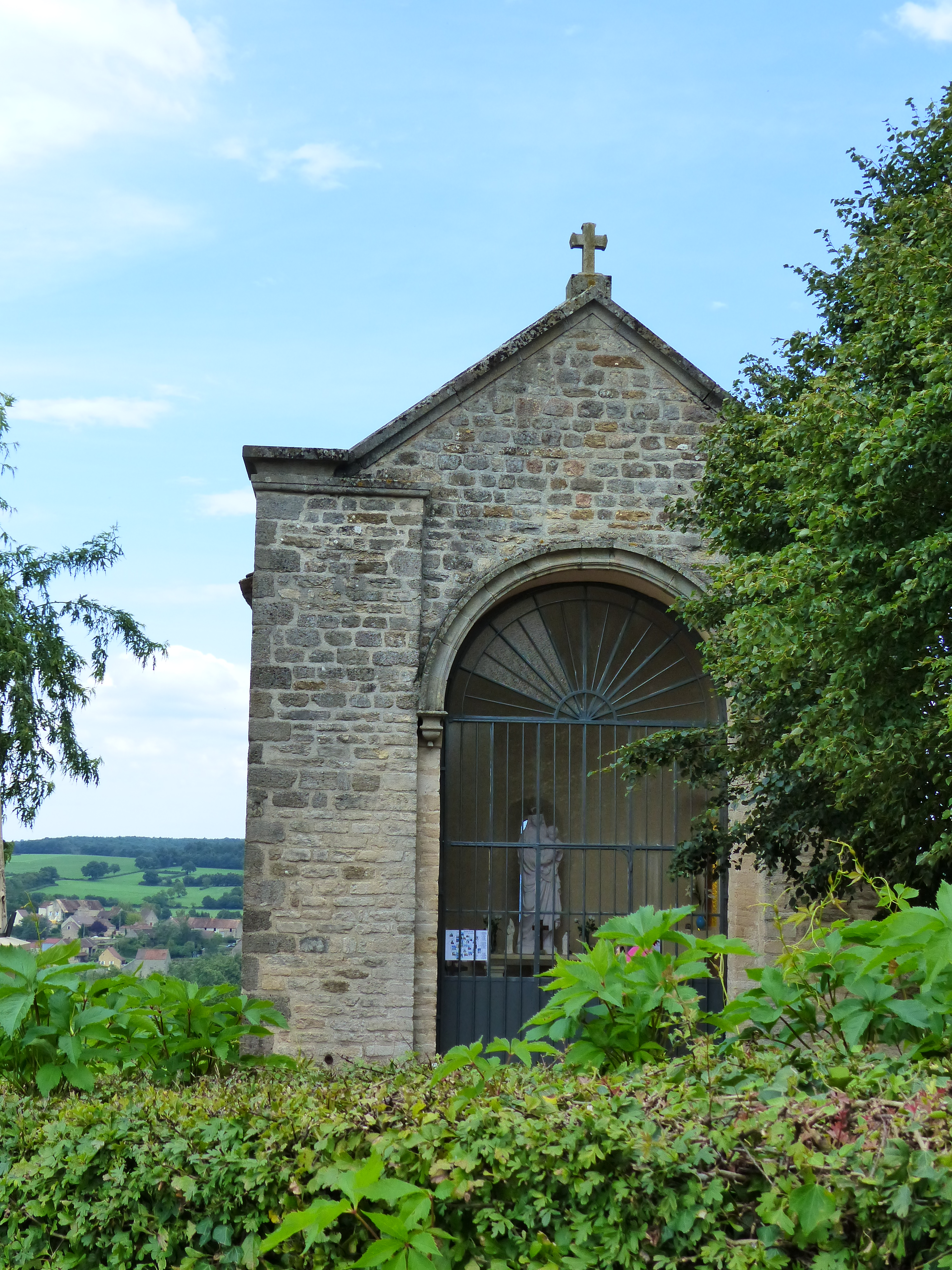
- The chapel in Saint-Martin-la-Patrouille
- Location of Saint-Martin-la-Patrouille
- Location within France Location within Bourgogne-Franche-Comté
- Coordinates: 46°34′59″N 4°33′18″E
- Country: France
- Region: Bourgogne-Franche-Comté
- Department: Saône-et-Loire
- Arrondissement: Mâcon
- Canton: Blanzy
- Area^{1}: 6.76 km^{2} (2.61 sq mi)
- Elevation: 260 m (850 ft)
- Highest elevation: 370 m (1,210 ft)
- Lowest elevation: 217 m (712 ft)
- Population (2023): 68
  - Density: 10/km^{2} (26/sq mi)
- Time zone: UTC+01:00 (CET)
  - Summer (DST): UTC+02:00 (CEST)
- INSEE/Postal code: 71458 /71460
- ^{1} French Land Register data, which excludes lakes, ponds, glaciers > 1 km^{2} (0.386 sq mi or 247 acres) and river estuaries.

Saint-Martin-la-Patrouille (French pronunciation: [sɛ̃ maʁtɛ̃ la patʁuj]) is a commune in the Saône-et-Loire department in the region of Bourgogne-Franche-Comté in eastern France.

== See also ==
- Communes of the Saône-et-Loire department
