= Saint-Julien-sur-Dheune =

- Commune
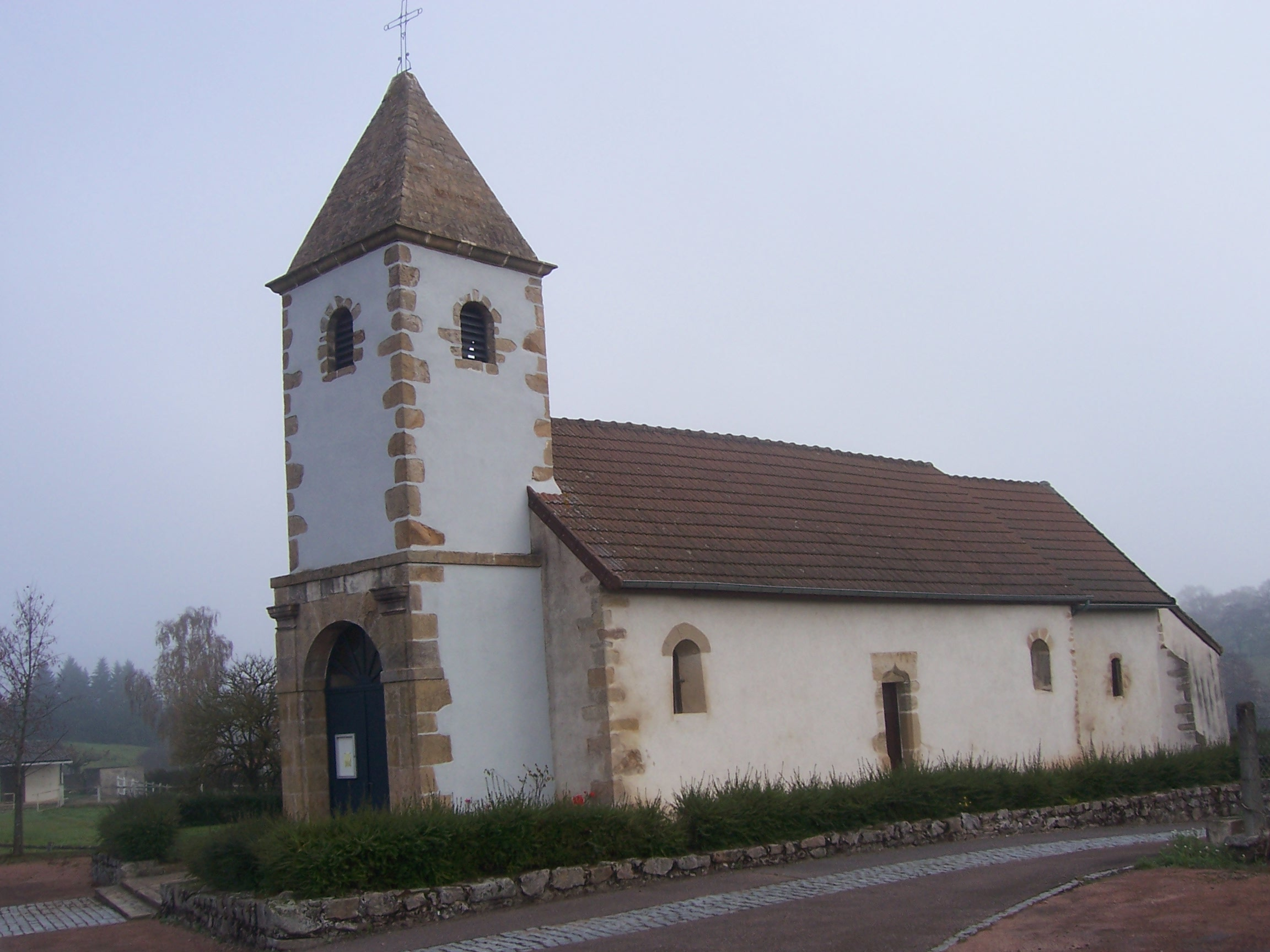
- The church in Saint-Julien-sur-Dheune
- Location of Saint-Julien-sur-Dheune
- Location within France Location within Bourgogne-Franche-Comté
- Coordinates: 46°46′25″N 4°32′44″E
- Country: France
- Region: Bourgogne-Franche-Comté
- Department: Saône-et-Loire
- Arrondissement: Autun
- Canton: Blanzy
- Intercommunality: CU Creusot Montceau
- Area^{1}: 5.32 km^{2} (2.05 sq mi)
- Elevation: 268 m (879 ft)
- Highest elevation: 367 m (1,204 ft)
- Lowest elevation: 252 m (827 ft)
- Population (2023): 226
  - Density: 42.5/km^{2} (110/sq mi)
- Time zone: UTC+01:00 (CET)
  - Summer (DST): UTC+02:00 (CEST)
- INSEE/Postal code: 71435 /71210
- ^{1} French Land Register data, which excludes lakes, ponds, glaciers > 1 km^{2} (0.386 sq mi or 247 acres) and river estuaries.

Saint-Julien-sur-Dheune (French pronunciation: [sɛ̃ ʒyljɛ̃ syʁ dœn], literally Saint-Julien on Dheune) is a commune in the Saône-et-Loire department in the region of Bourgogne-Franche-Comté in eastern France.

== See also ==
- Communes of the Saône-et-Loire department
