= Communauté urbaine Creusot Montceau =

Coordinates: 46.81°N 4.43°E

Creusot Montceau
- Communauté urbaine
- Country: France
- Region: Bourgogne-Franche-Comté
- Department: Saône-et-Loire
- No. of communes: {{{nbcomm}}}
- Established: 1970

Government
  - President (2020–2026): David Marti (PS)
- Area: 742.0 km^{2} (286.5 sq mi)
- Population (2018): 93,072
  - Density: 125.4/km^{2} (324.9/sq mi)
- Website: www.creusot-montceau.org

The Communauté urbaine Creusot Montceau (official name: Communauté urbaine Le Creusot – Montceau les Mines) is the communauté urbaine, an intercommunal structure, centred on the cities of Le Creusot and Montceau-les-Mines. It is located in the Saône-et-Loire department, in the Bourgogne-Franche-Comté region, eastern France. It was created in 1970. Its area is 742.0 km^{2}. Its population was 93,072 in 2018, of which 21,491 in Le Creusot and 17,897 in Montceau-les-Mines.

== Member communes ==
The Communauté urbaine Creusot Montceau consists of the following 34 communes:

- Blanzy
- Charmoy
- Ciry-le-Noble
- Écuisses
- Essertenne
- Génelard
- Gourdon
- Le Breuil
- Le Creusot
- Les Bizots
- Marigny
- Marmagne
- Mary
- Montceau-les-Mines
- Montcenis
- Montchanin
- Mont-Saint-Vincent
- Morey
- Perrecy-les-Forges
- Perreuil
- Pouilloux
- Saint-Berain-sous-Sanvignes
- Saint-Eusèbe
- Saint-Firmin
- Saint-Julien-sur-Dheune
- Saint-Laurent-d'Andenay
- Saint-Micaud
- Saint-Pierre-de-Varennes
- Saint-Romain-sous-Gourdon
- Saint-Sernin-du-Bois
- Saint-Symphorien-de-Marmagne
- Saint-Vallier
- Sanvignes-les-Mines
- Torcy
