= Gourdon, Saône-et-Loire =

Gourdon
- Commune
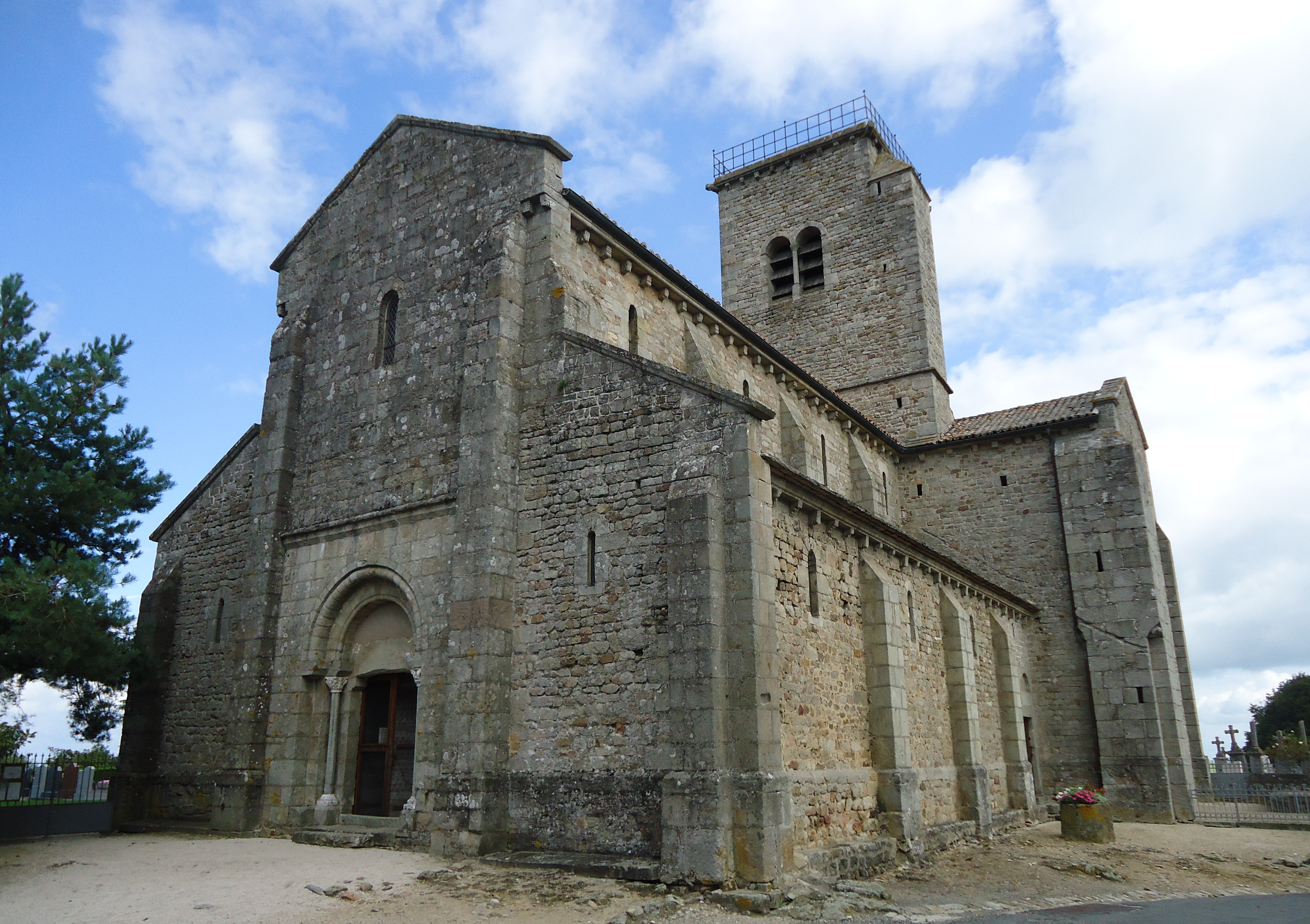
- The church in Gourdon
- Location of Gourdon
- Location within France Location within Bourgogne-Franche-Comté
- Coordinates: 46°38′29″N 4°26′53″E
- Country: France
- Region: Bourgogne-Franche-Comté
- Department: Saône-et-Loire
- Arrondissement: Autun
- Canton: Blanzy
- Intercommunality: CU Creusot Montceau
- Area^{1}: 25.41 km^{2} (9.81 sq mi)
- Elevation: 475 m (1,558 ft)
- Highest elevation: 518 m (1,699 ft)
- Lowest elevation: 288 m (945 ft)
- Population (2023): 893
  - Density: 35.1/km^{2} (91.0/sq mi)
- Time zone: UTC+01:00 (CET)
  - Summer (DST): UTC+02:00 (CEST)
- INSEE/Postal code: 71222 /71300
- ^{1} French Land Register data, which excludes lakes, ponds, glaciers > 1 km^{2} (0.386 sq mi or 247 acres) and river estuaries.

Gourdon (French pronunciation: [ɡuʁdɔ̃]) is a commune in the Saône-et-Loire department in the region of Bourgogne-Franche-Comté in eastern France.

The Treasure of Gourdon is a hoard of gold objects buried around the year 524 and unearthed in 1845 in the commune, which date to the end of the fifth or the beginning of the sixth century.

== Geography ==
The Arconce forms part of the commune's southeastern border.

== See also ==
- Communes of the Saône-et-Loire department
