= Montcenis =

- Commune
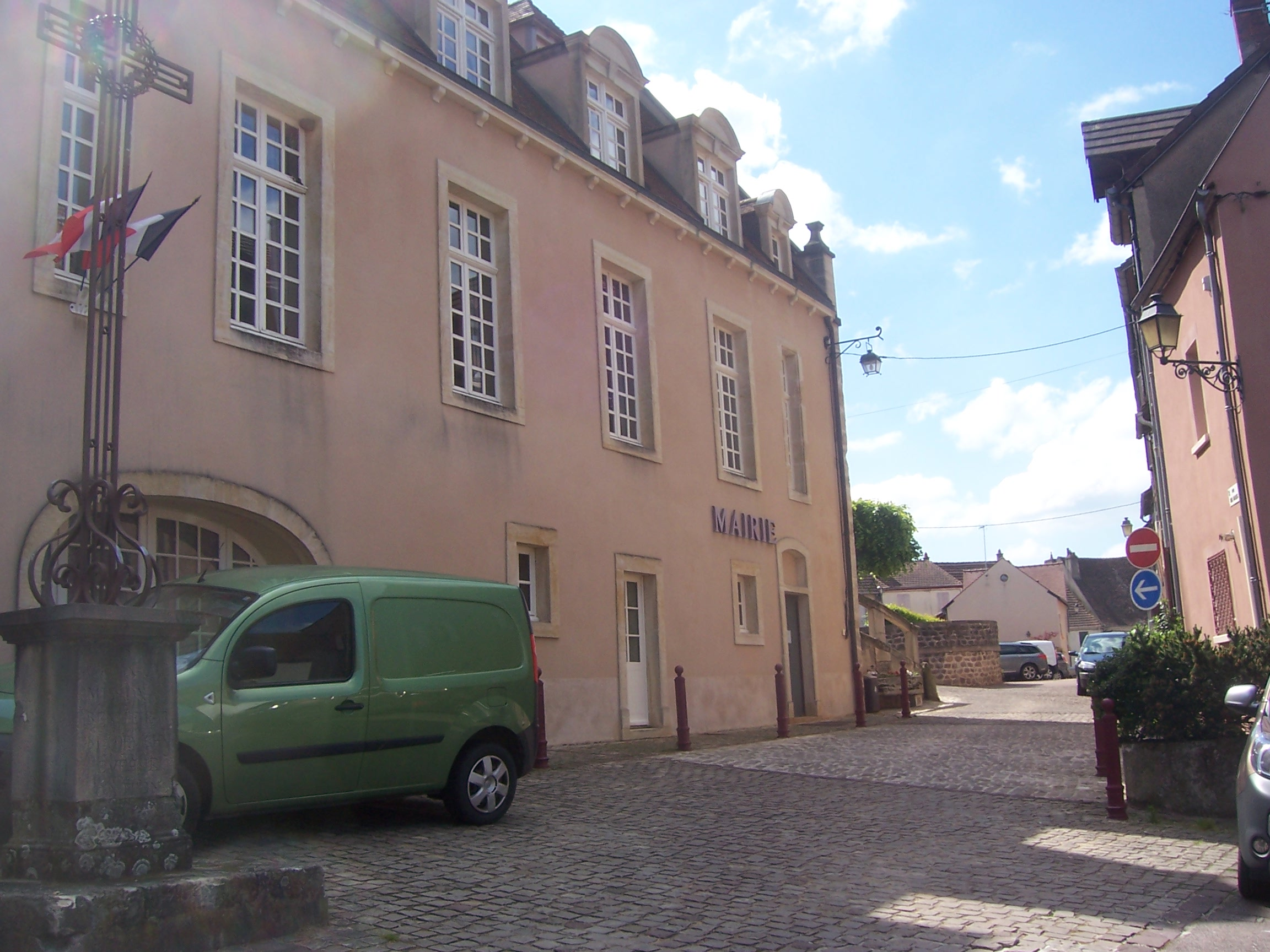
- Town hall

- Coat of arms
- Location of Montcenis
- Location within France Location within Bourgogne-Franche-Comté
- Coordinates: 46°47′29″N 4°23′23″E
- Country: France
- Region: Bourgogne-Franche-Comté
- Department: Saône-et-Loire
- Arrondissement: Autun
- Canton: Le Creusot-1
- Intercommunality: CU Creusot Montceau

Government
  - Mayor (2020–2026): Thierry Buisson
- Area^{1}: 12.33 km^{2} (4.76 sq mi)
- Elevation: 420 m (1,380 ft)
- Highest elevation: 513 m (1,683 ft)
- Lowest elevation: 310 m (1,020 ft)
- Population (2023): 1,923
  - Density: 156.0/km^{2} (403.9/sq mi)
- Time zone: UTC+01:00 (CET)
  - Summer (DST): UTC+02:00 (CEST)
- INSEE/Postal code: 71309 /71710
- ^{1} French Land Register data, which excludes lakes, ponds, glaciers > 1 km^{2} (0.386 sq mi or 247 acres) and river estuaries.

Montcenis (French pronunciation: [mɔ̃səni]) is a commune in the Saône-et-Loire department in the region of Bourgogne-Franche-Comté in eastern France.

== Geography ==
The Bourbince river has its source in the commune.

== See also ==
- Communes of the Saône-et-Loire department
