= Saint-Micaud =

- Commune
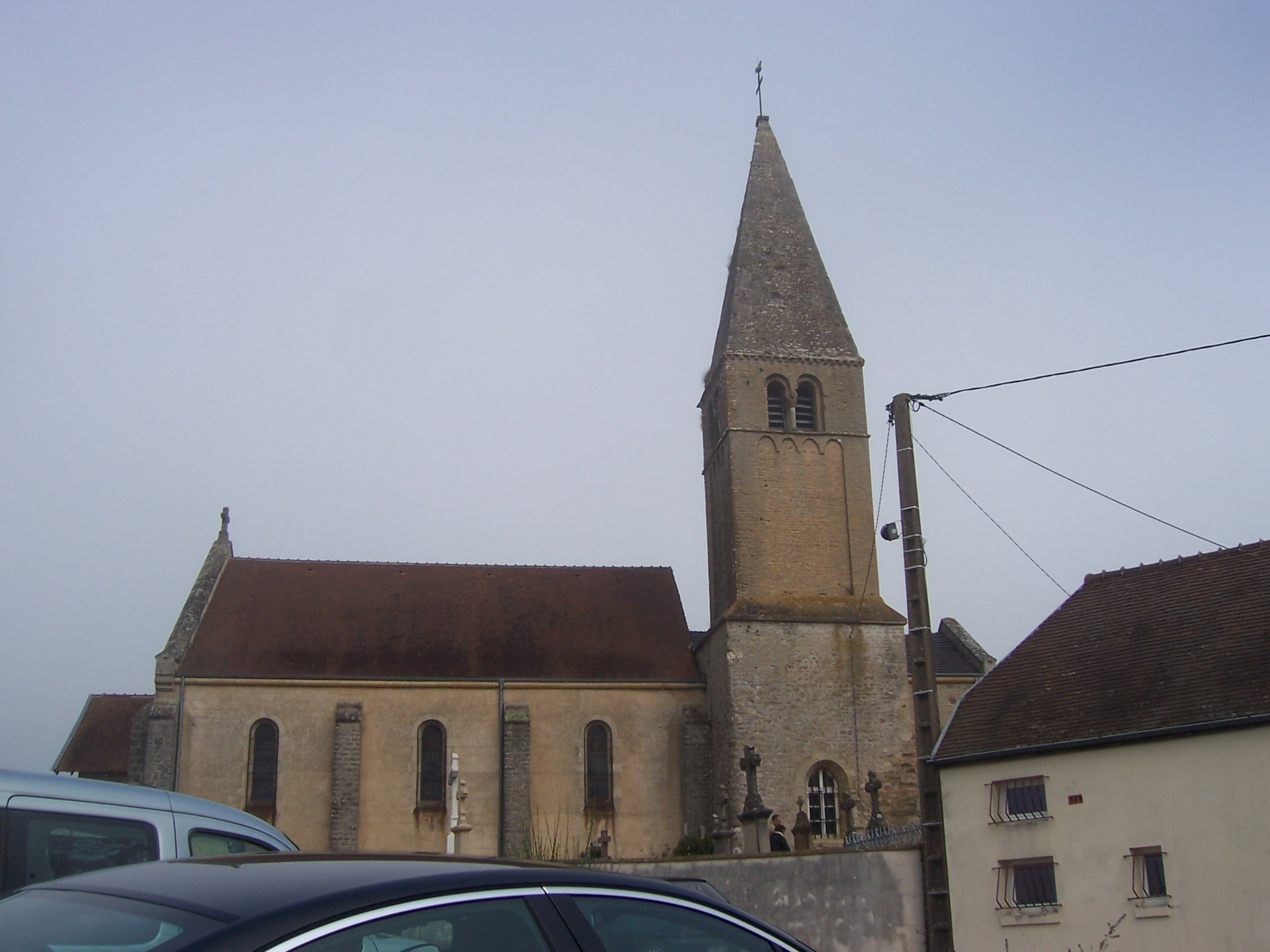
- The church in Saint-Micaud
- Location of Saint-Micaud
- Location within France Location within Bourgogne-Franche-Comté
- Coordinates: 46°41′32″N 4°32′51″E
- Country: France
- Region: Bourgogne-Franche-Comté
- Department: Saône-et-Loire
- Arrondissement: Autun
- Canton: Blanzy
- Intercommunality: CU Creusot Montceau

Government
  - Mayor (2023–2026): Aurélie Sivignon
- Area^{1}: 20.91 km^{2} (8.07 sq mi)
- Elevation: 260 m (850 ft)
- Highest elevation: 425 m (1,394 ft)
- Lowest elevation: 258 m (846 ft)
- Population (2023): 269
  - Density: 12.9/km^{2} (33.3/sq mi)
- Time zone: UTC+01:00 (CET)
  - Summer (DST): UTC+02:00 (CEST)
- INSEE/Postal code: 71465 /71460
- ^{1} French Land Register data, which excludes lakes, ponds, glaciers > 1 km^{2} (0.386 sq mi or 247 acres) and river estuaries.

Saint-Micaud (French pronunciation: [sɛ̃ miko]) is a commune in the Saône-et-Loire department in the region of Bourgogne-Franche-Comté in eastern France.

== See also ==
- Communes of the Saône-et-Loire department
