= Genouilly, Saône-et-Loire =

Genouilly
- Commune
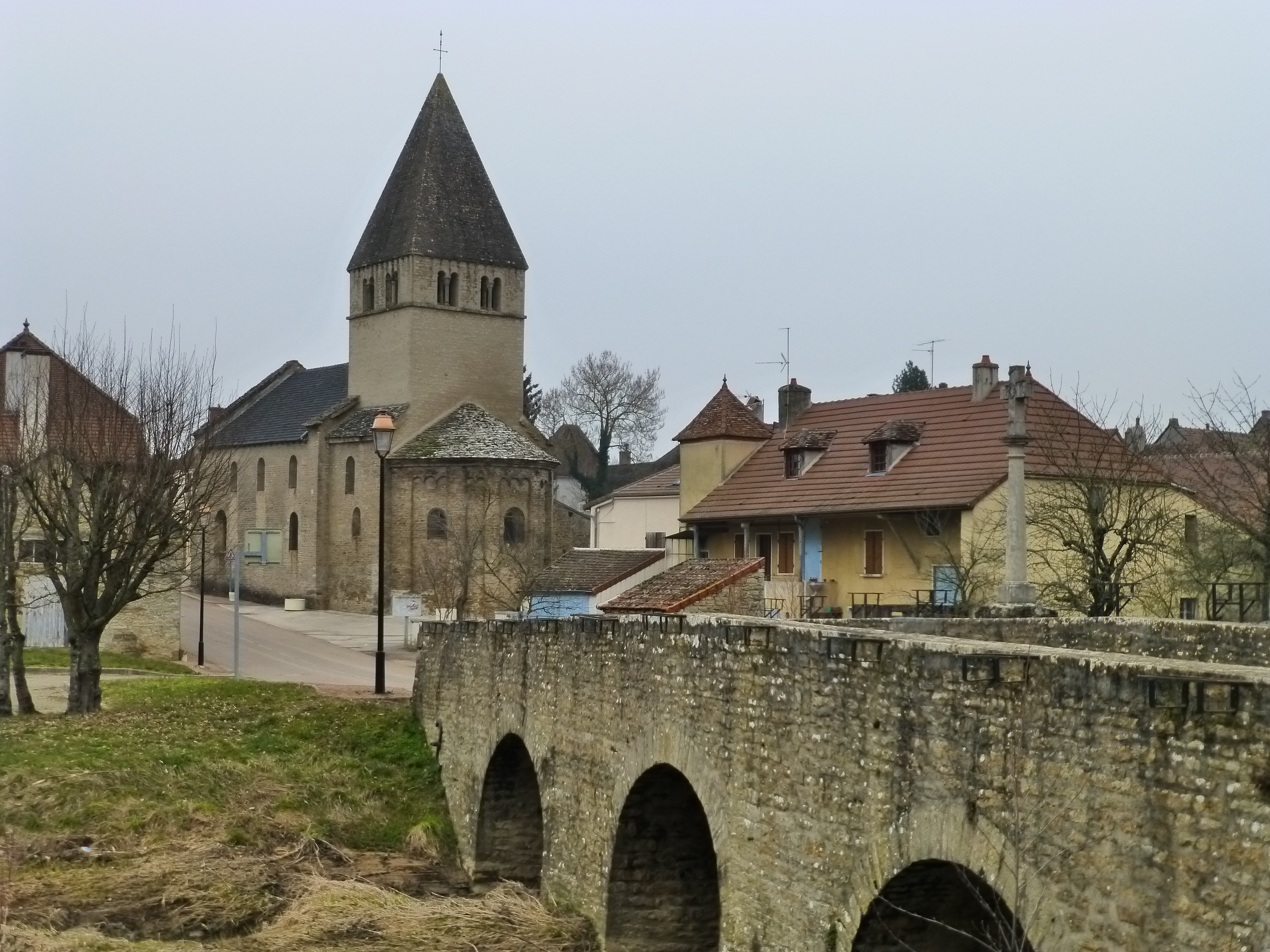
- The church and bridge in Genouilly
- Location of Genouilly
- Location within France Location within Bourgogne-Franche-Comté
- Coordinates: 46°39′07″N 4°34′28″E
- Country: France
- Region: Bourgogne-Franche-Comté
- Department: Saône-et-Loire
- Arrondissement: Chalon-sur-Saône
- Canton: Blanzy

Government
  - Mayor (2020–2026): Christelle Jandot
- Area^{1}: 10.88 km^{2} (4.20 sq mi)
- Elevation: 251 m (823 ft)
- Highest elevation: 485 m (1,591 ft)
- Lowest elevation: 233 m (764 ft)
- Population (2023): 418
  - Density: 38.4/km^{2} (99.5/sq mi)
- Time zone: UTC+01:00 (CET)
  - Summer (DST): UTC+02:00 (CEST)
- INSEE/Postal code: 71214 /71460
- ^{1} French Land Register data, which excludes lakes, ponds, glaciers > 1 km^{2} (0.386 sq mi or 247 acres) and river estuaries.

Genouilly (French pronunciation: [ʒənuji]) is a commune in the Saône-et-Loire department in the region of Bourgogne-Franche-Comté in eastern France.

== See also ==
- Communes of the Saône-et-Loire department
