= Barthélemy de Chasseneuz =

French jurist (1480–1541)

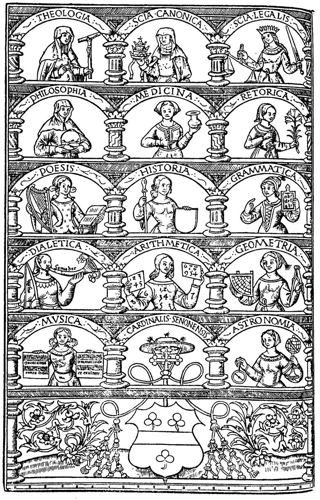
Illustration from de Chasseneuz's Catalogus gloriae mundi, showing the 14 arts.

Barthélemy de Chasseneuz (1480–1541) was a French jurist. His name has also been recorded as Cassaneus Bertalan, Bartholomaeus Cassaneus, Bartholomäus Cassaneus, Barthelemy de Chassenée, de Chassaneo, Bartholm Chasseneux, Chassanæus, Chassanaeus, Hassanaus, or Bartholomew Cassaneus.

De Chasseneuz studied law in Dole, Poitiers, Turin and Pavia under teachers such as Jason de Mayno, Filippo Decio, Franciscus Curtis junior and Rochus de Curte, and graduated in 1502. After he had served the duchy of Milan and Pope Julius II in various capacities, the outbreak of the plague caused him to move back to France. He practiced law in Autun in 1506 and became crown attorney of the Autun baillage in 1508. There, he made his reputation as a criminal lawyer by his eloquent defense of a group of rats who were put on trial for destroying the barley crop of the province. His legal career became the basis of the 1993 film The Hour of the Pig.

He became a member of the Dijon parlement in 1525 and president of the Aix parlement in 1532. During the unrest brought about by the Protestant Reformation in France, de Chasseneuz, though a Roman Catholic, sought to protect the Waldensians.

De Chasseneuz's principal work is the Commentaria in consuetudines ducatus Burgundiae (1517), the first substantial and scientific commentary on the droit coutumier or French customary law. The work was widely cited in France and abroad, and was even used centuries later to help interpret the Code Napoléon. This is due to the work's extensive coverage of Roman law, which unlike in other parts of France featured strongly in Burgundian customary law. De Chasseneuz's other works include Catalogus gloriae mundi (1529), an encyclopedic panorama of the author's knowledge, and the Repertorium consiliorum (1531), a collection of legal advice given by him.
