= Antonio Cocchi Donati =

Italian jurist (1450–1491)

Antonio Cocchi Donati, Latinized as Antonius de Cocchis (17 November 1450 – 13 September 1491), was an Italian jurist of the 15th century.

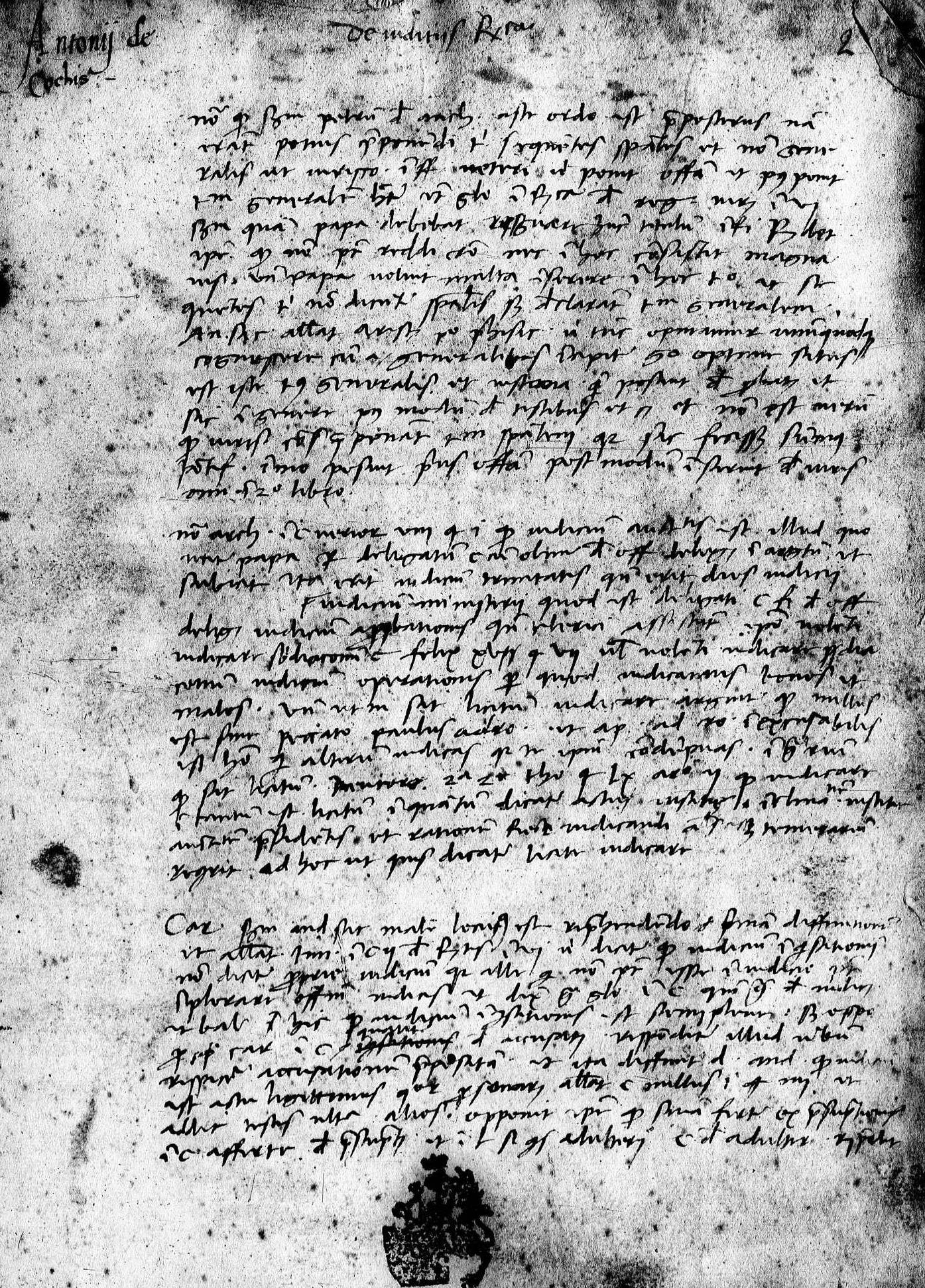
Repetitiones, manuscript, 14th century. Perugia, Biblioteca Comunale Augusta, Fondo manoscritti, ms. E 61.

== Life ==
He was born in Florence in 1450, son of Donato and Costanza Di Piero di Luigi Guicciardini. There is no reliable information about his course of study except for a document of PhD in which that are reported the attended university cities, Siena and Perugia, but he got a degree on 22 October 1473 in Pisa in front of two illustrious Florentine jurists later, Antonio de' Pazzi and Puccio di Antonio de' Pucci. Soon after, he started his career as an extraordinary professor of Canon law of the Catholic Church with a salary of 80 fiorini and as a result he continued a brilliant career that led him to be recognized as one of the leading jurists of the time together with Felino Sandeo, Filippo Decio and Bartolomeo Socini.

In 1475 he became full professor of canon law, while the following year, in response to his subscription to Art of judges and notaries, he started the activity of Vicar of Francesco Salviati. This last one died during the Pazzi conspiracy of 1478 trying to take revenge for the non-assignment of the Florentine Archbishopric, that had been granted to Rinaldo Orsini. With the death of Salviati, the university of Pontifical law of Florence-Pisa, needed to elect a new chancellor, for this reason the canons of the Pisan church elected as vicar and deputy chancellor Cocchi. The short-term assignment was terminated by a Florentine and Pisan canon, Sir Ludovico Martelli, who enjoyed many acclaim in the Capitoline and he aspired to the said office. Cocchi's requests were in vain sent to Lorenzo de' Medici so that he could support his office. This affair hasn't repercussions on the career in the public life of Antonio Cocchi Donati: this in fact testifies to his position as judge "pro tribunali sedens", from 31 March 1476 to 29 April 1478, and a letter "idibus Ianuariis 1478", and a letter that testifies his relationship and his respect with Marsilio Ficino.

After, in 1484, in 1488 and in 1489, he was in competition with the respected Filippo Decio, despite Cocchi enjoyed a reputation among the students and the governing bodies of the Office, among them Angelo Poliziano and the future pope Leo X, Giovanni de' Medici. Poliziano, who had the protection of the Magnifico, from 1480 he held the chair of Latin and Greek eloquence of the Office and he got a degree in canon law presented by Cocchi and Francesco Pepi, while Giovanni de' Medici, second child of Lorenzo, attended classes in 1489–1490.

His prestigious work led him to be supported by many groups of students to serve as a morning reading of canon law after Felino Sendei left the Office, who was nominated in Rome as auditor of the Sacra Rota. He was in competition with Giovanni Cerretani (1486–87) for the same position, then again with Filippo Decio (1488–89) and finally in 1490 with Bono de' Bonis.

His scientific production is little known. Some legal advice is certain in the codes Magliab to the present day. XIX, 188 e 202 of the National Central Library of Florence and in mss. 701 e 704 of the University Library of Pisa (codes Roncioni 22 and 25, inventoried with the no. 691 e 694 in G. Mazzatinti, Inventari..., XXIV) of the repetitiones in the ms. E 61 of the Perugia City Library.

About his family life the information we received concern the brother Niccolò (chamberlain of Arezzo during December 1470 and June 1471, prior during September–October 1477, squeaker in 1480, of the sixteen gonfalonieri of Compagni in 1485 and 1490, of the twelve "buonomini" in 1489 and 1494, vicar of Firenzuola during August–February 1487 and, finally, gonfalonier of Justice in January–February 1492) and Giovanni (who beyond his public and administrative duties took care of studia humanitatis under the leadership of Marsilio Ficino). About his married life, there were two marriages, the first with an unknown Agnoletta and the last one with Filippa, called Pippa, daughter of Adovardo Rucellai.

After a short illness, he died in Florence in 1491.

== Works ==
=== Manuscripts ===
- Repetitiones (in Latin) (Biblioteca Comunale Augusta, Fondo manoscritti, ms. E 61, 14th century ed.). Perugia.
