= Abbey of St Andoche, Autun =

Former Benedictine nunnery

Coordinates: 46.9490°N 4.2952°E

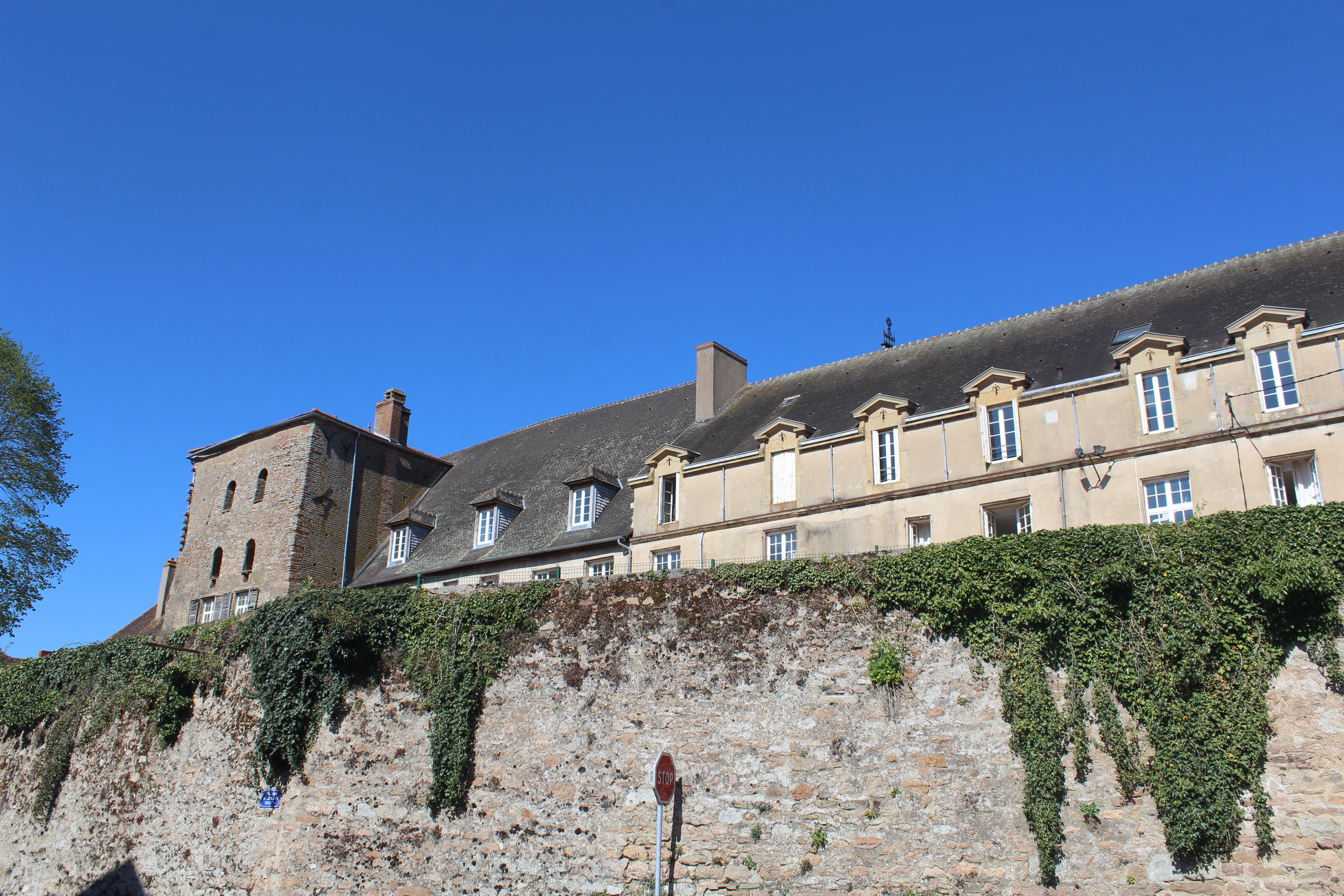
Abbey of St. Andoche

The Abbey of St. Andoche (French: Abbaye Saint-Andoche d'Autun, also Abbaye royale Sainte-Marie et Saint-Andoche d'Autun) in Autun, Saône-et-Loire, France, is a former Benedictine nunnery founded in 592 by Queen Brunhilda on the site of a Roman temple of Diana. The buildings largely survived the French Revolution.
