= Autun =

Subprefecture and commune in Bourgogne-Franche-Comté, France

- Subprefecture and commune
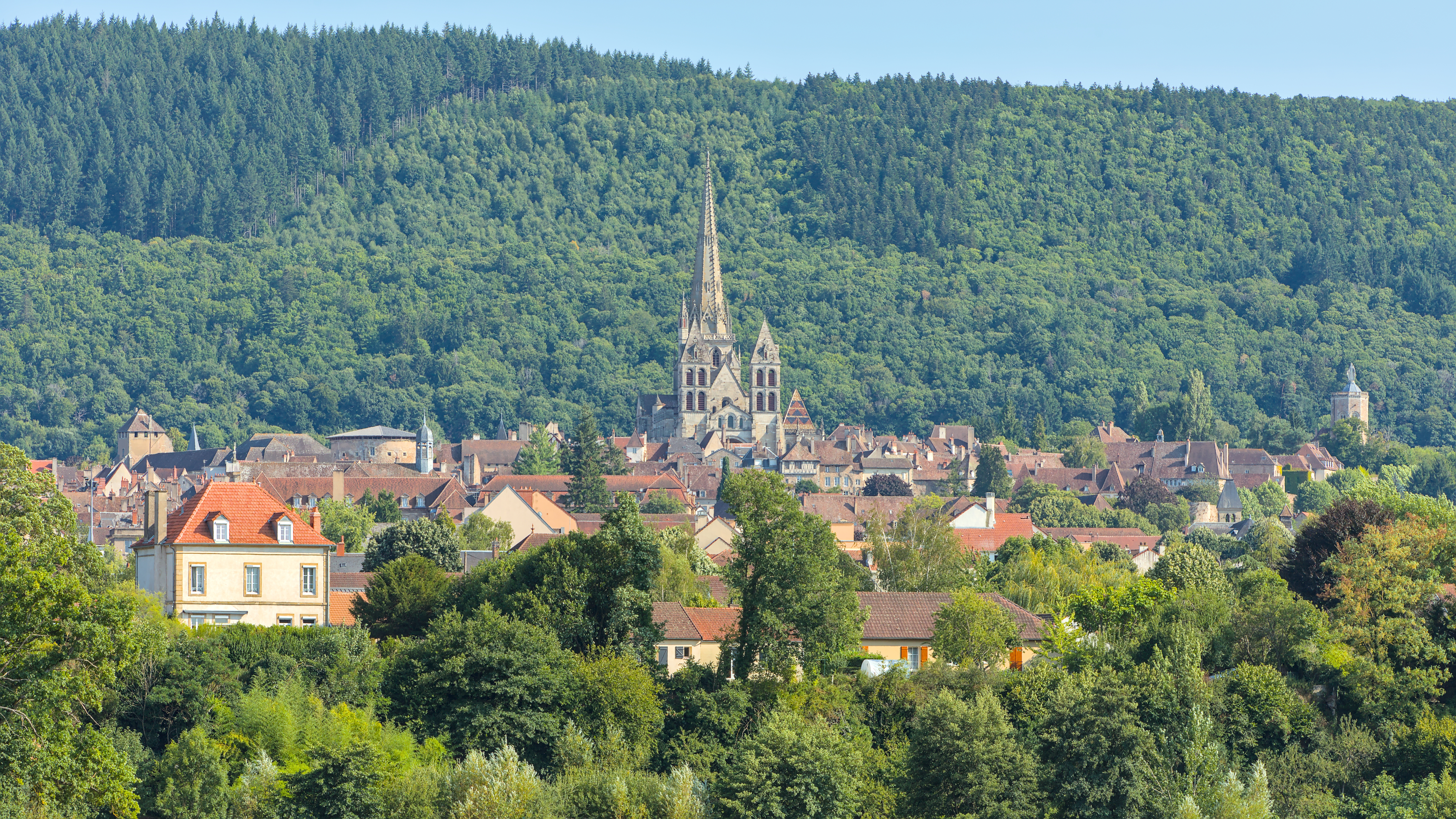
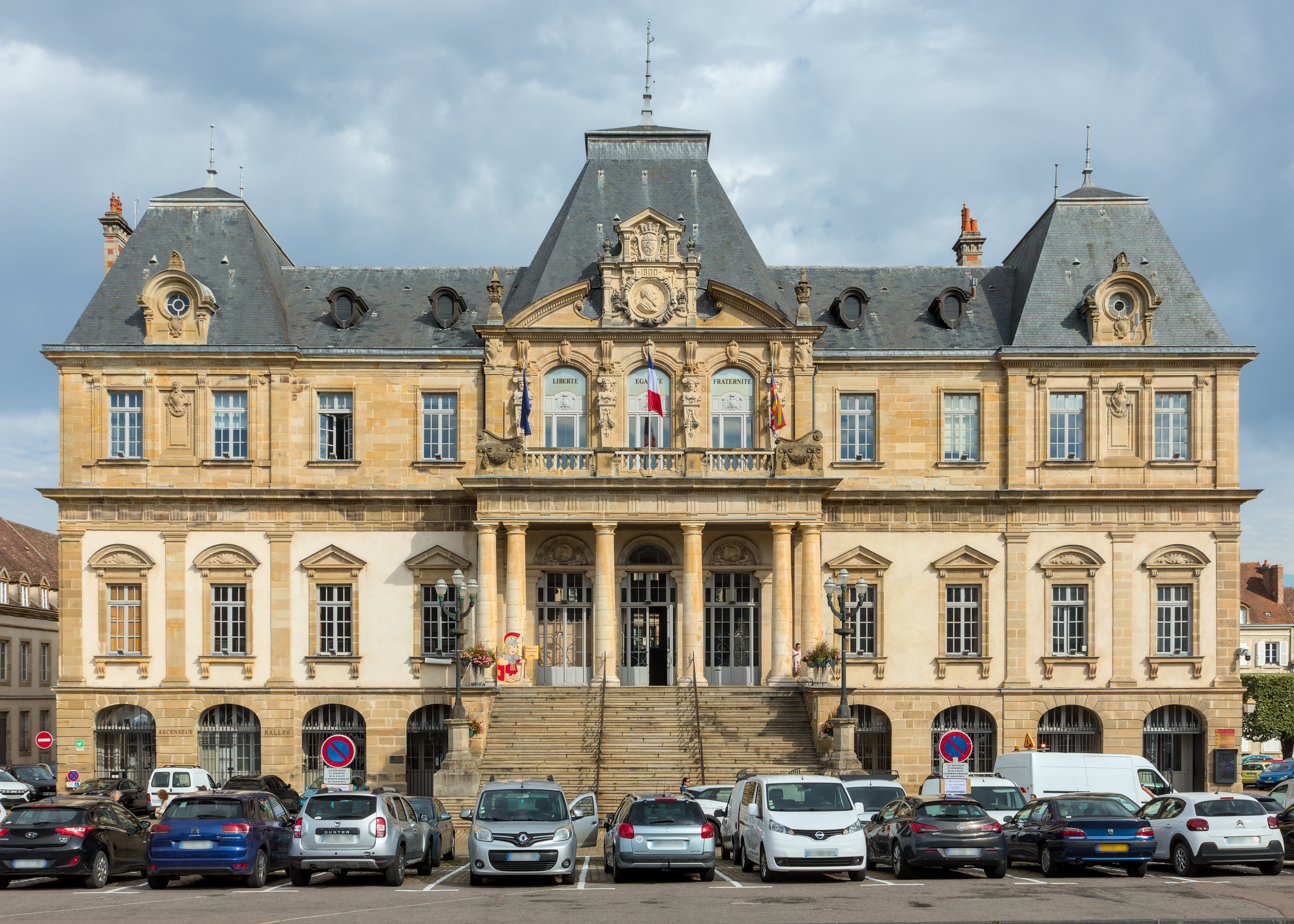
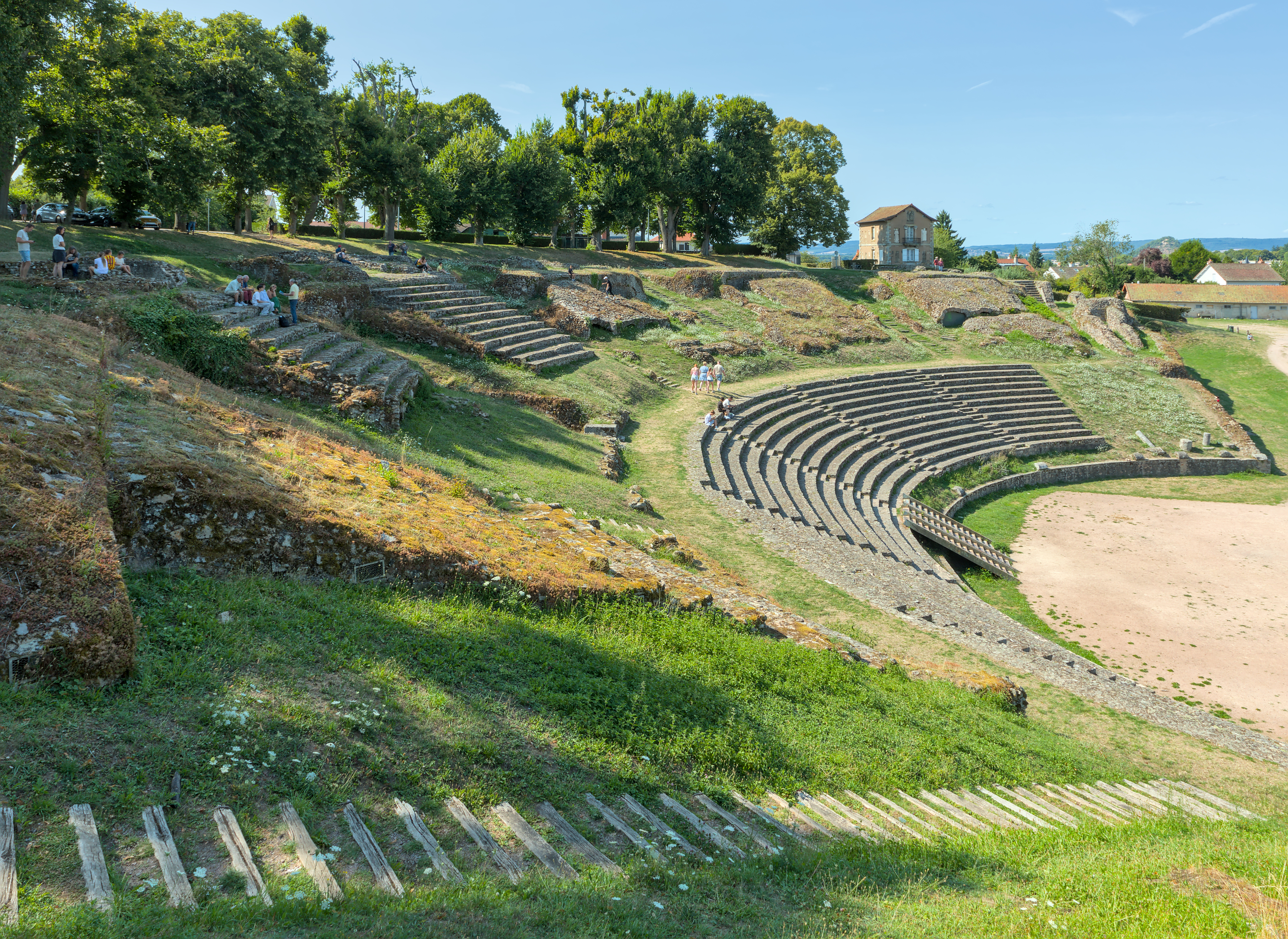
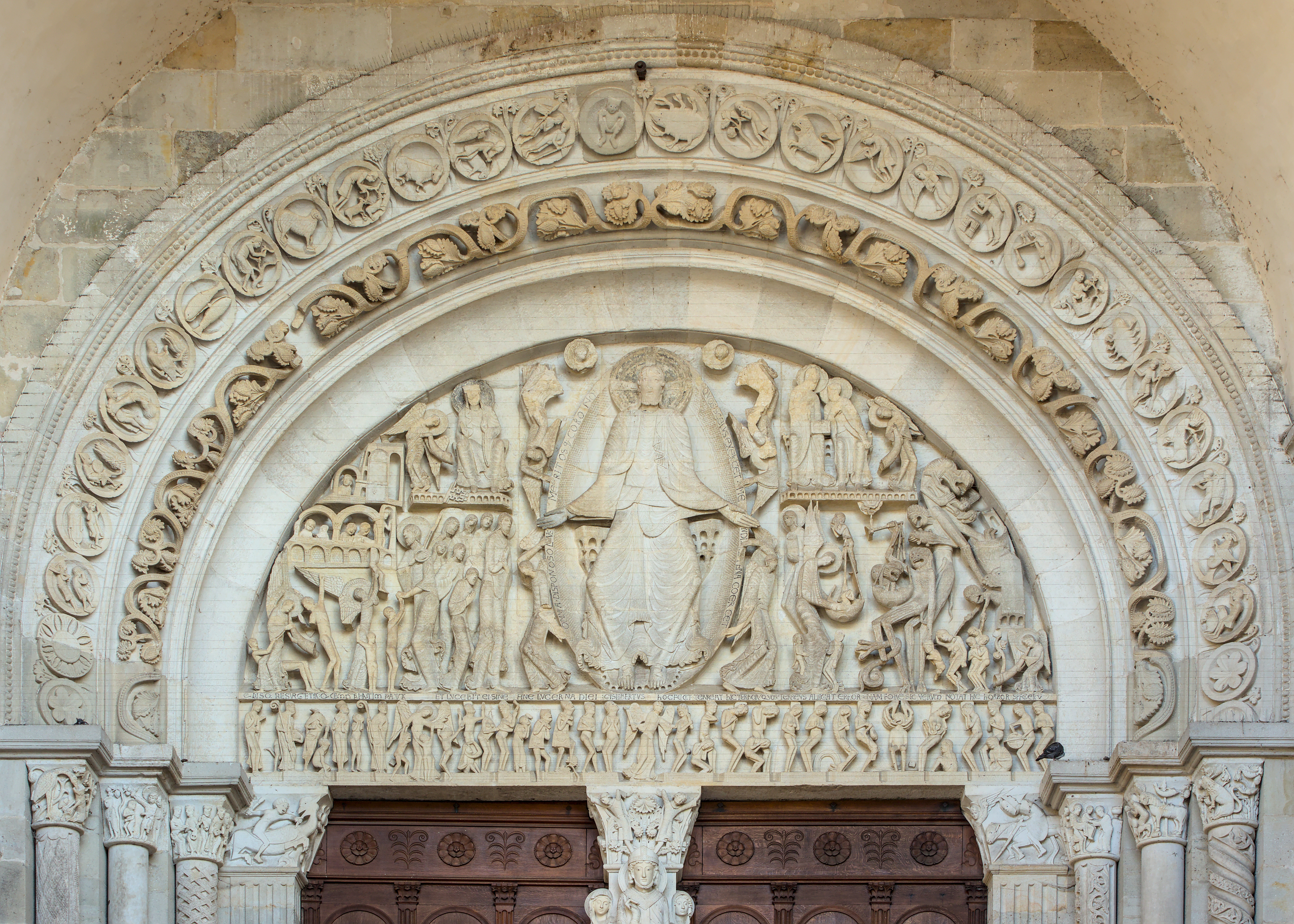
- Clockwise from top: cityscape and Autun Cathedral, Last Judgment tympanum of the cathedral, Roman-era theatre, Autun City Hall

- Coat of arms
- Location of Autun
- Location within France Location within Bourgogne-Franche-Comté
- Coordinates: 46°57′06″N 4°17′58″E
- Country: France
- Region: Bourgogne-Franche-Comté
- Department: Saône-et-Loire
- Arrondissement: Autun
- Canton: Autun-1, Autun-2
- Intercommunality: CC du Grand Autunois Morvan

Government
  - Mayor (2020–2026): Vincent Chauvet (MoDem)
- Area^{1}: 61.52 km^{2} (23.75 sq mi)
- Highest elevation: 642 m (2,106 ft)
- Lowest elevation: 280 m (920 ft)
- Population (2023): 13,172
  - Density: 214.1/km^{2} (554.5/sq mi)
- Demonym: Autunois
- Time zone: UTC+01:00 (CET)
  - Summer (DST): UTC+02:00 (CEST)
- INSEE/Postal code: 71014 /71400
- Website: www.autun.com
- ^{1} French Land Register data, which excludes lakes, ponds, glaciers > 1 km^{2} (0.386 sq mi or 247 acres) and river estuaries.

Autun (French: [otœ̃]) is a subprefecture of the Saône-et-Loire department in the Bourgogne-Franche-Comté region of central-eastern France. It was founded during the Principate era of the early Roman Empire by Emperor Augustus as Augustodunum to give a Roman capital to the Gallic people Aedui, who had Bibracte as their political centre. In Roman times the city may have been home to 30,000 to 100,000 people, according to different estimates. Nowadays, the commune has a population of about 13,000.

A pioneer of the Industrial Revolution in the 19th century with the early exploitation of oil shale and fluorine, in the 20th century, Autun experienced a renewed dynamism which made it a production site for several international companies. It contains one of the six French military high schools (Lycée militaire d'Autun). The city, due to its ancient and medieval past, possesses a rich heritage which makes it one of the most important tourist sites in the heart of Burgundy, just southeast of the Morvan. It is on the Arroux river.

== History ==
=== Early history ===
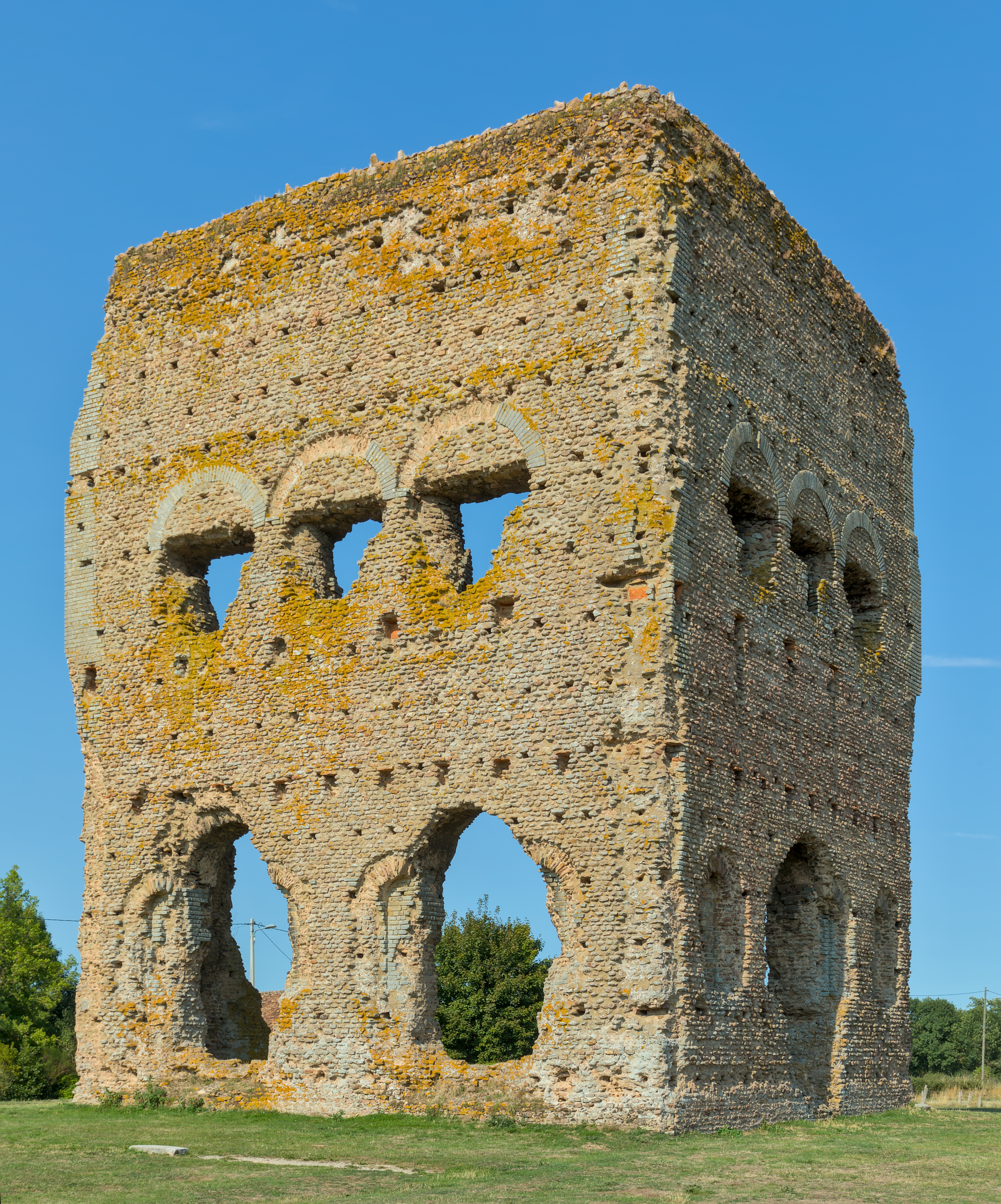
Temple of Janus

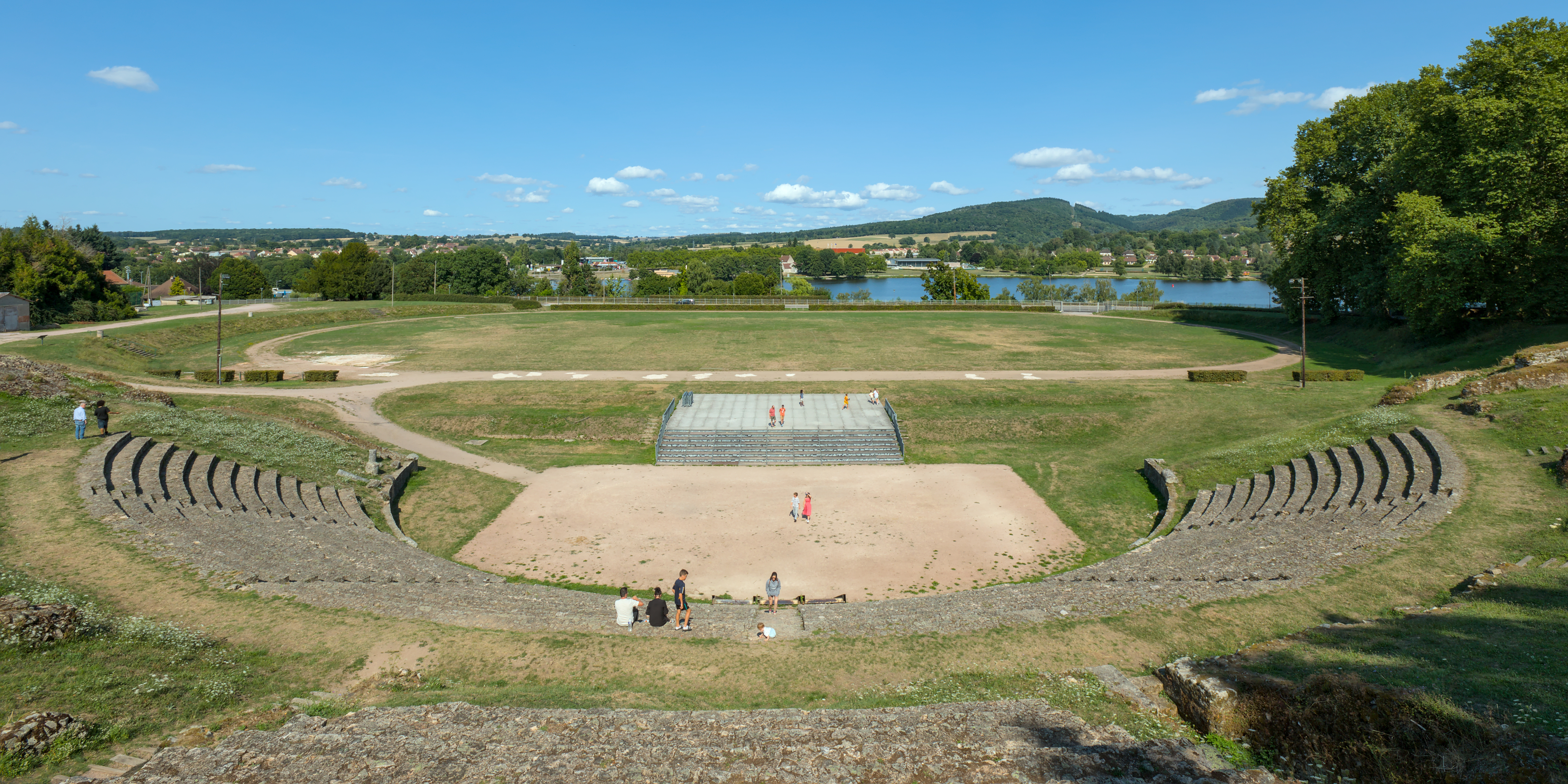
Roman theatre

Augustodunum was founded during the reign of the first Roman emperor, Augustus, after whom it was named. It was the civitas "tribal capital" of the Aedui, Continental Celts who had been allies and "brothers" (fratres) of Rome since before Julius Caesar's Gallic Wars. Augustodunum was a planned foundation replacing the original oppidum Bibracte, located some 25 km (16 mi) away. Several elements of Roman architecture such as walls, gates, and a Roman theatre are still visible in the city.

In AD 356, a force of Alemanni brought the siege of Autun. The disrepair of the walls left the city in danger of falling. Autun was saved by the arrival of the Emperor Julian in one of his early military successes. In Late antiquity, Autun became known for its schools of rhetoric. A world map based on the Geography of Ptolemy, famous for its size, was displayed in the portico of one of the schools. It may have survived until early modern times.

In 532, the Merovingian kings Childebert I and Chlothar I in Battle of Autun defeated the Burgundians led by king Godomar and took over the country of Burgundy. In 642 or 643, another battle was fought near Autun between feuding Frankish noblemen.

Leodegar (Léger; born c. 616 – died 678) was bishop of Autun. He was tortured and killed in Lucheux, Somme on the orders of Ebroin, the Mayor of the Palace. Around 670 he had presided over the second council of Autun (after that of 599, which was convened by Bishop Syagre).

In 880, Count Richard of Autun was made the first Duke of Burgundy.

In 1506, Barthélemy de Chasseneuz made his reputation as an attorney, defending the rats of Autun against the charge of eating the barley crop.

=== Modern times ===
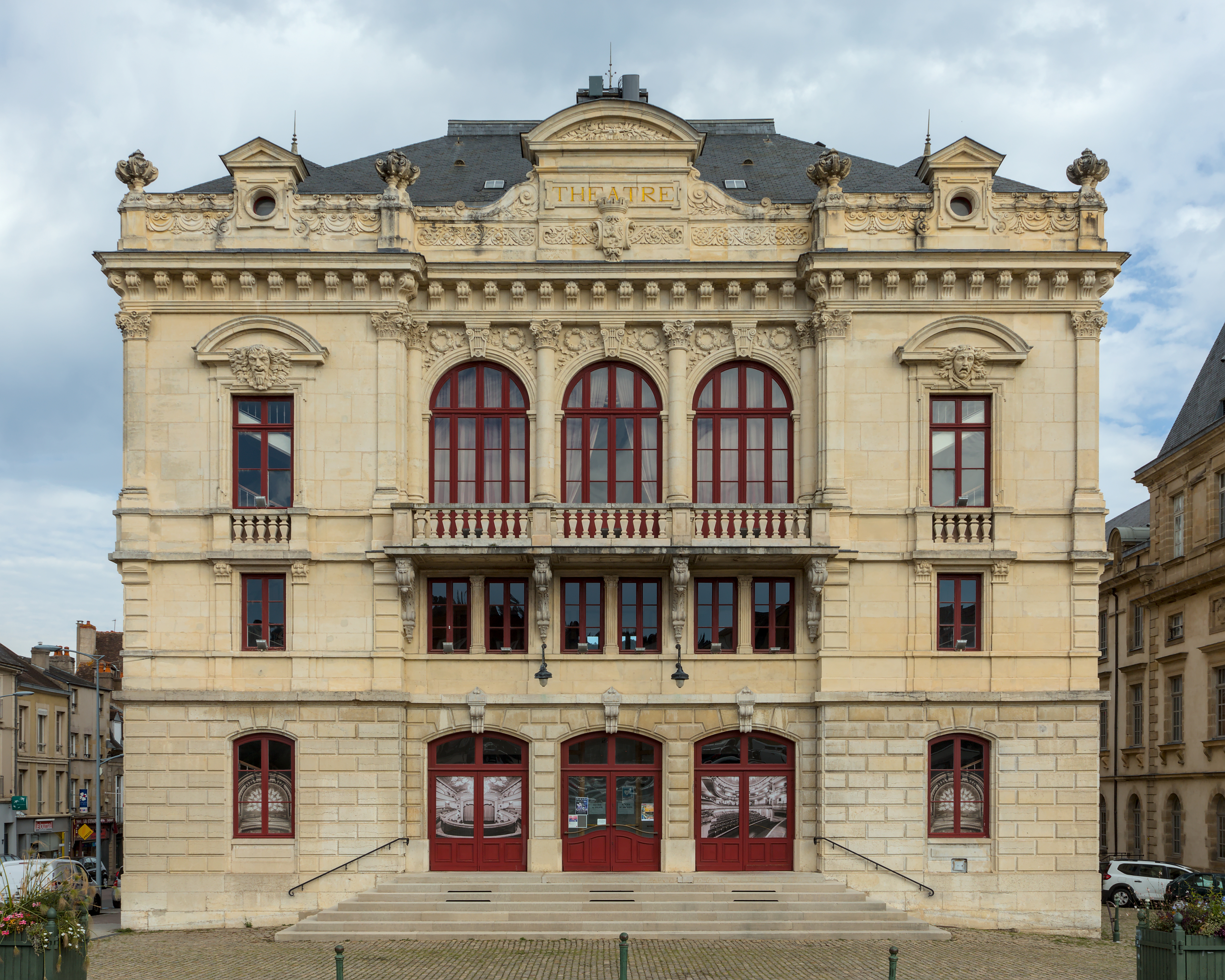
The modern-day theatre

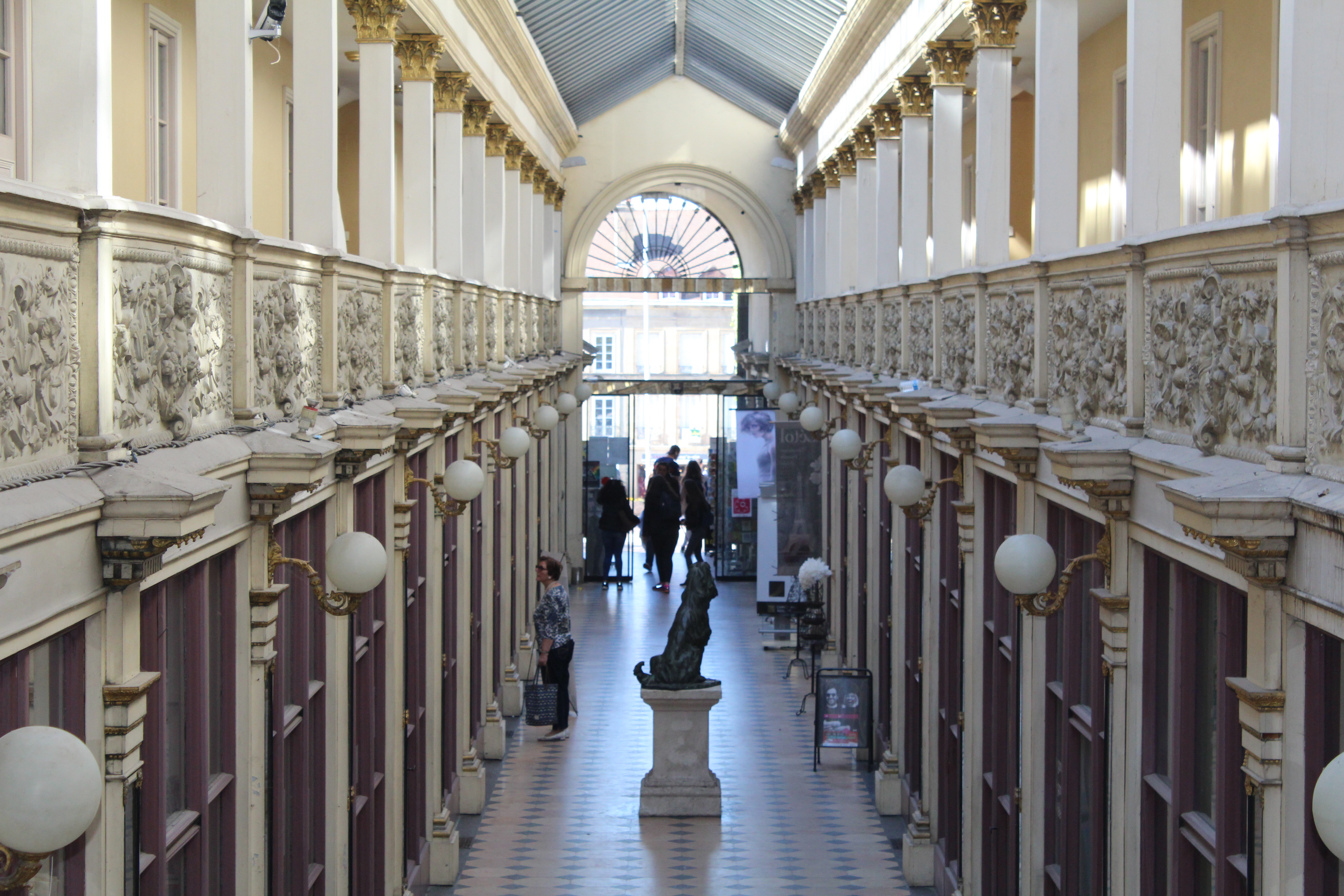
Passage Balthus in the city centre

In 1788, Charles Maurice de Talleyrand-Périgord became bishop of Autun. He was elected member of the clergy for the Estates-General of 1789.

The lycée (high school), Lycée Bonaparte, has played an important role in the history of the city since Napoleon gave it its current name, and his brothers Joseph and Lucien studied there. This school continues to operate today. The decorated wrought iron gates were erected in 1772; the subjects taught in the school are indicated by various representations of objects along the top of these grids.

In 1837, a commercial mining of oil shale deposit near Autun marked the beginning of the modern oil-shale industry. In 1852, the uranium mineral autunite was first discovered near Autun, and named for the town.

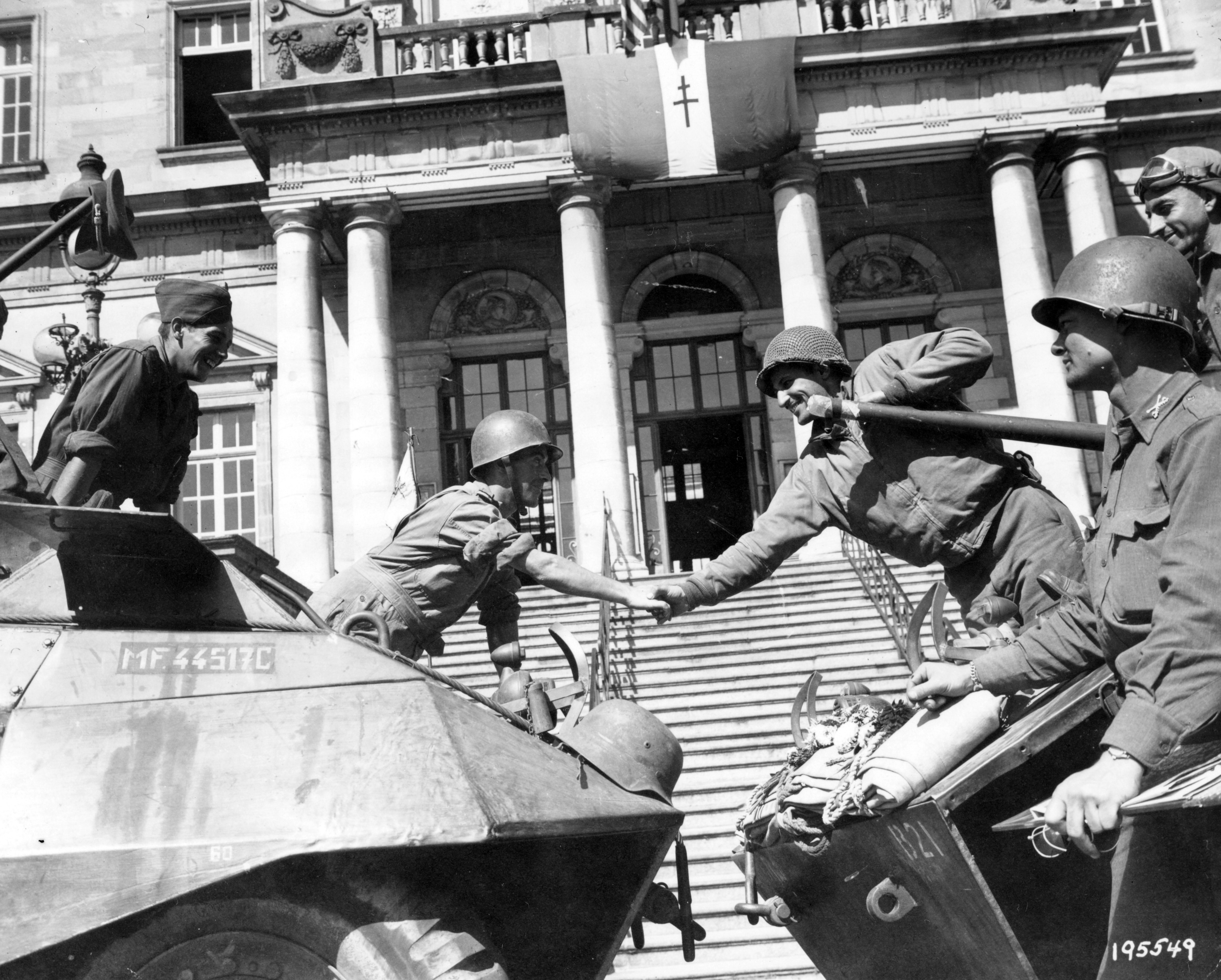
French and American servicemen in front of Autun City Hall on 13 September 1944, three days after the city was liberated from German occupation. Adjutant Émile Lancery (left), of the French troops of General Patch's 7th Army, who came from Toulon, shakes hands with Louis Basil, a sergeant in Patton's 3rd Army, who arrived from the Cotentin. A French flag with a Cross of Lorraine is visible in the background.

During the Franco-Prussian War of 1870, the leader of the Army of the Vosges, Giuseppe Garibaldi, chose the city as his headquarters. The fight to liberate Autun from the German occupation at the end of World War II, on 8–9 September 1944, was particularly bloody for the French Resistance, with about 80 of its members killed. In the months prior, the Germans had destroyed a number of villages in the area, particularly in the Morvan, home to a large Resistance movement. The Germans surrendered unconditionally on 10 September 1944, before the Americans reached Autun on 13 September.

== Geography ==
The city rests on the southern edge of a depression called the Permian Autun Basin which includes the Autunian stratotype forming the Autunois. It is surrounded to the north by bocage meadows (bocage with wide mesh), to the west by the Morvan massif, and to the south by deciduous forests (domanial forest of Planoise) covering a sandstone plateau.

The Autunois region is composed of sixty-four communes grouped into seven cantons. In the cantons of Autun-Nord and Autun-Sud are the following municipalities: Antully, Auxy, Curgy, Dracy-Saint-Loup, Monthelon, Saint-Forgeot and Tavernay.

=== Climate ===
The commune lies in the northwest of the department.

For the period 1971–2000, the average annual temperature was 10.5 °C, with an annual temperature range of 16.6 °C. The average annual cumulative precipitation was 1,061 mm, with 12.1 days of precipitation in January and 7.6 days in July. For the period 1991–2020, the average annual temperature observed at the meteorological station installed in the municipality was 10.7 °C and the average annual cumulative precipitation was 857.2 mm. The maximum temperature recorded at this station was 40 °C, reached on 12 August 2003; the minimum temperature was −18.3 °C, reached on 20 December 2009.

Climate data for Autun (1991–2020 averages)
| Month | Jan | Feb | Mar | Apr | May | Jun | Jul | Aug | Sep | Oct | Nov | Dec | Year |
|---|---|---|---|---|---|---|---|---|---|---|---|---|---|
| Record high °C (°F) | 16.9 (62.4) | 20.3 (68.5) | 25.3 (77.5) | 28.2 (82.8) | 32.2 (90.0) | 36.9 (98.4) | 39.2 (102.6) | 40.0 (104.0) | 34.5 (94.1) | 28.9 (84.0) | 22.2 (72.0) | 16.8 (62.2) | 40.0 (104.0) |
| Mean daily maximum °C (°F) | 6.1 (43.0) | 7.8 (46.0) | 12.3 (54.1) | 15.8 (60.4) | 19.7 (67.5) | 23.5 (74.3) | 25.9 (78.6) | 25.8 (78.4) | 21.3 (70.3) | 16.3 (61.3) | 10.2 (50.4) | 6.6 (43.9) | 15.9 (60.6) |
| Daily mean °C (°F) | 2.9 (37.2) | 3.7 (38.7) | 6.9 (44.4) | 9.7 (49.5) | 13.6 (56.5) | 17.2 (63.0) | 19.2 (66.6) | 19.0 (66.2) | 15.0 (59.0) | 11.3 (52.3) | 6.4 (43.5) | 3.5 (38.3) | 10.7 (51.3) |
| Mean daily minimum °C (°F) | −0.3 (31.5) | −0.5 (31.1) | 1.4 (34.5) | 3.5 (38.3) | 7.5 (45.5) | 10.9 (51.6) | 12.6 (54.7) | 12.2 (54.0) | 8.6 (47.5) | 6.3 (43.3) | 2.7 (36.9) | 0.3 (32.5) | 5.4 (41.7) |
| Record low °C (°F) | −14.3 (6.3) | −15.9 (3.4) | −13.2 (8.2) | −6.5 (20.3) | −2.0 (28.4) | 0.5 (32.9) | 4.5 (40.1) | 1.7 (35.1) | −1.2 (29.8) | −7.9 (17.8) | −12.0 (10.4) | −18.3 (−0.9) | −18.3 (−0.9) |
| Average precipitation mm (inches) | 80.7 (3.18) | 60.9 (2.40) | 60.1 (2.37) | 64.3 (2.53) | 74.9 (2.95) | 65.8 (2.59) | 60.3 (2.37) | 61.3 (2.41) | 63.1 (2.48) | 79.8 (3.14) | 91.3 (3.59) | 94.7 (3.73) | 857.2 (33.75) |
| Average precipitation days (≥ 1.0 mm) | 10.6 | 9.0 | 9.2 | 10.0 | 10.6 | 8.5 | 8.3 | 8.0 | 8.0 | 10.5 | 11.7 | 12.6 | 117.0 |
| Mean monthly sunshine hours | 67.3 | 102.5 | 161.7 | 196.6 | 209.1 | 245.4 | 261.9 | 228.0 | 191.8 | 124.1 | 71.6 | 58.5 | 1,918.4 |
Source: Meteociel

== Population ==
Historical population

| Year | Pop. | ±% p.a. |
|---|---|---|
| 1793 | 7,792 | — |
| 1800 | 9,176 | +2.36% |
| 1806 | 9,400 | +0.40% |
| 1821 | 9,744 | +0.24% |
| 1831 | 9,936 | +0.20% |
| 1836 | 10,435 | +0.98% |
| 1841 | 11,164 | +1.36% |
| 1846 | 11,637 | +0.83% |
| 1851 | 11,997 | +0.61% |
| 1856 | 11,156 | −1.44% |
| 1861 | 11,897 | +1.29% |
| 1866 | 12,389 | +0.81% |
| 1872 | 11,684 | −0.97% |
| 1876 | 12,889 | +2.48% |
| 1881 | 14,049 | +1.74% |
| 1886 | 14,895 | +1.18% |
| 1891 | 15,187 | +0.39% |
| 1896 | 15,543 | +0.46% |
| 1901 | 15,764 | +0.28% |

| Year | Pop. | ±% p.a. |
|---|---|---|
| 1906 | 15,479 | −0.36% |
| 1911 | 15,498 | +0.02% |
| 1921 | 13,856 | −1.11% |
| 1926 | 14,119 | +0.38% |
| 1931 | 14,045 | −0.11% |
| 1936 | 14,863 | +1.14% |
| 1946 | 14,438 | −0.29% |
| 1954 | 14,399 | −0.03% |
| 1962 | 15,305 | +0.77% |
| 1968 | 18,398 | +3.12% |
| 1975 | 21,556 | +2.29% |
| 1982 | 20,587 | −0.65% |
| 1990 | 17,906 | −1.73% |
| 1999 | 16,419 | −0.96% |
| 2007 | 15,069 | −1.07% |
| 2012 | 14,124 | −1.29% |
| 2017 | 13,290 | −1.21% |
| 2023 | 13,172 | −0.15% |

Source: EHESS and INSEE (1968–2023)

== Sights ==
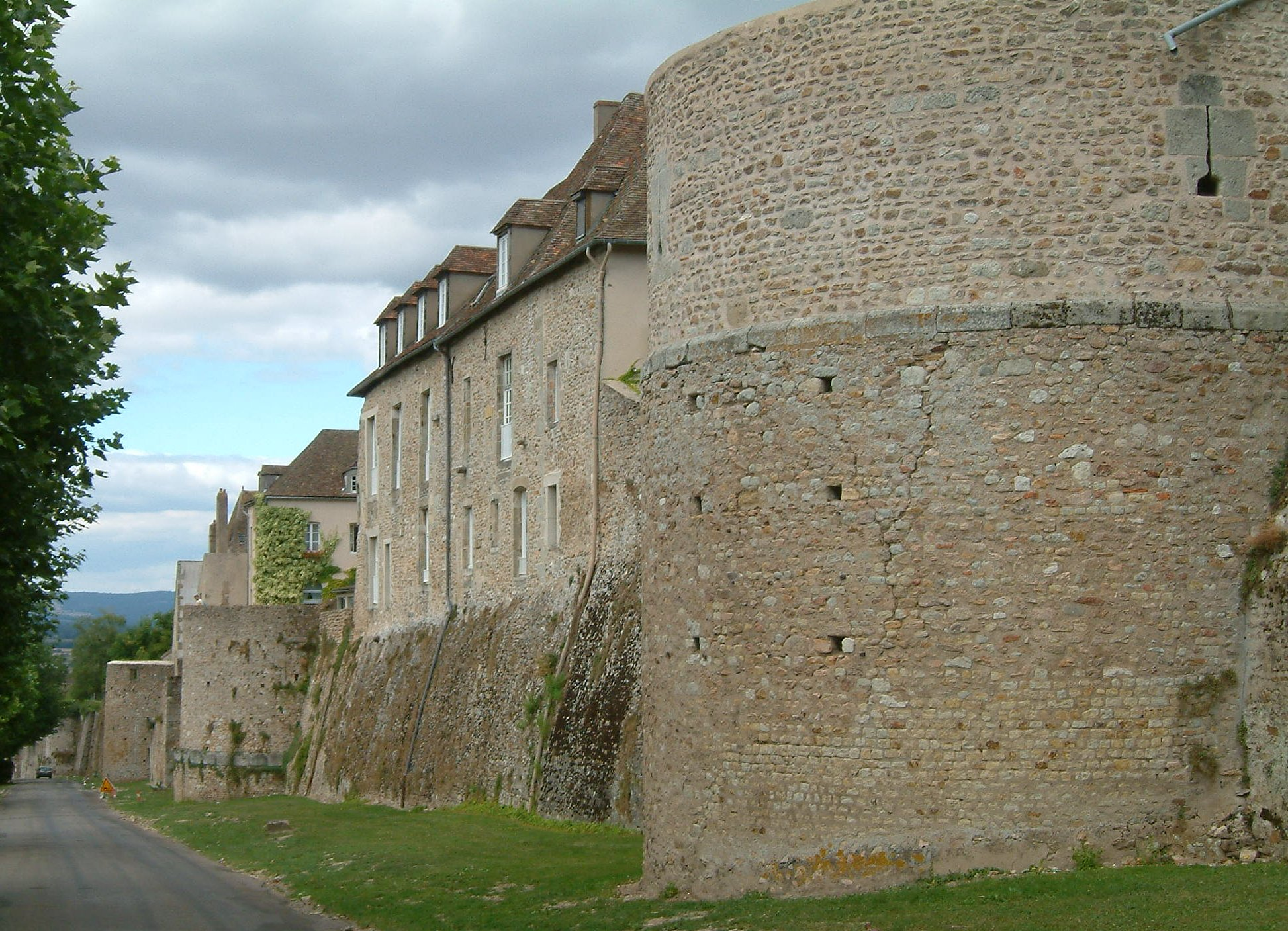
Autun remparts (defensive walls from the Roman era)

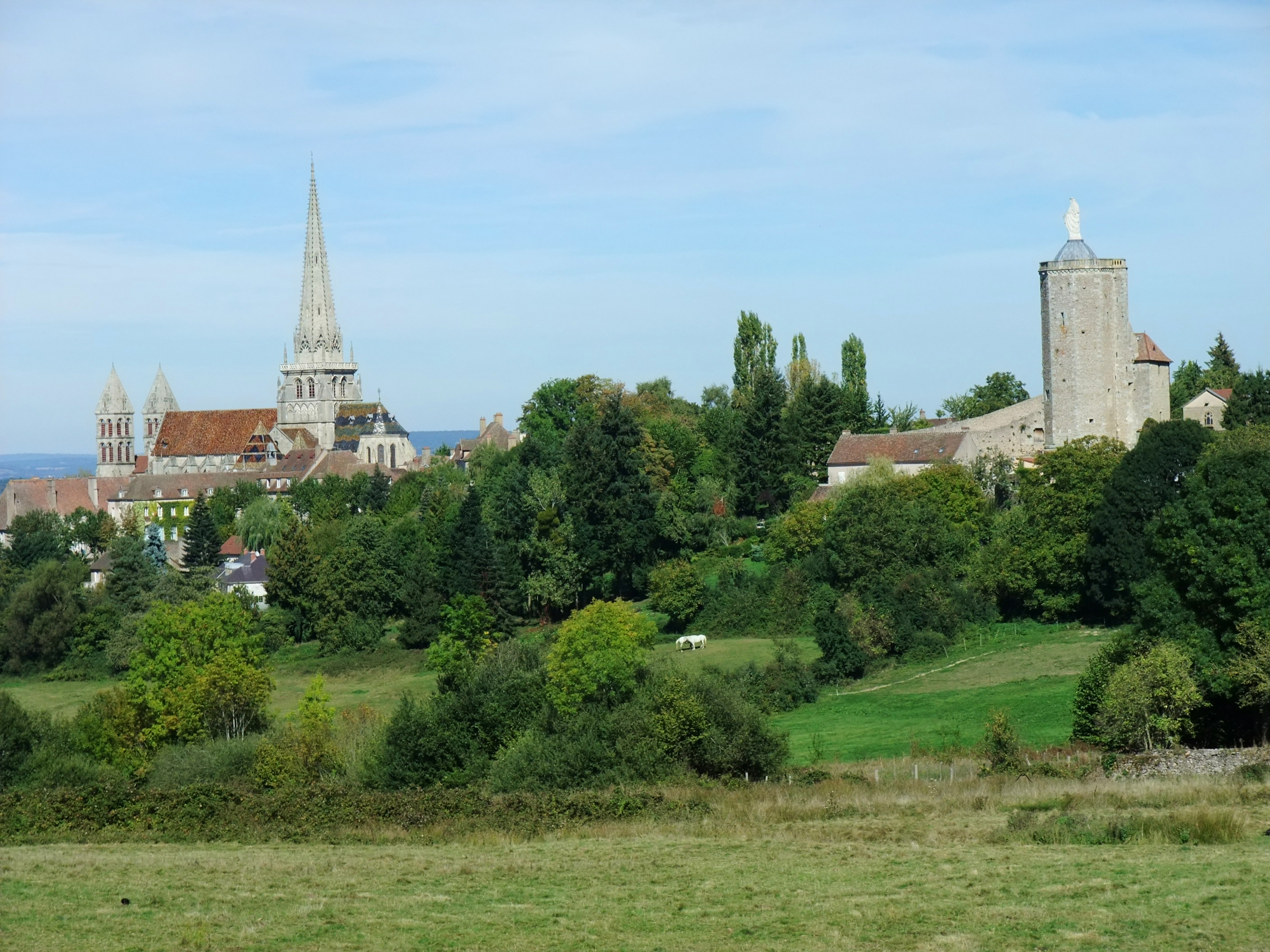
Tour des Ursulines near Autun Cathedral

The city boasts two ancient Roman gates (Porte Saint-André and Porte d'Arroux) and other ruins dating to the time of Augustus. One of the most impressive remains is that of the ancient theatre, which was one of the largest in the western part of the empire with a 17,000-seat capacity. To the northwest of the city is the so-called Temple of Janus, only two walls (faces) of which remain. To the southeast is the mysterious Pierre de Couhard, a rock pyramid of uncertain function which may date to Roman times.

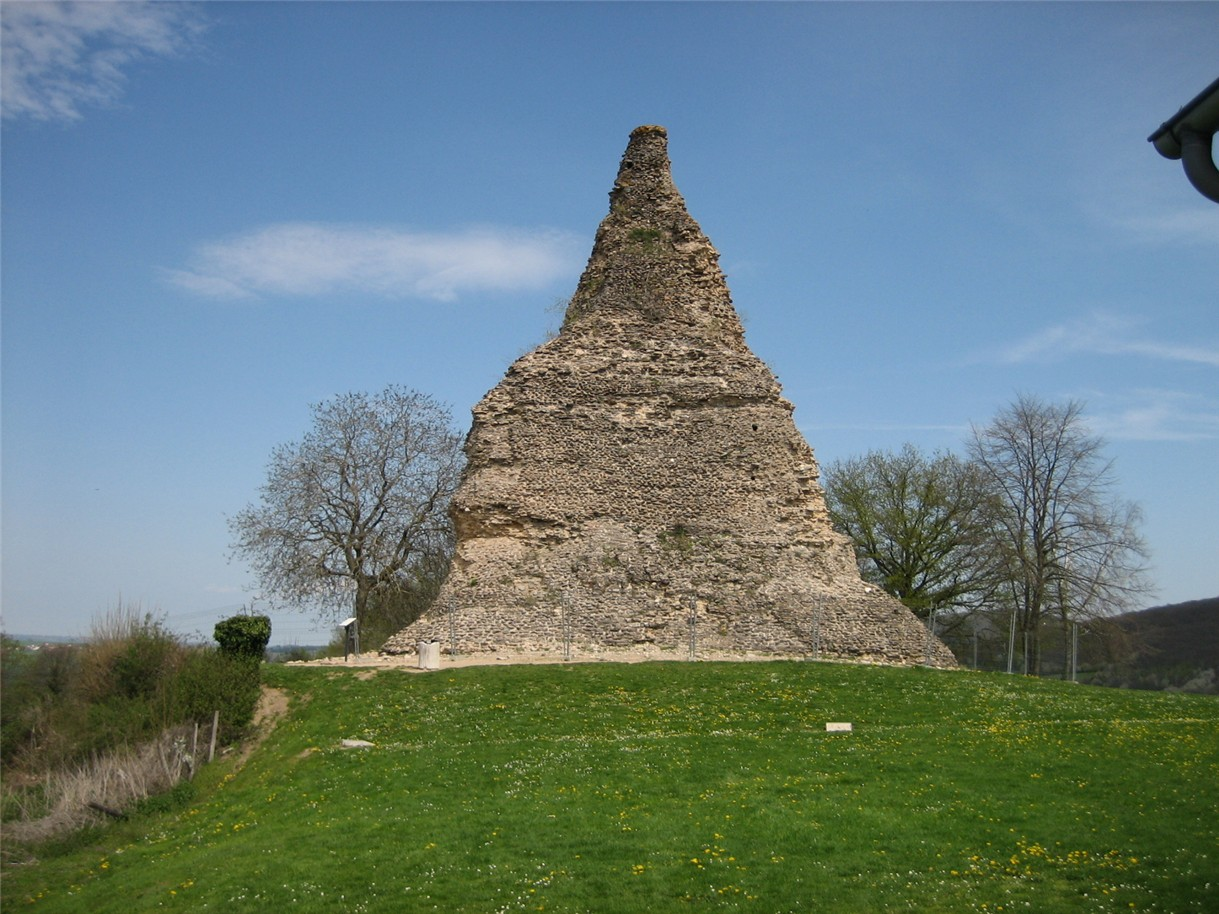
Couhard Pyramid

Autun Cathedral, also known as Saint Lazare Cathedral, dates from the early twelfth century and is a major example of Romanesque architecture. It was formerly the chapel of the Dukes of Burgundy; their palace was the actual episcopal residence. The cathedral was originally built as a pilgrimage church for the veneration of the relic Saint Lazarus, mentioned in the Gospels, and considered the first bishop of Marseille, and who, always according to tradition, arrived in Provence with Mary Magdalen.

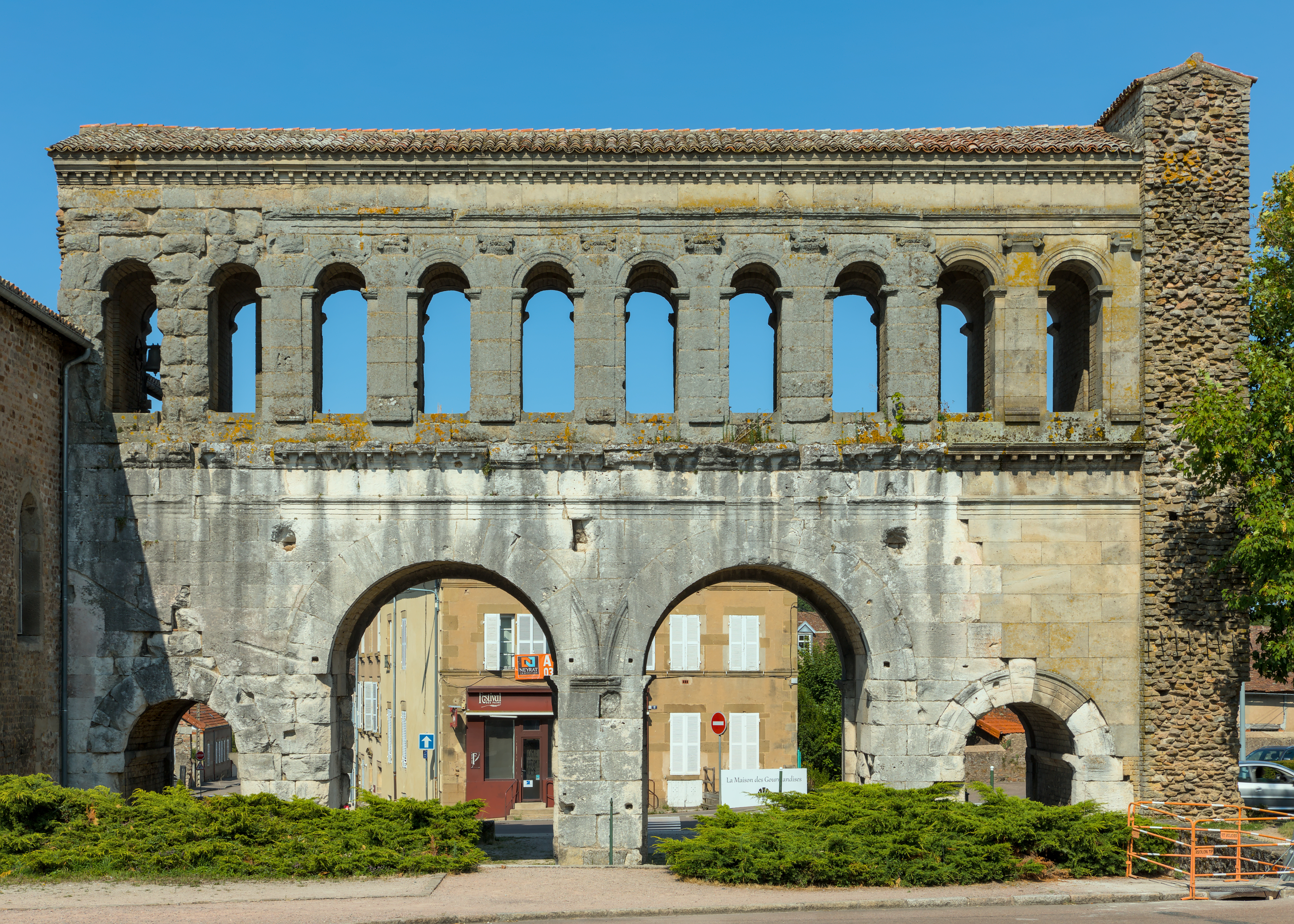
Saint-André Gate

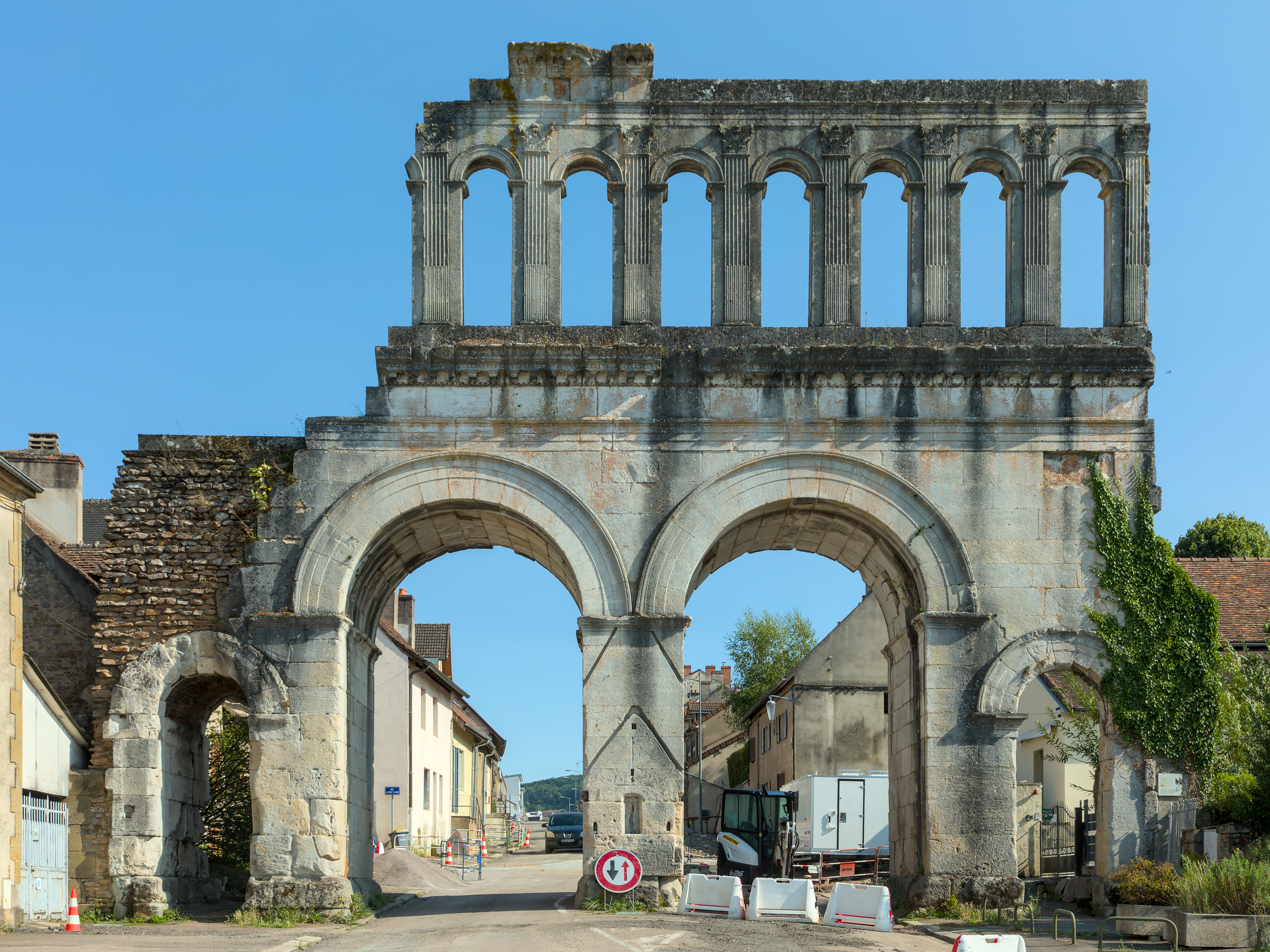
Arroux Gate

Autun's 12th-century bishop, Étienne de Bâgé, probably built the church in response to the construction of Ste. Madeleine at nearby Vézelay, home to the French cult of Mary Magdalene. St Lazare was only later elevated to the rank of cathedral, replacing the former cathedral dedicated to St Nazaire.

The Autun Cathedral is famous for its architectural sculpture, particularly the tympanum of The Last Judgment above the west portal, surviving fragments from the lost portal of the north transept, and the capitals in the nave and choir. All of these are traditionally considered the work of Gislebertus, whose name is on the west tympanum. It is uncertain whether Gislebertus is the name of the sculptor or of a patron. If Gislebertus is in fact the artist, he is one of very few medieval artists whose name is known.

== Other notable connections ==
- Saint Regina of Autun, a 3rd Century Virgin Martyr who was born in Autun and whose feast day is the 7th of September.
- Bishop and Saint Leodegar (c. 615 – 679)
- Nivelon I (d. 768) was known as Count of Autun
- In the late 9th century, Charles Martel's daughter (name listed as Auda, Alane, or Aldana) married Thierry IV (also called Theoderich or Theoderic), Count of Autun.
- In the late 9th century, the countship was vacant after the death of Robert the Strong, but was returned to Bernard Plantapilosa, son of Bernard of Septimania, and then later to Bernard of Gothia after Bernard fell out of favour.
- In 878, King Louis the Younger took the countship away and gave it to his chamberlain, Theodoric.
- Honorius Augustodunensis (died c. 1151)
- Barthélemy de Chasseneuz practiced law in Autun in 1506, became crown attorney of the Autun bailliage in 1508, where he made his reputation as a criminal lawyer by his eloquent defence of a group of rats who were put on trial for destroying the barley crop of the province.
- Nicolas Rolin, Chancellor of Burgundy under Philip the Good, came from Autun, where several examples of his artistic patronage can be seen. The Rolin Madonna, by Jan van Eyck, in the Louvre, shows what was probably at least intended as a view of Autun in the background.
- Autun is the main setting for James Salter's 1967 novel A Sport and a Pastime.

== Sport ==
- The European Triathlon Championships were also held in the town in 2006.
- The Fifth Stage of the 2007 Tour de France ended in the town, with the entrance to Autun being a twisting and winding route down from a nearby mountain.

== Tourism ==
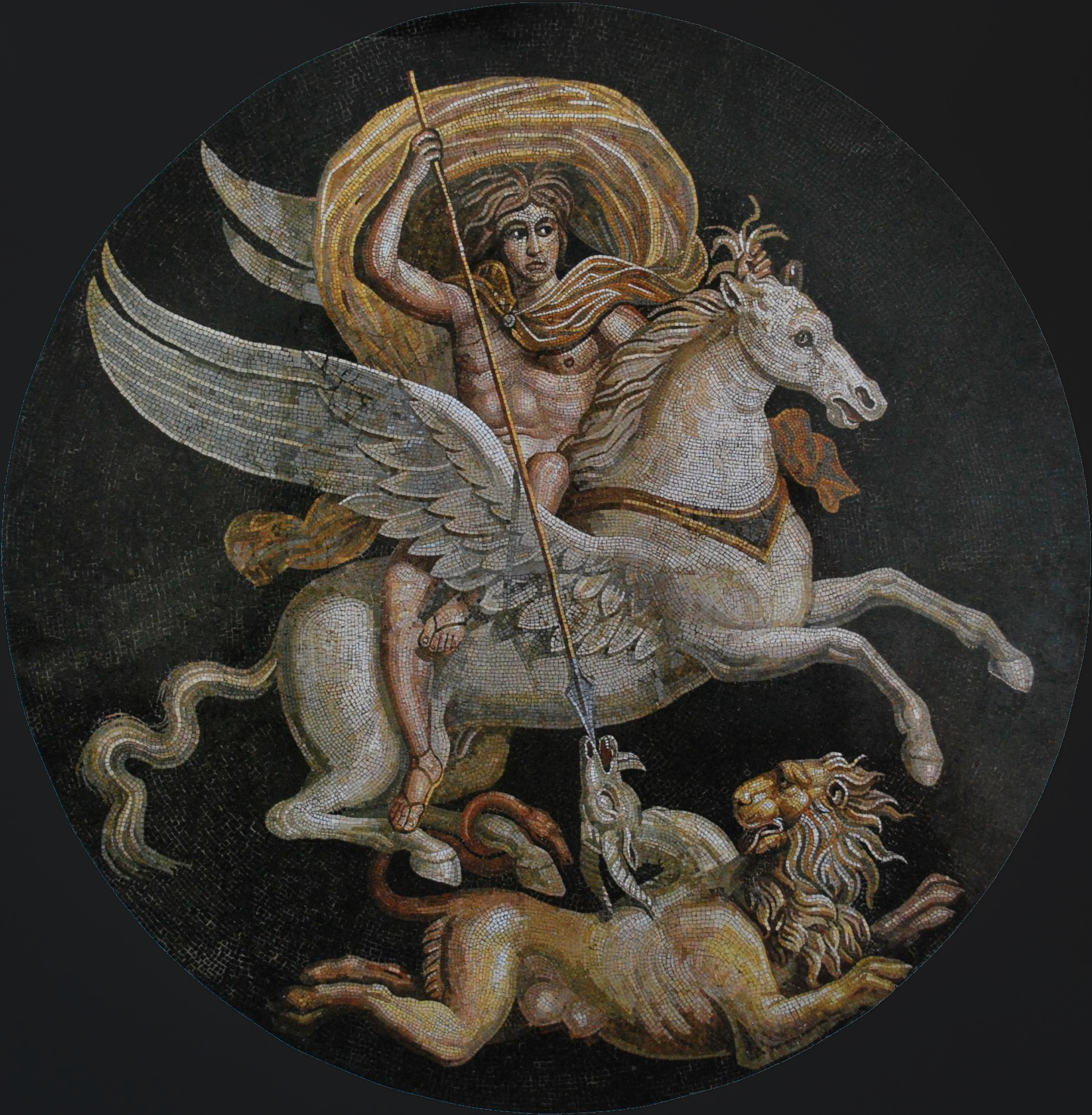
Bellerophon riding Pegasus and slaying the Chimera, central medallion of a Roman mosaic from Autun, Musée Rolin, 2nd to 3rd century AD

Autun's best-known museum is the Musée Rolin. It houses historical artistic collections.

Near Autun, tourists can also see:

- The Arboretum de Pézanin, one of the richest forest collection in France
- The Rock of Solutré
- Cluny Abbey and its medieval city
- Charolles and the "bœuf charolais"
- Mâcon, Paray-le-Monial

== Sister cities ==
Autun has sister city relationships with the following municipalities.

| City | Country | Year |
|---|---|---|
| Ingelheim am Rhein | Germany | 1963 |
| Stevenage | United Kingdom | 1975 |
| Kawagoe | Japan | 2002 |
| Arévalo | Spain | 2005 |

== See also ==
- Abbey of St Andoche, Autun
- Abbey of Saint-Jean-le-Grand
- Communes of the Saône-et-Loire department
- Morvan Regional Natural Park
- Musée Rolin
- Les Télots Mine
- Roman Catholic Diocese of Autun
- Épinac coal mine
