= Alexander de Tartagnis =

Italian jurist

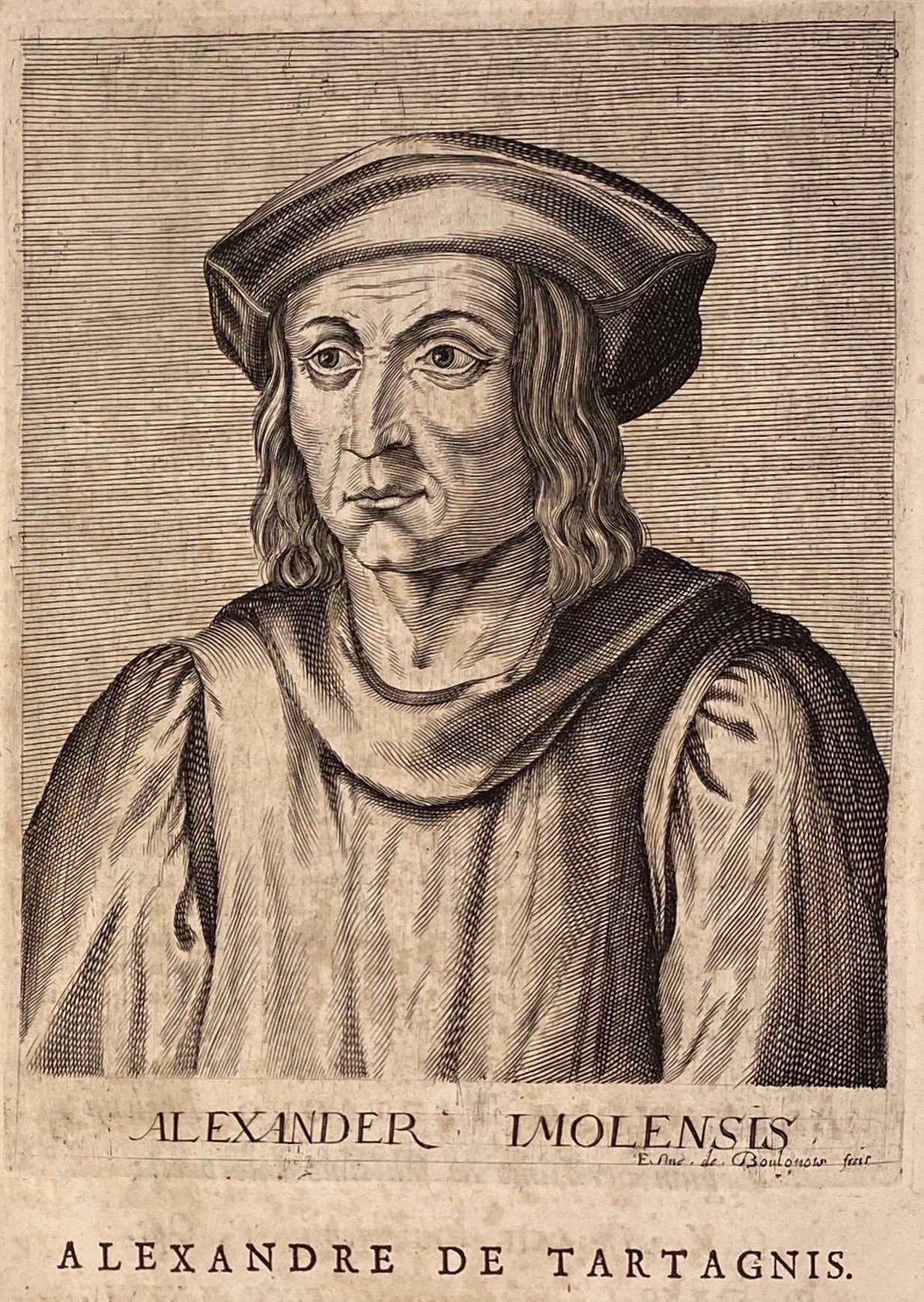
Alexander de Tartagnis

Alexander de Tartagnis (c. 1424 – 1477) was an Italian jurist.

After completing his studies in Bologna, he became an assessor at the Conservatore della Giustizia and taught law in Bologna, Ferrara and Padua.

His work includes commentaries on select parts of the Pandects and on other works, as well as more than 1200 advisory opinions. He reports that, for humanitarian reasons, he did not issue advisory opinions in the disfavour of the accused in criminal cases.

Paulus Castrensis was one of his teachers. Jason de Mayno, Bartholomaeus Socinus, and Ludovico Bolognini were three of his students.

== Works ==
- Interpraetationes ad frequentiores Pandectarum titulos, leges et paragraphos (in Latin). Vol. 5. Venezia: Bartolomeo Arese. 1595.
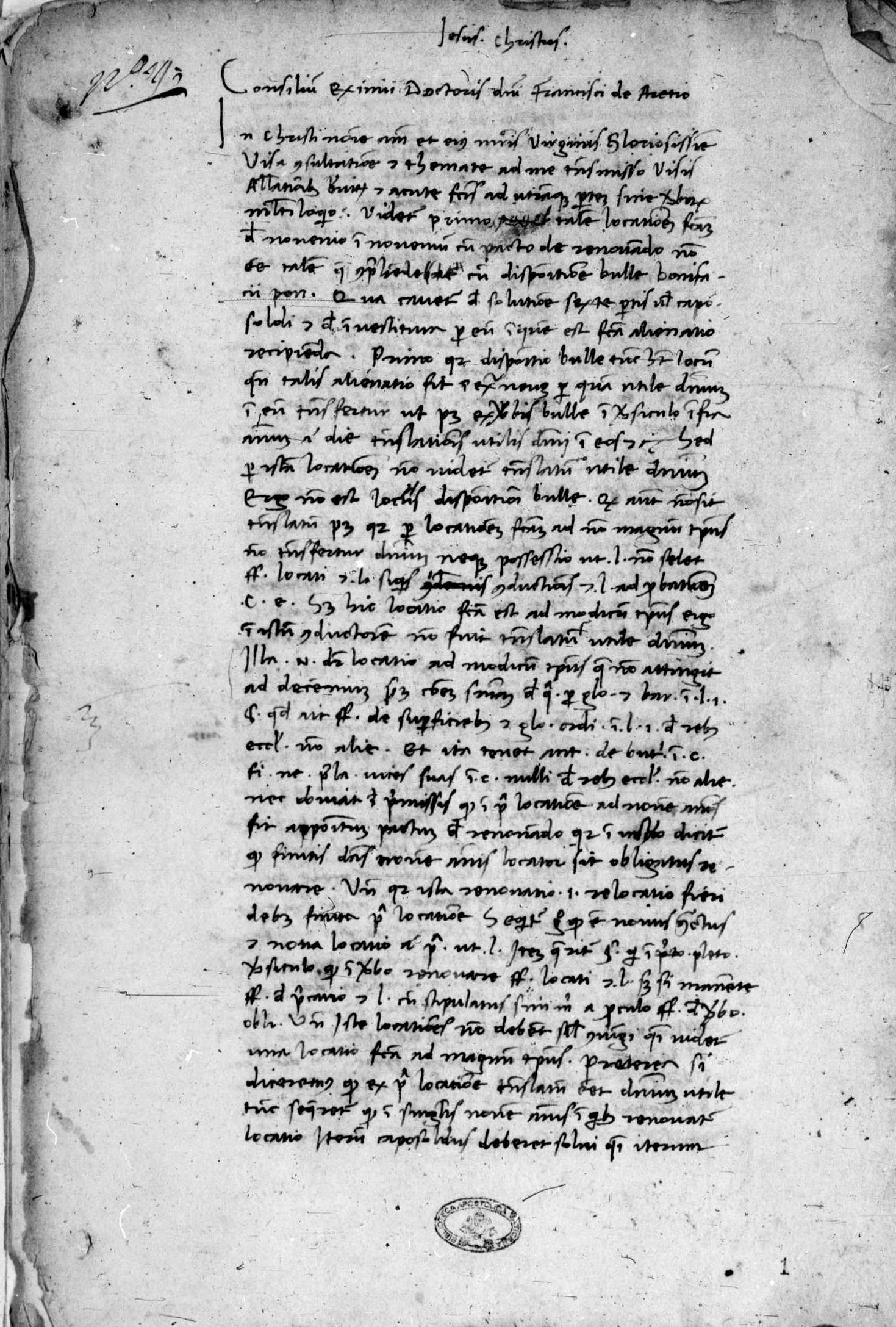
Consilia, 15th-century manuscript, Vatican City, Biblioteca Apostolica Vaticana, Fondo Patetta, Patetta 205.

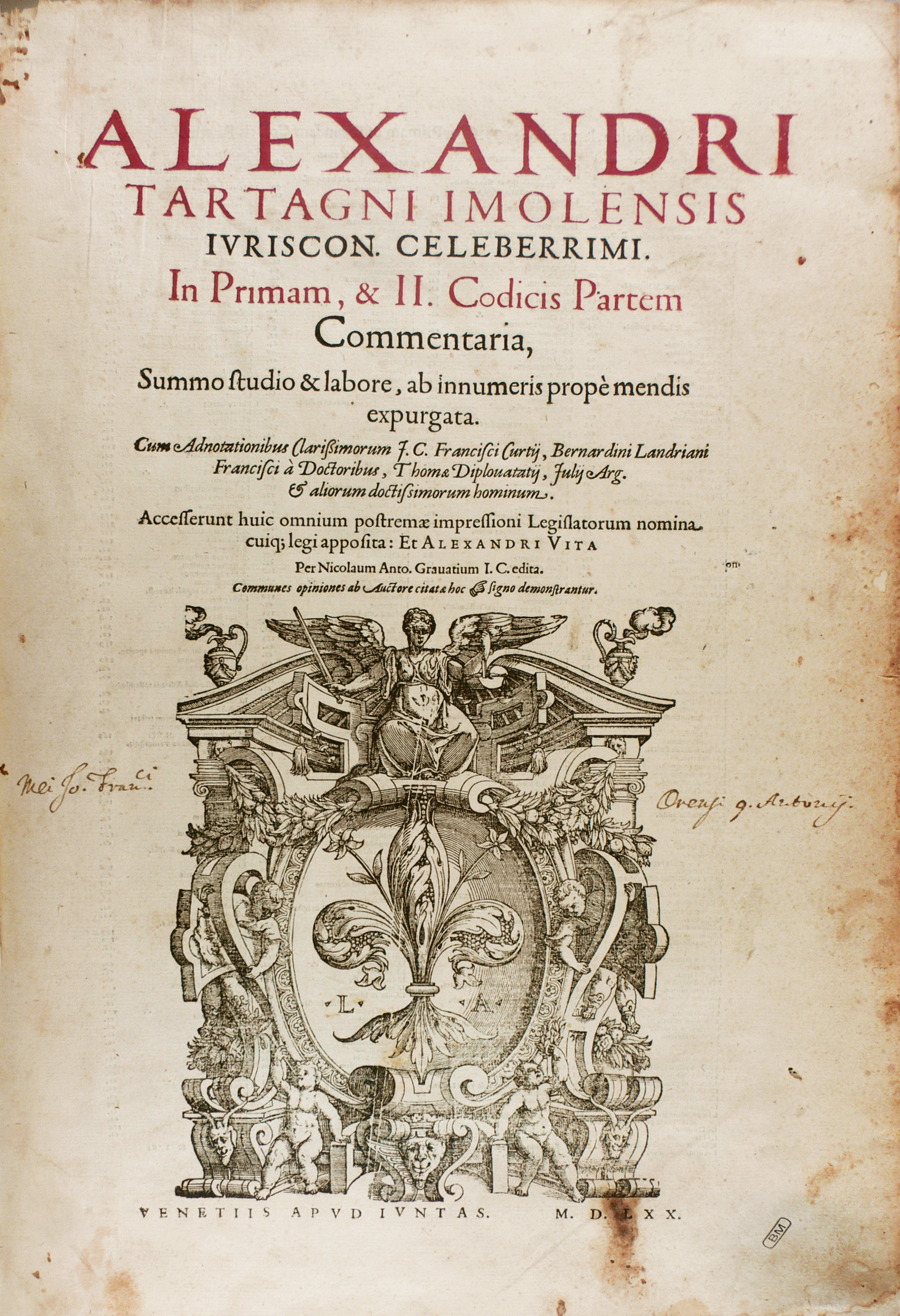
Codicis partem commentaria, 1570

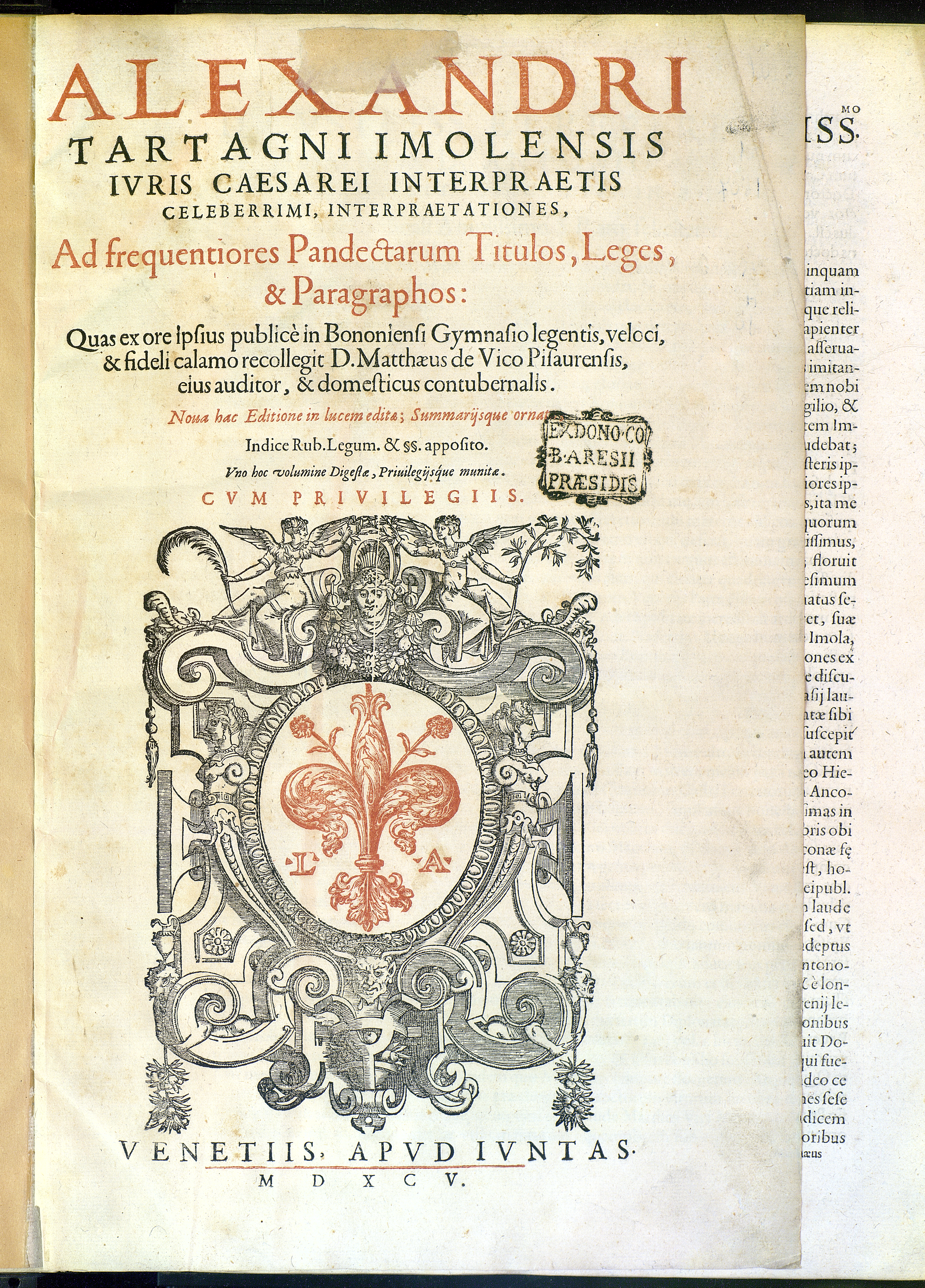
Interpraetationes ad frequentiores Pandectarum titulos, leges et paragraphos, 1595
