= Giasone del Maino =

Italian jurist

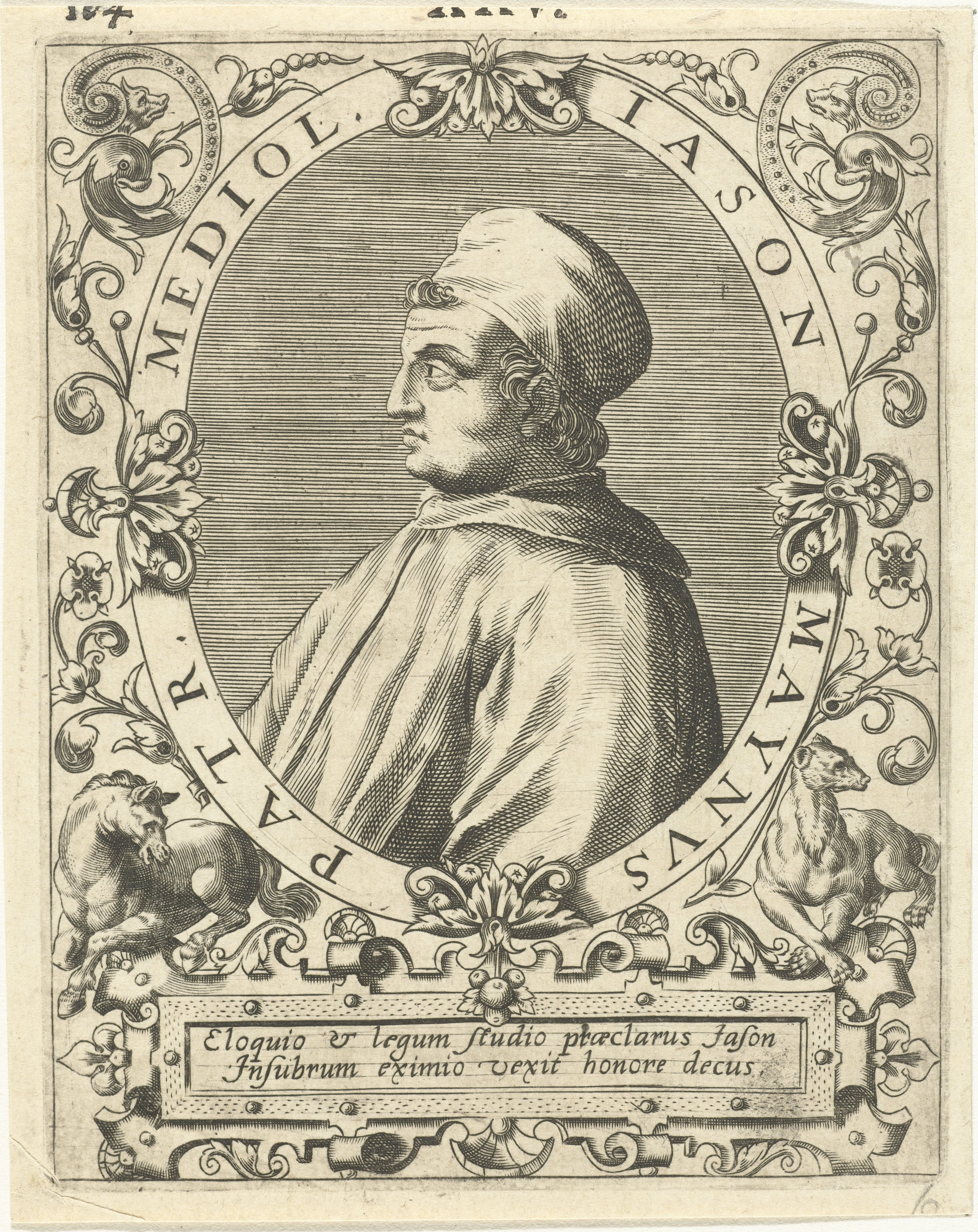
Jason de Mayno, portrayed in the Bibliotheca sive thesaurus virtutis, preserved in the Municipal Library of Trento (Italy)

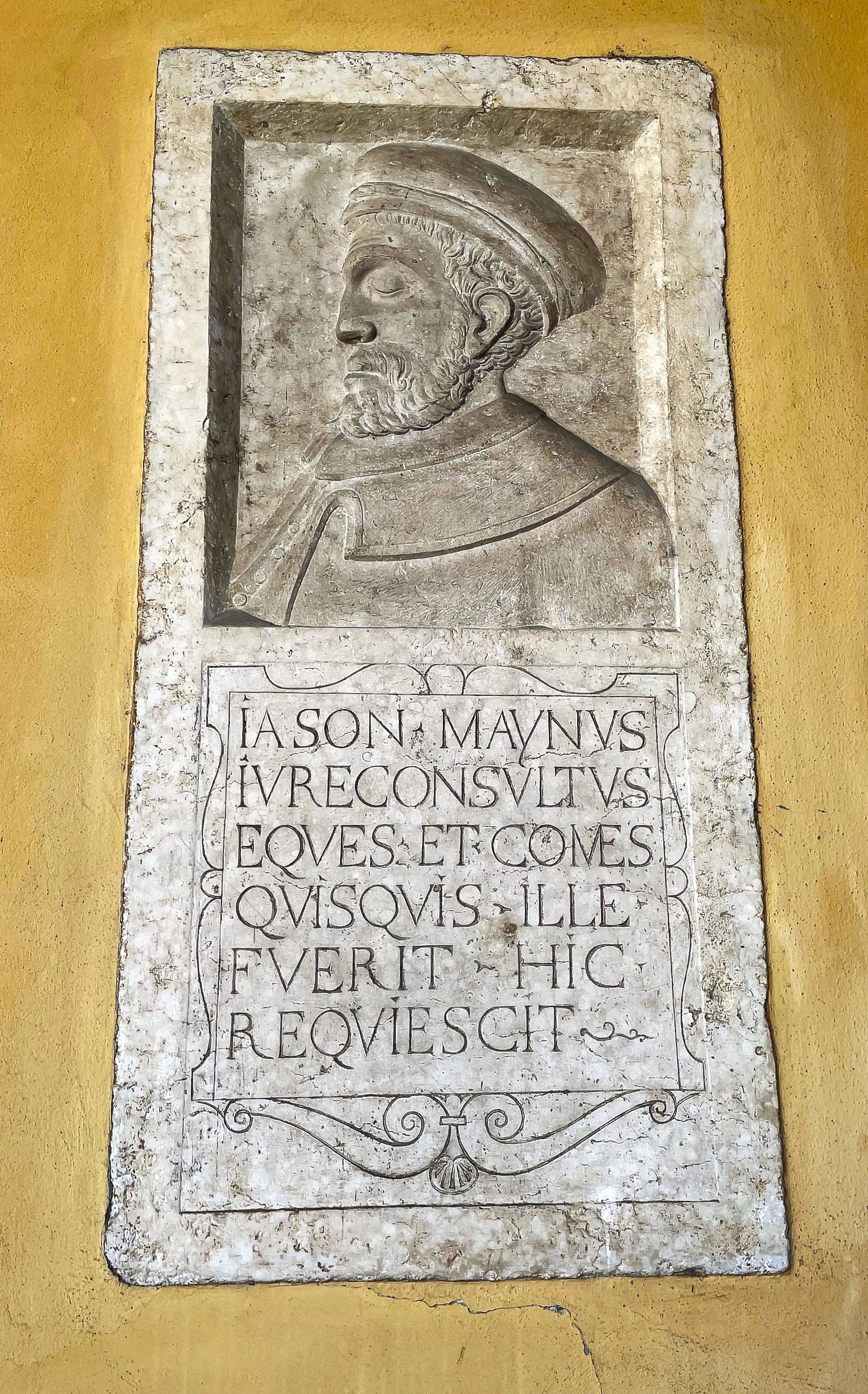
Gravestone of Giasone del Maino, 1519, Old Campus of the University of Pavia

Giasone del Maino (Jason of Mayno) (1435–1519) was an Italian jurist. With his pupil Filippo Decio he was one of the last of the Bartolist commentators on Roman law.

== Biography ==
Giasone del Maino was the illegitimate son of the patrician Andreotto del Maino. He was brought up in Milan, and studied law at the University of Pavia with the Bartolist jurist Alexander de Tartagnis. He taught at the University of Pavia from 1467 to 1486. After a few years in Padua, he returned to Pavia, where he lectured to large classes of Italian, French, and German students.

In 1494, he accompanied the Milanese ambassador Erasmo Brasca to the court of Emperor Maximilian. In 1507, he made a speech welcoming Louis XII of France. In that year, Andrea Alciato came to Pavia to study with him and his pupil Filippo Decio. He died in Milan in 1519.

Giasone del Maino belonged to the so-called school of the postglossators, who applied Scholastic methodology to both civil and canon law in order to develop universal legal principles. He distinguished himself for combining this rigorous method with profound Classical scholarship, which made him a forerunner of legal humanism. His commentary on the Digest was one of the most widely used commentaries of the sixteenth century.

== Works ==
- Repertorium in Iasonis Mayni Commentaria (in Latin). Venice: Lucantonio Giunta. 1585.
