= Filippo Decio =

Italian jurist (1454–c. 1535)

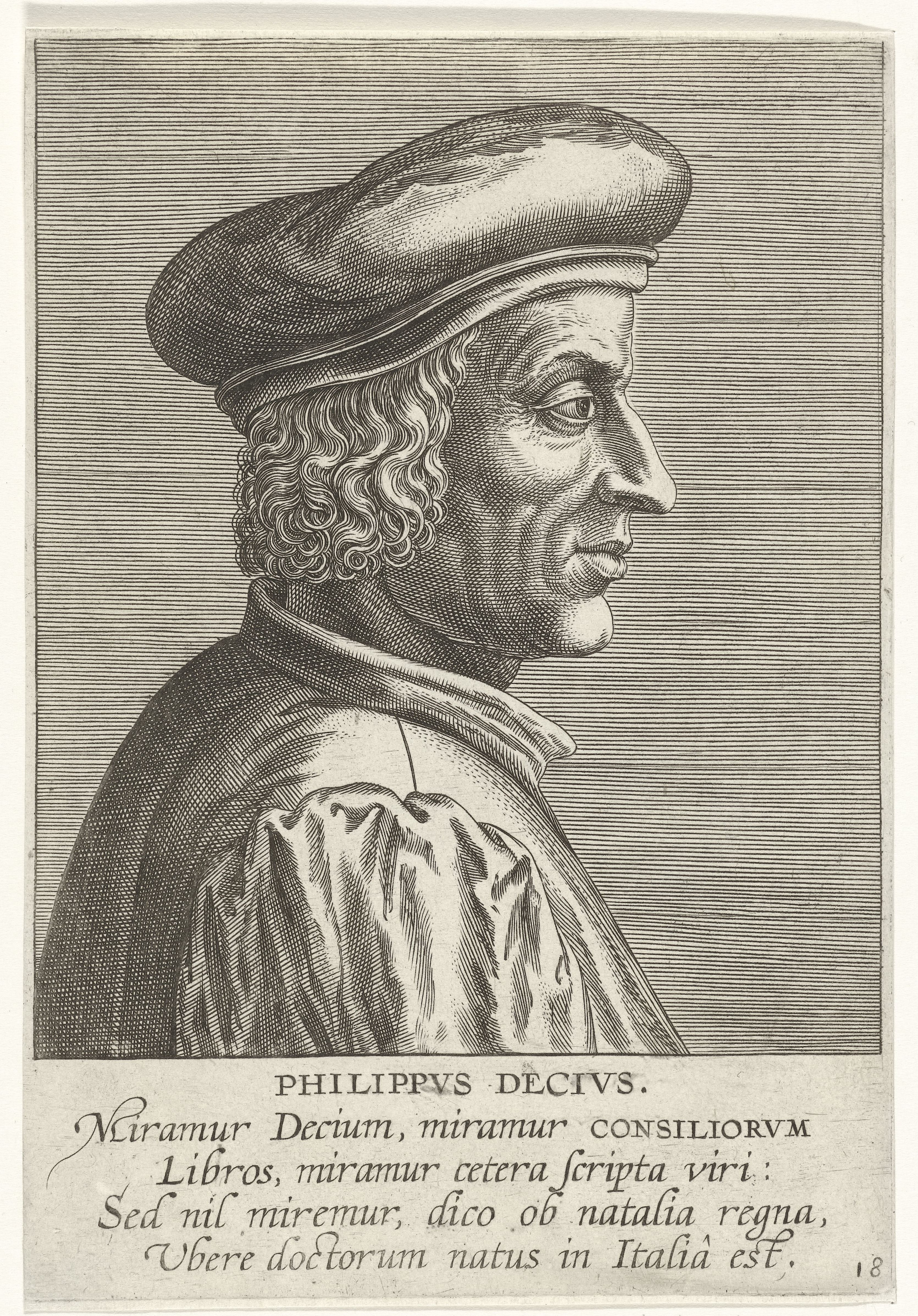
- Engraved portrait of Filippo Decio from Imagines L. Doctorum Virorum by Philip Galle
- Born: 1454; Milan, Duchy of Milan
- Died: 13 October 1535 (aged 80–81); Siena, Republic of Siena
- Other name: Philippus Decius
- Occupation: jurist

Filippo Decio or Decius (1454 – c. 1535) was an Italian jurist whose services were courted by European universities and rulers. He was an influential representative of the pre-Humanist scholastic ius commune tradition, and one of the leading jurists of his time together with Felino Sandeo, Antonio Cocchi Donati and Bartolomeo Socini.

== Life ==
Born into a Milanese noble family, Decio studied the humaniora and then law in Pavia under his brother Lancelotto and Jason de Mayno. In 1475, he attained a doctorate at Pisa, where he taught civil and canon law until 1502, except for a 1484–87 stint in Siena. After squabbles within the Pisan faculty, he taught canon law in Padua from 1502; his salary was 600 gold ducats.

In 1505, the French king Louis XII, who was in Milan, requested that he move to Pavia; the initial objections of the Republic of Venice were overcome, and he moved there at the end of the year. By 1511, his salary had risen to 2000 florins. Following departure of the French from Milan in April 1512, and the destruction of his home, his library and his manuscripts by the Swiss army, he followed Louis XII's call to Valence and became a member of the Grenoble parlement.

In 1516, the Duke of Tuscany succeeded in convincing Decio to return to Pisa, and in 1528, he moved to Siena.

According to Mariano Sozzini, he died in Siena on 13 October 1535. He is buried in the Camposanto Monumentale of Pisa, beneath a monument he himself commissioned before his death.

== Publications ==
Celebrated in his time as a teacher and jurist, Decio was the most prominent and among the most prolific of the last generation of commentators following in the tradition of Cinus, Bartolus and Baldus. His commentary of 1521 on the De regulis iuris of the Digests, begun at Valence and completed at Pisa, sets out the methodological principles and criteria for a systematic approach to the study of law.

His published works include:

- Apologia sacri Pisani Concilii moderni (auctore Ph. Decio). Pisis: per Palladium Bellonem Decium, sacri Pisani Concilii moderni calcographum, [1511]
- Philippi Decii ... Lectura super titulo de regulis iuris ff. edita in florentissima universitate Valentiae ubi tunc residebat & legebat cu[m] summo apparatu & maximo scolasticor[um] co[n]cursu .... Venetiis: impressa a Philippo Pincio, 1521 die 16 Januarij
- Commentaria in primam Digesti veteris partem: necnon in alias partes civiles ... Venetiis: De Tortis, 1523
  - In Digestum vetus et Codicem commentaria (in Latin). Venice: Giovanni Battista Somasco & fratelli. 1570.

== Bibliography ==
- Picinelli, Filippo (1670). Ateneo dei letterati milanesi. Milan: Vigone. pp. 190–1.
- Mazzacane, Aldo (1987). "Decio, Filippo". Dizionario Biografico degli Italiani (in Italian). Vol. 33: D'Asaro–De Foresta. Rome: Istituto dell'Enciclopedia Italiana. ISBN 978-88-12-00032-6.
- Holthöfer, Ernst (2001). "Decio, Filippo". In Michael Stolleis (ed.). Juristen: ein biographisches Lexikon; von der Antike bis zum 20. Jahrhundert (in German) (2nd ed.). München: Beck. pp. 171–173. ISBN 3-406-45957-9.
