= Jean d'Ailleboust =

French physician

Jean d'Ailleboust or Jean Ailleboust (in Latin Johannes Albosius) was a French doctor and physician. He practiced in Auxerre, then in Sens, before becoming first physician to King Henry III. He died on 24 July 1594. Maximilien de Béthune named him M. Alibour in Sully's Les Œconomies royales. It is also found under the names Daliboux and Dalibourg. François Rousset called him Alibosius and Antoine Portal called him Albosius.

== Biography ==
D'Ailleboust was a son of Pierre d'Ailleboust, ordinary physician to François I, Catholic, Autunois (died 21 August 1531), and Pérette de Séez, his wife. He received a doctorate in medicine at the University of Basel. He was the sixth boy and the seventh child (out of eight). He is the only one, with his sister Françoise, to have embraced the Reformed religion. His first sister Ferrine or Perrine, married Jean de Montrambault, a lawyer in Autun. His brother Jean (the eldest), was a canon of Autun, as well as his other brothers Anatole and Hugues, Charles d'Ailleboust, another brother is bishop of Autun, another André d'Ailleboust, was a merchant of Autun, lord of Collonge-la-Madeleine, married to Odette Rolet, the daughter of the mayor of Autun, Hugues Rolet, the last, Françoise, married Jean Lalemant, Calvinist, doctor in Autun, known for his mathematical works.

- Suzanne, who was married twice, the first to Christophe de Bolangiers and the second to Guillaume Duval, squire, lord of Malay-le-Roi and Villechétive;
- Mary, born on 24 January 1575, and who married in Saint-Germain-en-Laye, Jean Bedeu, lawyer;
- Jean, born around 1576, lawyer in parliament, husband of Marie Conseil.

From 1576 to 1583, he was physician to Duke François d'Alençon (brother of Henry III). He was forced to flee because of his religion and appears in 1586 in a list of Protestant refugees in Montbéliard. In 1590, he became adviser and first doctor to Henri IV (with 3000 pounds tournament wages). In 1592, he is said to have diagnosed infertility resulting from a venereal disease in Henri IV (he was his first surgeon).

== Works ==
- Reprinted under the title Observatio lithopœdi Senosensis in Basel in 1588, In-8°
- Also in Latin in: Hysterotomotokia [ archive ] by François Rousset, as well as in a collection of pamphlets: De diuturnà graviditate, Amsterdam, 1662, in-12° 22
- Exercitatio de hujus indurationis causis naturalibus, Sens, 1587, in-8°
