= Barnay (disambiguation) =

Barnay is a commune in the Saône-et-Loire department in the region of Bourgogne in eastern France.

Barnay may also refer to:

- Ghislaine Barnay (born 1945), French high jumper
- Ludwig Barnay (1842–1924), German stage actor
