= La Celle-en-Morvan =

- Commune
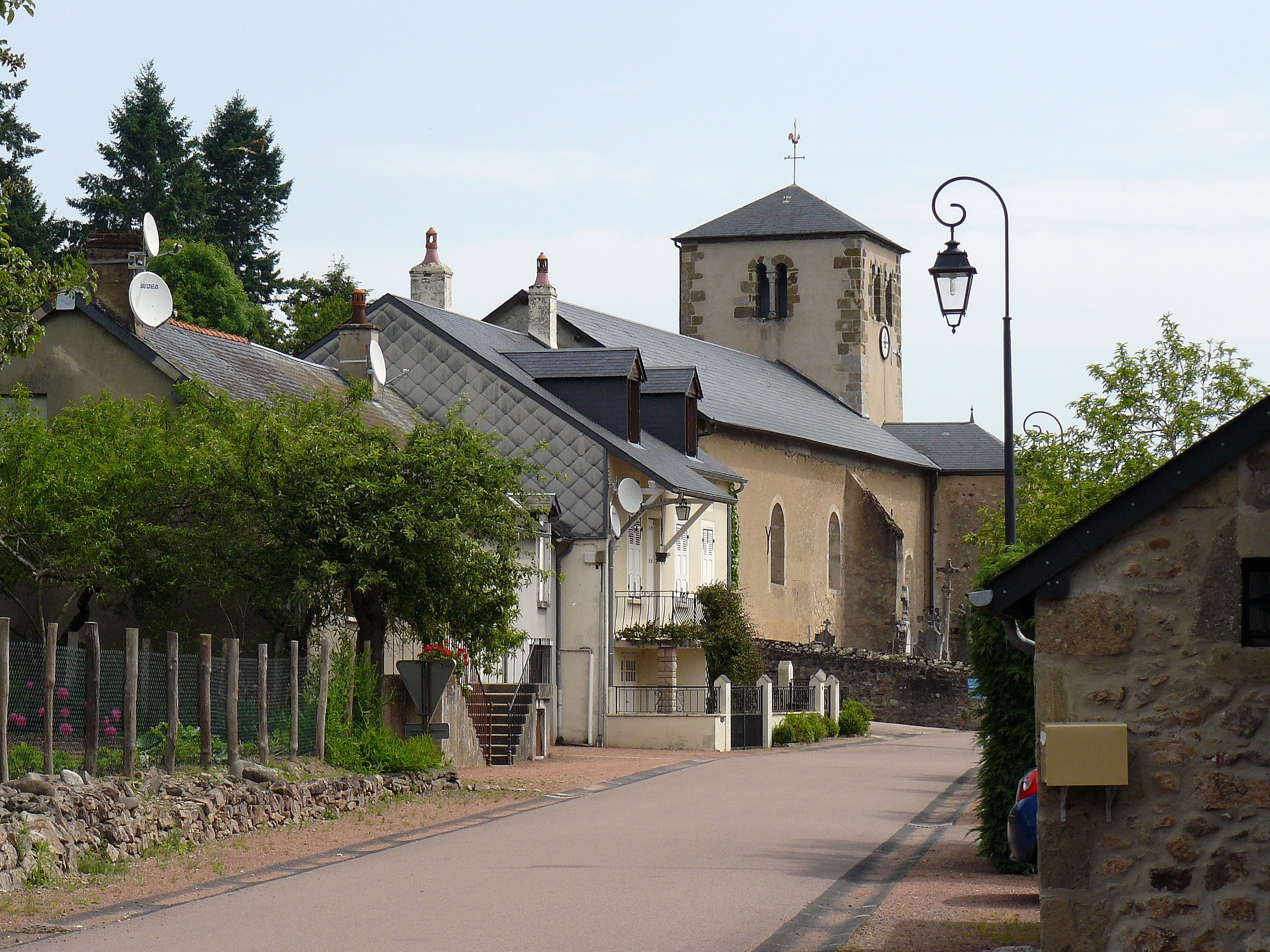
- The church and surroundings in La Celle-en-Morvan
- Location of La Celle-en-Morvan
- Location within France Location within Bourgogne-Franche-Comté
- Coordinates: 47°00′47″N 4°10′59″E
- Country: France
- Region: Bourgogne-Franche-Comté
- Department: Saône-et-Loire
- Arrondissement: Autun
- Canton: Autun-1
- Intercommunality: Grand Autunois Morvan
- Area^{1}: 20.17 km^{2} (7.79 sq mi)
- Elevation: 347 m (1,138 ft)
- Highest elevation: 590 m (1,940 ft)
- Lowest elevation: 307 m (1,007 ft)
- Population (2023): 452
  - Density: 22.4/km^{2} (58.0/sq mi)
- Time zone: UTC+01:00 (CET)
  - Summer (DST): UTC+02:00 (CEST)
- INSEE/Postal code: 71509 /71400
- ^{1} French Land Register data, which excludes lakes, ponds, glaciers > 1 km^{2} (0.386 sq mi or 247 acres) and river estuaries.

La Celle-en-Morvan (French pronunciation: [la sɛl ɑ̃ mɔʁvɑ̃], lit. 'La Celle-in-Morvan') is a commune in the Saône-et-Loire department in the region of Bourgogne-Franche-Comté in central-east France.

== See also ==
- Communes of the Saône-et-Loire department
- Parc naturel régional du Morvan
