= Curgy =

- Commune
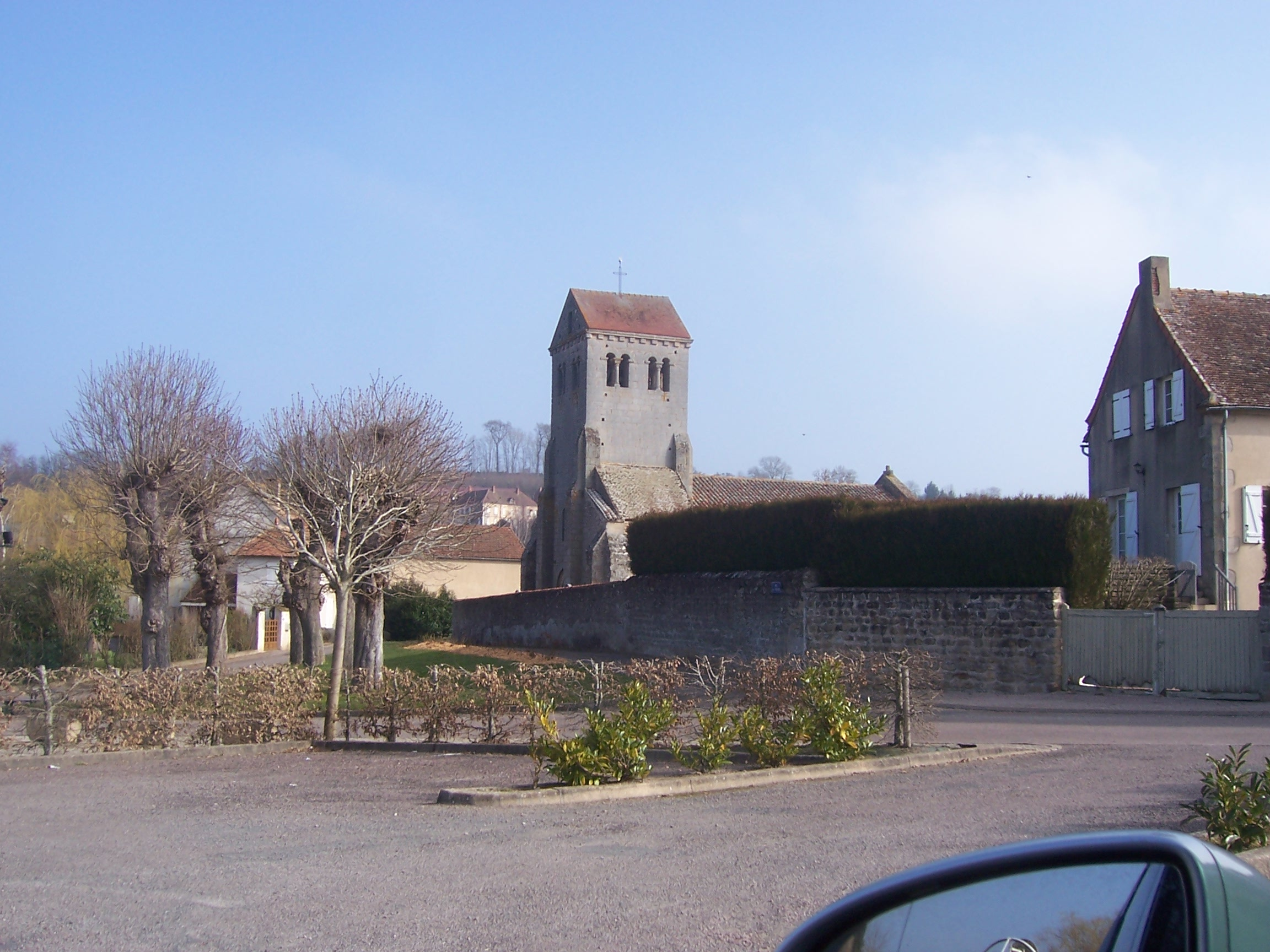
- The church in Curgy
- Location of Curgy
- Location within France Location within Bourgogne-Franche-Comté
- Coordinates: 46°59′08″N 4°23′03″E
- Country: France
- Region: Bourgogne-Franche-Comté
- Department: Saône-et-Loire
- Arrondissement: Autun
- Canton: Autun-1
- Area^{1}: 31.58 km^{2} (12.19 sq mi)
- Elevation: 450 m (1,480 ft)
- Highest elevation: 537 m (1,762 ft)
- Lowest elevation: 299 m (981 ft)
- Population (2023): 1,094
  - Density: 34.64/km^{2} (89.72/sq mi)
- Time zone: UTC+01:00 (CET)
  - Summer (DST): UTC+02:00 (CEST)
- INSEE/Postal code: 71162 /71400
- ^{1} French Land Register data, which excludes lakes, ponds, glaciers > 1 km^{2} (0.386 sq mi or 247 acres) and river estuaries.

Curgy (French pronunciation: [kyʁʒi]) is a commune in the Saône-et-Loire department in the region of Bourgogne-Franche-Comté in eastern France.

== See also ==
- Communes of the Saône-et-Loire department
