= Saint-Gervais-sur-Couches =

- Commune
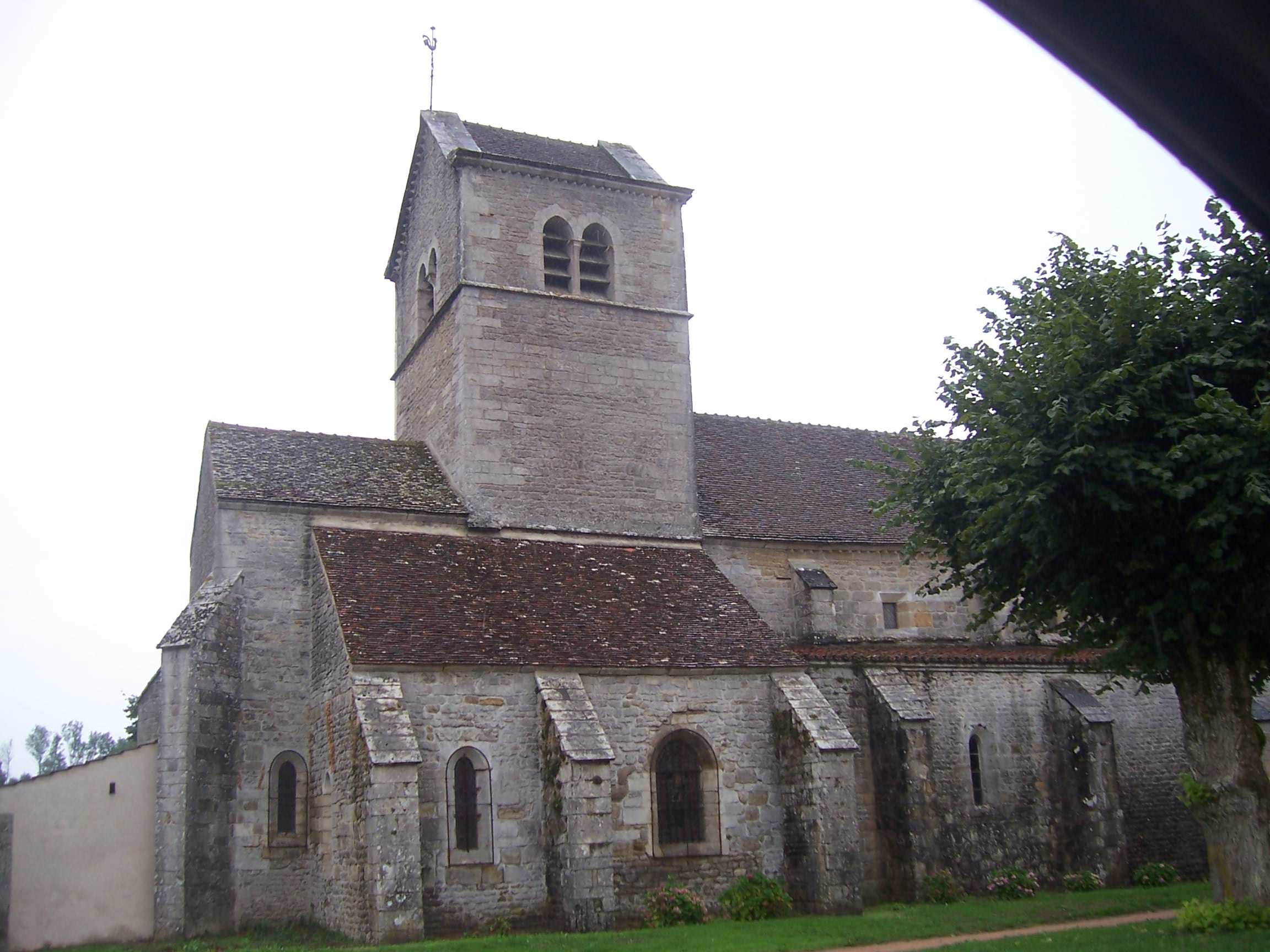
- The church in Saint-Gervais-sur-Couches
- Location of Saint-Gervais-sur-Couches
- Location within France Location within Bourgogne-Franche-Comté
- Coordinates: 46°55′16″N 4°35′05″E
- Country: France
- Region: Bourgogne-Franche-Comté
- Department: Saône-et-Loire
- Arrondissement: Autun
- Canton: Autun-1
- Area^{1}: 20.47 km^{2} (7.90 sq mi)
- Elevation: 486 m (1,594 ft)
- Highest elevation: 510 m (1,670 ft)
- Lowest elevation: 367 m (1,204 ft)
- Population (2023): 209
  - Density: 10.2/km^{2} (26.4/sq mi)
- Time zone: UTC+01:00 (CET)
  - Summer (DST): UTC+02:00 (CEST)
- INSEE/Postal code: 71424 /71490
- ^{1} French Land Register data, which excludes lakes, ponds, glaciers > 1 km^{2} (0.386 sq mi or 247 acres) and river estuaries.

Saint-Gervais-sur-Couches (French pronunciation: [sɛ̃ ʒɛʁvɛ syʁ kuʃ], literally Saint-Gervais on Couches) is a commune in the Saône-et-Loire department in the region of Bourgogne-Franche-Comté in eastern France.

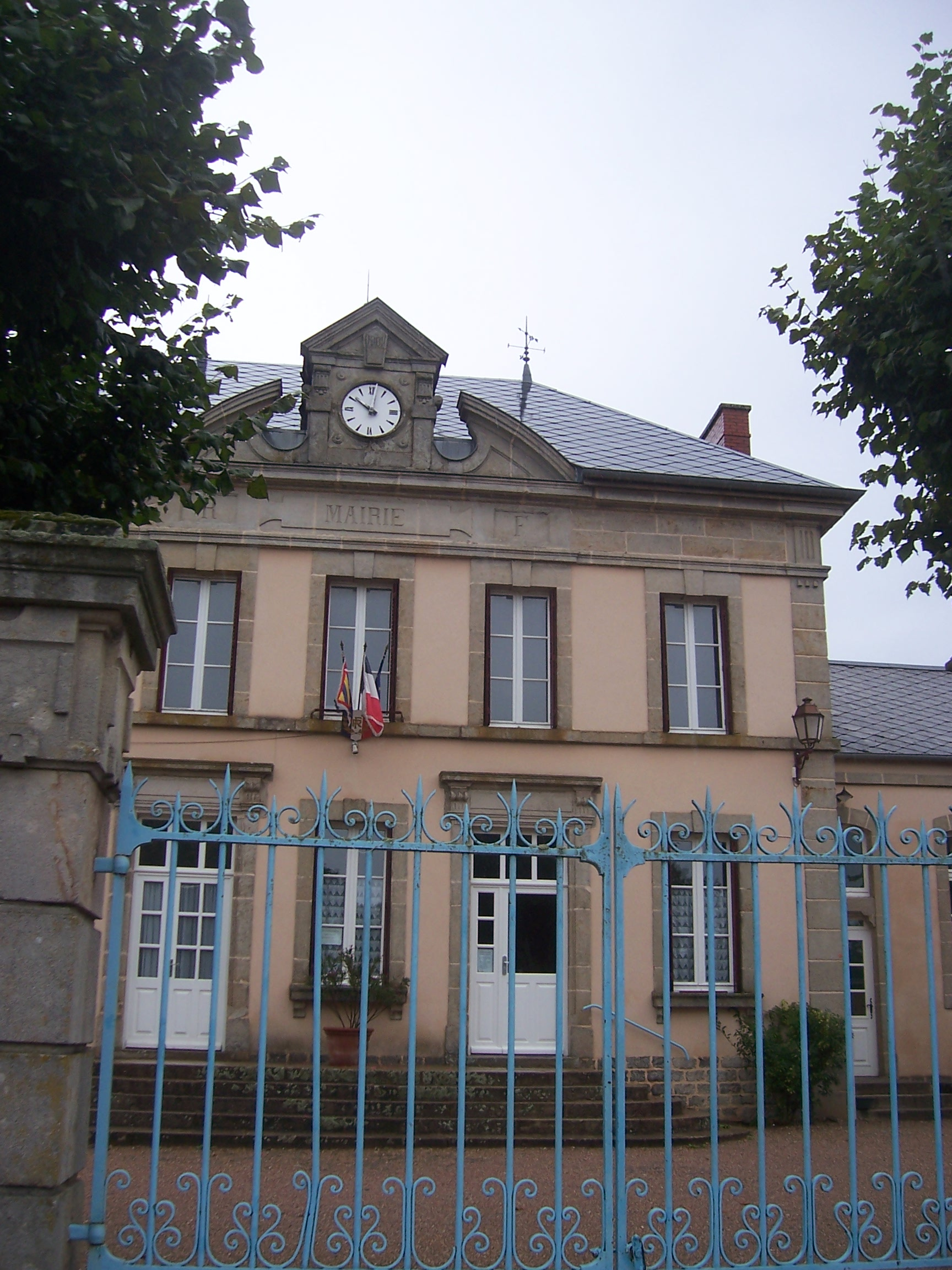
Town hall

== See also ==
- Communes of the Saône-et-Loire department
