= Monthelon, Saône-et-Loire =

Monthelon
- Commune
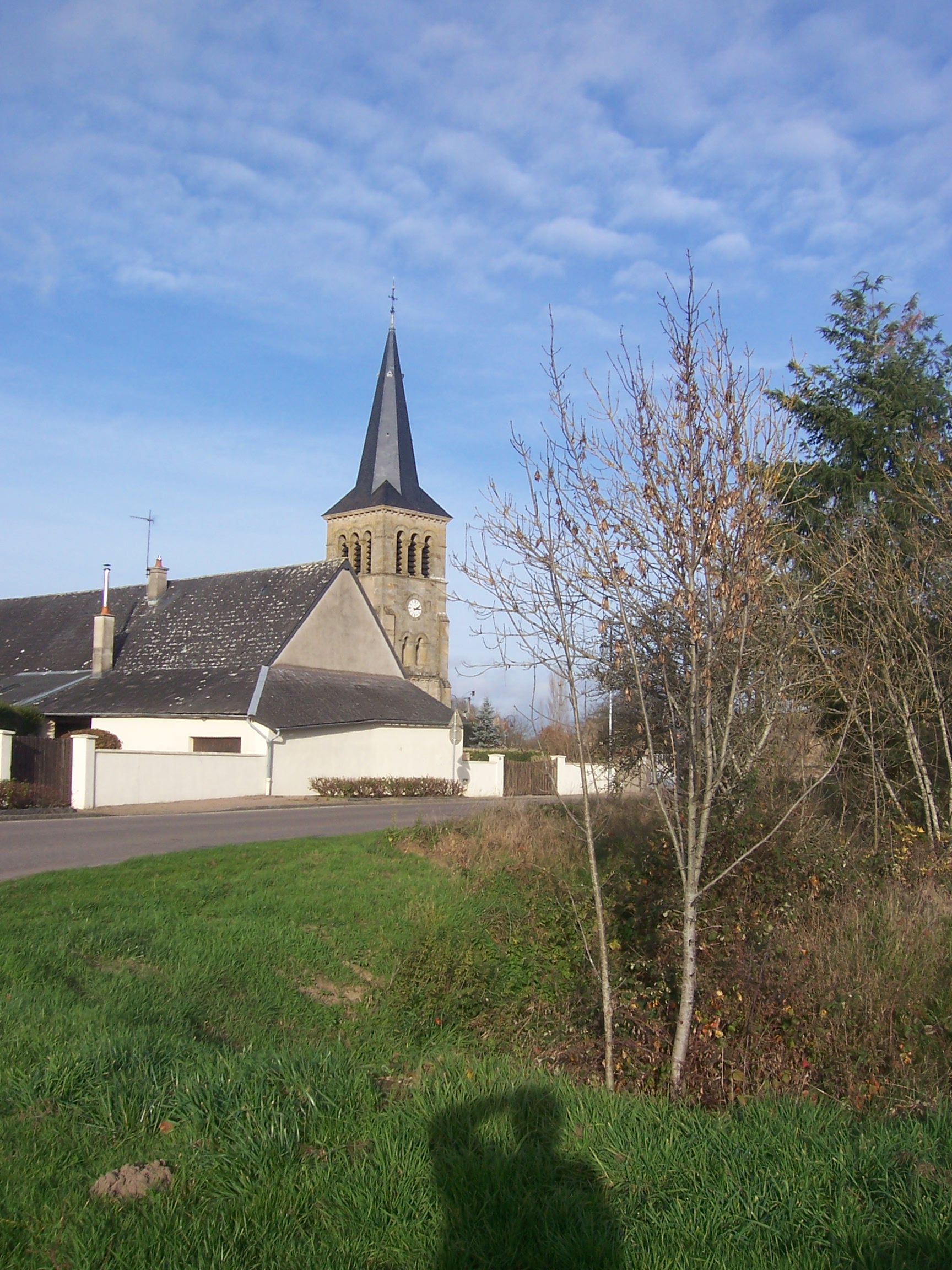
- The church in Monthelon
- Location of Monthelon
- Location within France Location within Bourgogne-Franche-Comté
- Coordinates: 46°57′30″N 4°13′32″E
- Country: France
- Region: Bourgogne-Franche-Comté
- Department: Saône-et-Loire
- Arrondissement: Autun
- Canton: Autun-1
- Area^{1}: 24.57 km^{2} (9.49 sq mi)
- Elevation: 345 m (1,132 ft)
- Highest elevation: 385 m (1,263 ft)
- Lowest elevation: 278 m (912 ft)
- Population (2023): 367
  - Density: 14.9/km^{2} (38.7/sq mi)
- Time zone: UTC+01:00 (CET)
  - Summer (DST): UTC+02:00 (CEST)
- INSEE/Postal code: 71313 /71400
- ^{1} French Land Register data, which excludes lakes, ponds, glaciers > 1 km^{2} (0.386 sq mi or 247 acres) and river estuaries.

Monthelon (French pronunciation: [mɔ̃tlɔ̃]) is a commune in the Saône-et-Loire department in the region of Bourgogne-Franche-Comté in eastern France. It is located just west of Autun.

== See also ==
- Communes of the Saône-et-Loire department
