= Morlet =

- Commune
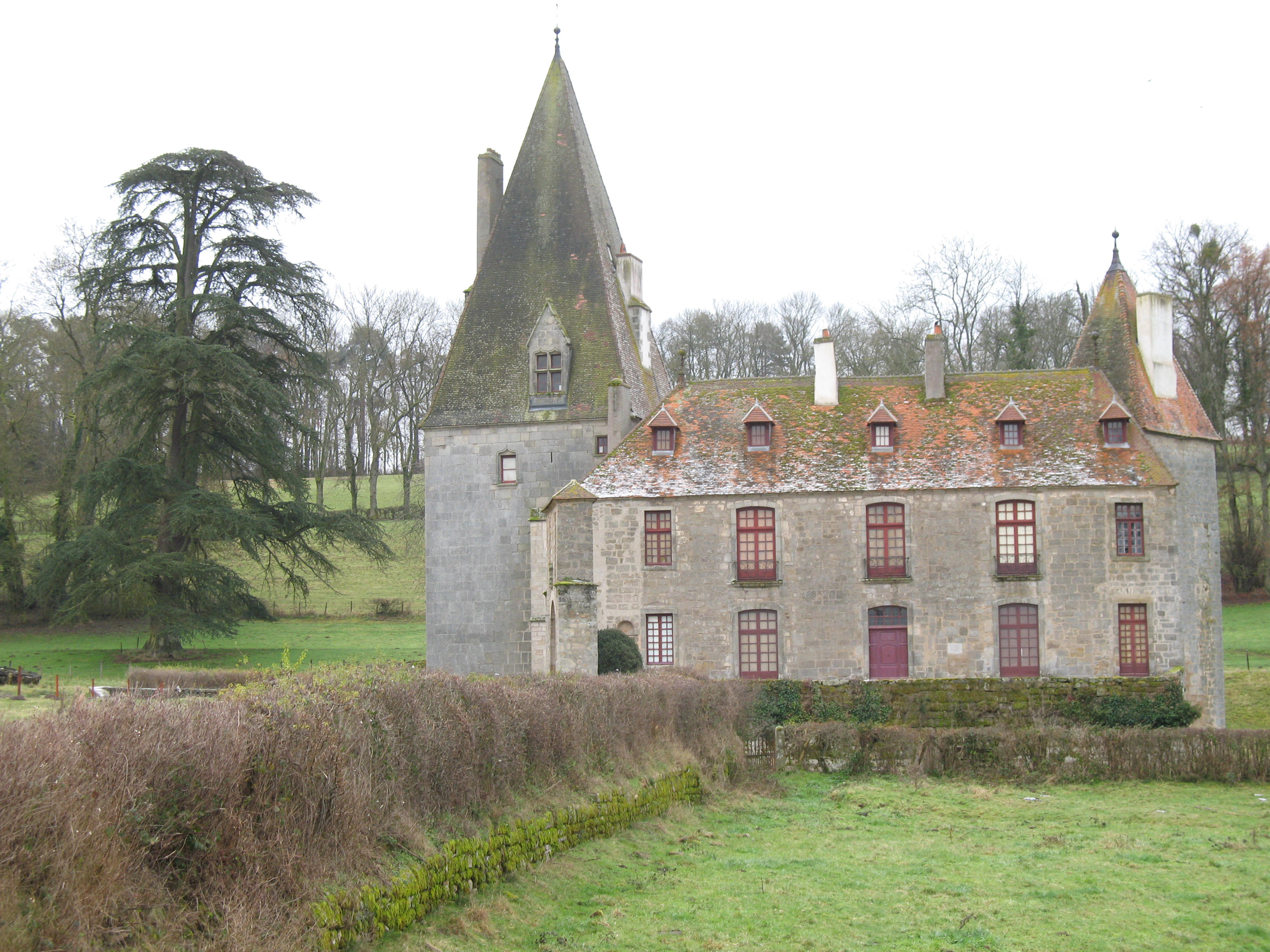
- Chateau
- Location of Morlet
- Location within France Location within Bourgogne-Franche-Comté
- Coordinates: 46°57′19″N 4°30′33″E
- Country: France
- Region: Bourgogne-Franche-Comté
- Department: Saône-et-Loire
- Arrondissement: Autun
- Canton: Autun-1
- Area^{1}: 6.69 km^{2} (2.58 sq mi)
- Elevation: 360 m (1,180 ft)
- Highest elevation: 457 m (1,499 ft)
- Lowest elevation: 343 m (1,125 ft)
- Population (2023): 71
  - Density: 11/km^{2} (27/sq mi)
- Time zone: UTC+01:00 (CET)
  - Summer (DST): UTC+02:00 (CEST)
- INSEE/Postal code: 71322 /71360
- ^{1} French Land Register data, which excludes lakes, ponds, glaciers > 1 km^{2} (0.386 sq mi or 247 acres) and river estuaries.

Morlet (French pronunciation: [mɔʁlɛ]) is a commune in the Saône-et-Loire department in the region of Bourgogne-Franche-Comté in France.

== Demographics ==
At the census of 1999, the population was 74.

== See also ==
- Communes of the Saône-et-Loire department
