= Créot =

- Commune
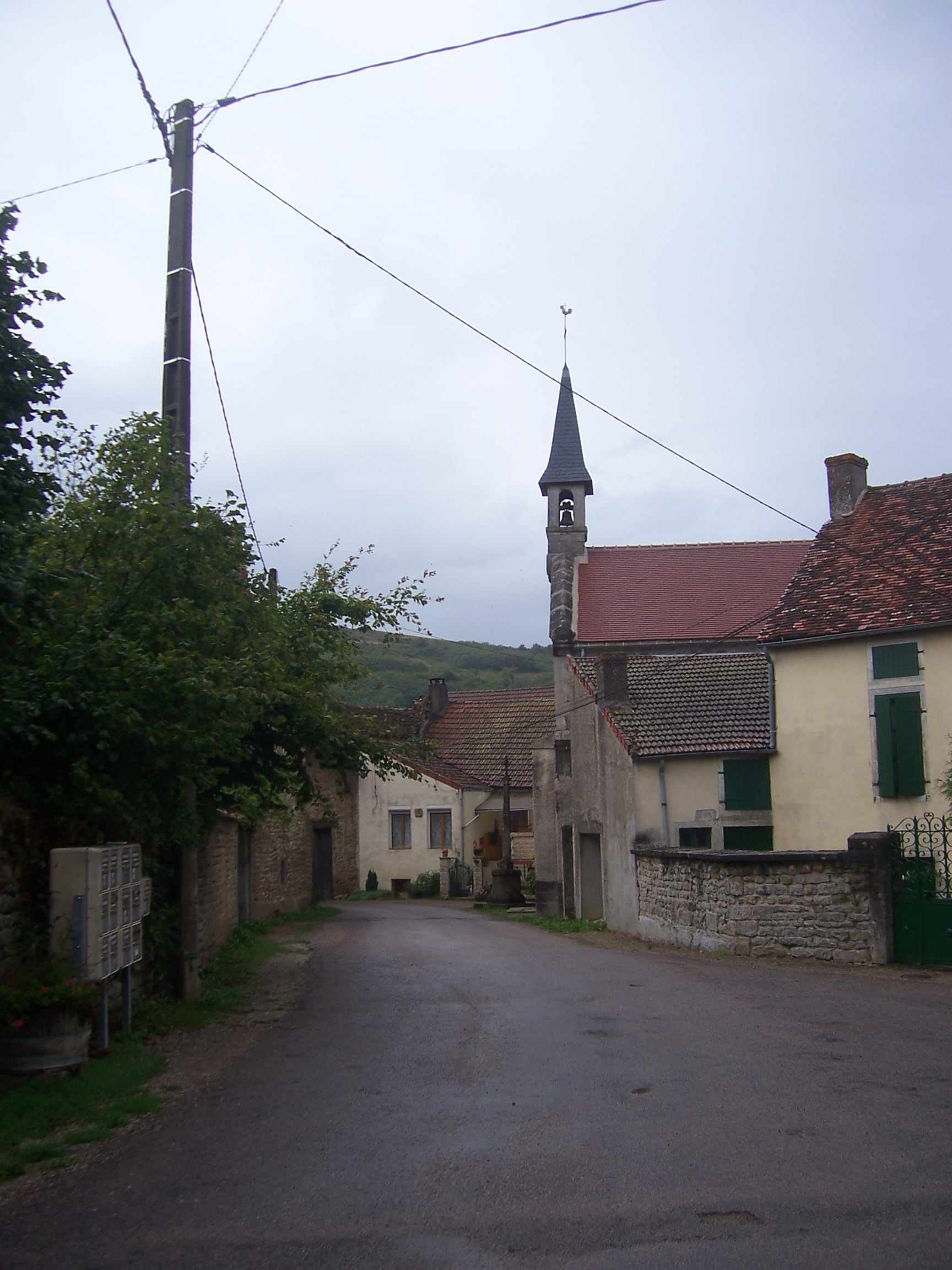
- The church in Créot
- Location of Créot
- Location within France Location within Bourgogne-Franche-Comté
- Coordinates: 46°55′07″N 4°36′50″E
- Country: France
- Region: Bourgogne-Franche-Comté
- Department: Saône-et-Loire
- Arrondissement: Autun
- Canton: Autun-1
- Area^{1}: 2.17 km^{2} (0.84 sq mi)
- Elevation: 476 m (1,562 ft)
- Highest elevation: 500 m (1,600 ft)
- Lowest elevation: 282 m (925 ft)
- Population (2023): 79
  - Density: 36/km^{2} (94/sq mi)
- Time zone: UTC+01:00 (CET)
  - Summer (DST): UTC+02:00 (CEST)
- INSEE/Postal code: 71151 /71490
- ^{1} French Land Register data, which excludes lakes, ponds, glaciers > 1 km^{2} (0.386 sq mi or 247 acres) and river estuaries.

Créot (French pronunciation: [kʁeo]) is a commune in the Saône-et-Loire department in the region of Bourgogne-Franche-Comté in eastern France.

== See also ==
- Communes of the Saône-et-Loire department
