= Roussillon-en-Morvan =

- Commune
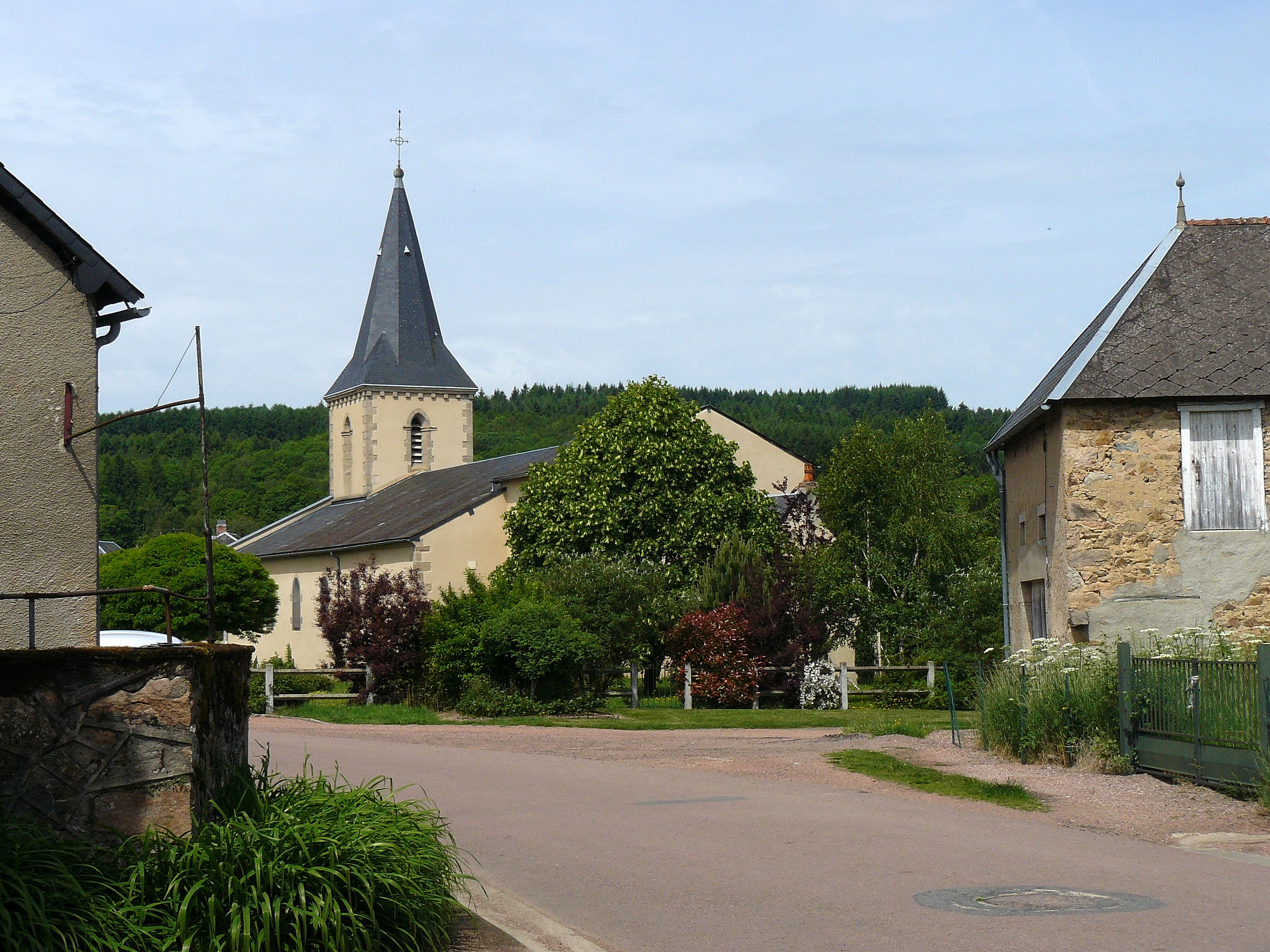
- Church and village centre
- Location of Roussillon-en-Morvan
- Location within France Location within Bourgogne-Franche-Comté
- Coordinates: 47°01′38″N 4°07′14″E
- Country: France
- Region: Bourgogne-Franche-Comté
- Department: Saône-et-Loire
- Arrondissement: Autun
- Canton: Autun-1

Government
  - Mayor (2020–2026): Gérard Tremeray
- Area^{1}: 30.59 km^{2} (11.81 sq mi)
- Elevation: 550 m (1,800 ft)
- Highest elevation: 845 m (2,772 ft)
- Lowest elevation: 370 m (1,210 ft)
- Population (2023): 272
  - Density: 8.89/km^{2} (23.0/sq mi)
- Time zone: UTC+01:00 (CET)
  - Summer (DST): UTC+02:00 (CEST)
- INSEE/Postal code: 71376 /71550
- ^{1} French Land Register data, which excludes lakes, ponds, glaciers > 1 km^{2} (0.386 sq mi or 247 acres) and river estuaries.

Roussillon-en-Morvan (French pronunciation: [ʁusijɔ̃ ɑ̃ mɔʁvɑ̃]; lit. 'Roussillon-in-Morvan') is a rural commune in the Saône-et-Loire department in the Bourgogne-Franche-Comté region in central-east France. As of 2023, the population of the commune was 272. It covers an area of 30.59 km^{2} (11.81 sq mi).

There has been a church in Roussillon-en-Morvan since the 9th century, as the village is located on the former Gallo-Roman road between Autun and Orléans via Château-Chinon, which runs through the forests of Glenne and Folin. The commune is part of Morvan Regional Natural Park.

== See also ==
- Communes of the Saône-et-Loire department
- Morvan Regional Natural Park
