= Cordesse =

- Commune
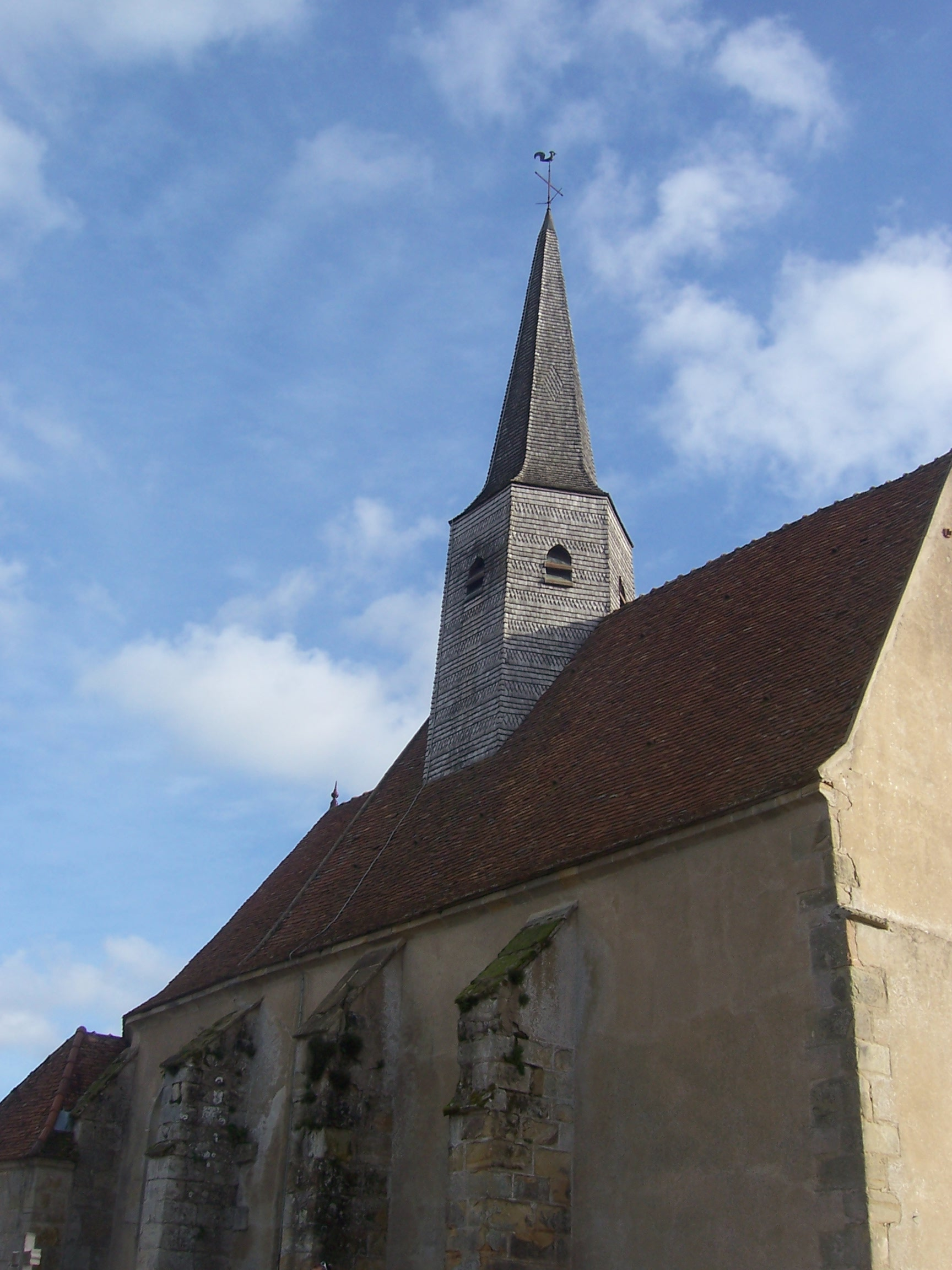
- The church in Cordesse
- Location of Cordesse
- Location within France Location within Bourgogne-Franche-Comté
- Coordinates: 47°02′20″N 4°20′37″E
- Country: France
- Region: Bourgogne-Franche-Comté
- Department: Saône-et-Loire
- Arrondissement: Autun
- Canton: Autun-1
- Intercommunality: Grand Autunois Morvan

Government
  - Mayor (2020–2026): Gérard Bergeret
- Area^{1}: 10.52 km^{2} (4.06 sq mi)
- Elevation: 310 m (1,020 ft)
- Highest elevation: 505 m (1,657 ft)
- Lowest elevation: 295 m (968 ft)
- Population (2023): 194
  - Density: 18.4/km^{2} (47.8/sq mi)
- Time zone: UTC+01:00 (CET)
  - Summer (DST): UTC+02:00 (CEST)
- INSEE/Postal code: 71144 /71540
- ^{1} French Land Register data, which excludes lakes, ponds, glaciers > 1 km^{2} (0.386 sq mi or 247 acres) and river estuaries.

Cordesse (French pronunciation: [kɔʁdɛs]) is a commune in the Saône-et-Loire department in the region of Bourgogne-Franche-Comté in eastern France. It is located north of Autun.

== See also ==
- Communes of the Saône-et-Loire department
