= Tintry =

- Commune
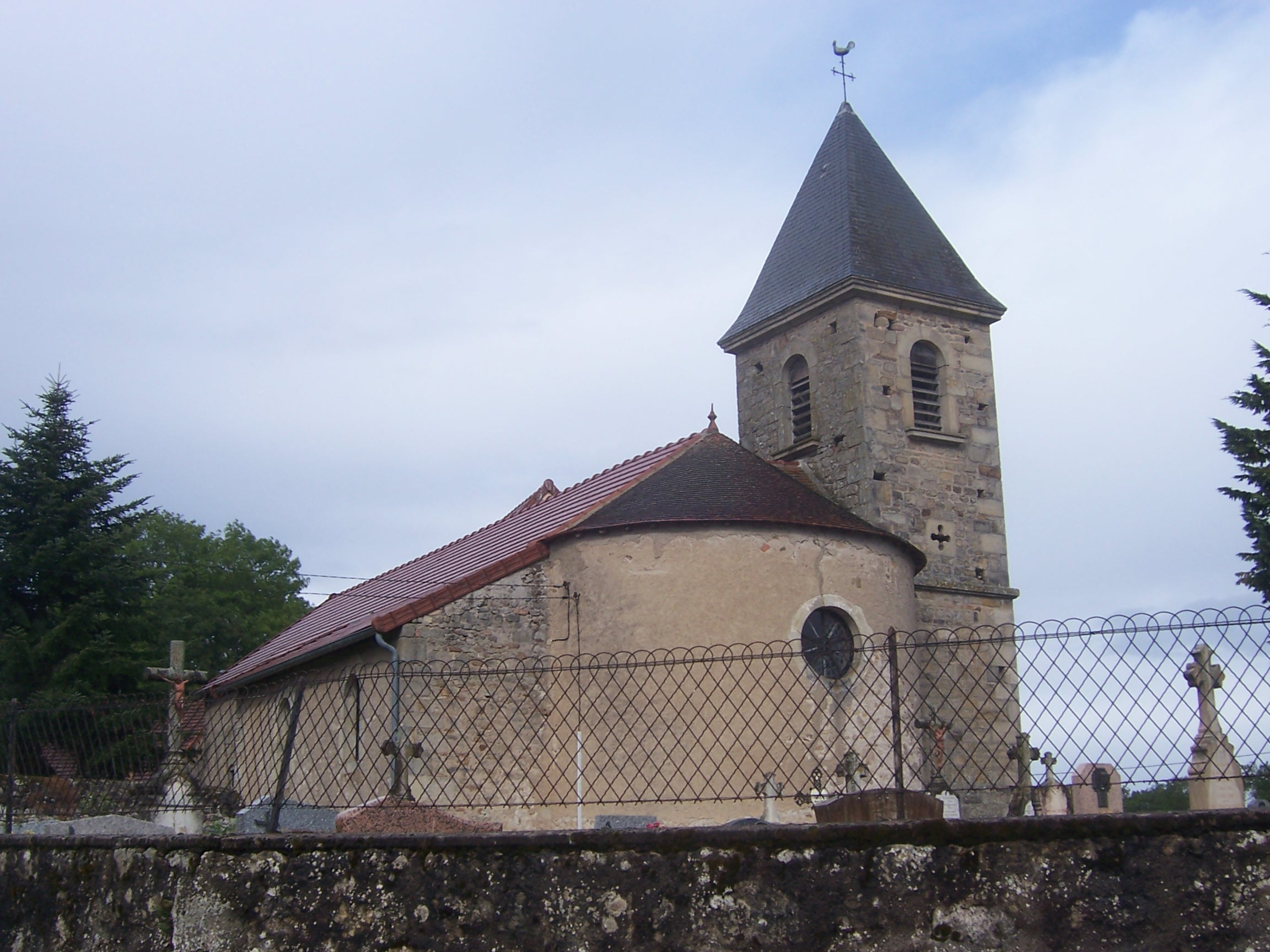
- The church in Tintry
- Location of Tintry
- Location within France Location within Bourgogne-Franche-Comté
- Coordinates: 46°55′53″N 4°29′44″E
- Country: France
- Region: Bourgogne-Franche-Comté
- Department: Saône-et-Loire
- Arrondissement: Autun
- Canton: Autun-1
- Area^{1}: 9.66 km^{2} (3.73 sq mi)
- Elevation: 473 m (1,552 ft)
- Highest elevation: 472 m (1,549 ft)
- Lowest elevation: 345 m (1,132 ft)
- Population (2023): 80
  - Density: 8.3/km^{2} (21/sq mi)
- Time zone: UTC+01:00 (CET)
  - Summer (DST): UTC+02:00 (CEST)
- INSEE/Postal code: 71539 /71490
- ^{1} French Land Register data, which excludes lakes, ponds, glaciers > 1 km^{2} (0.386 sq mi or 247 acres) and river estuaries.

Tintry (French pronunciation: [tɛ̃tʁi]) is a commune in the Saône-et-Loire department in the region of Bourgogne-Franche-Comté in eastern France.

== See also ==
- Communes of the Saône-et-Loire department
