= Tavernay =

- Commune
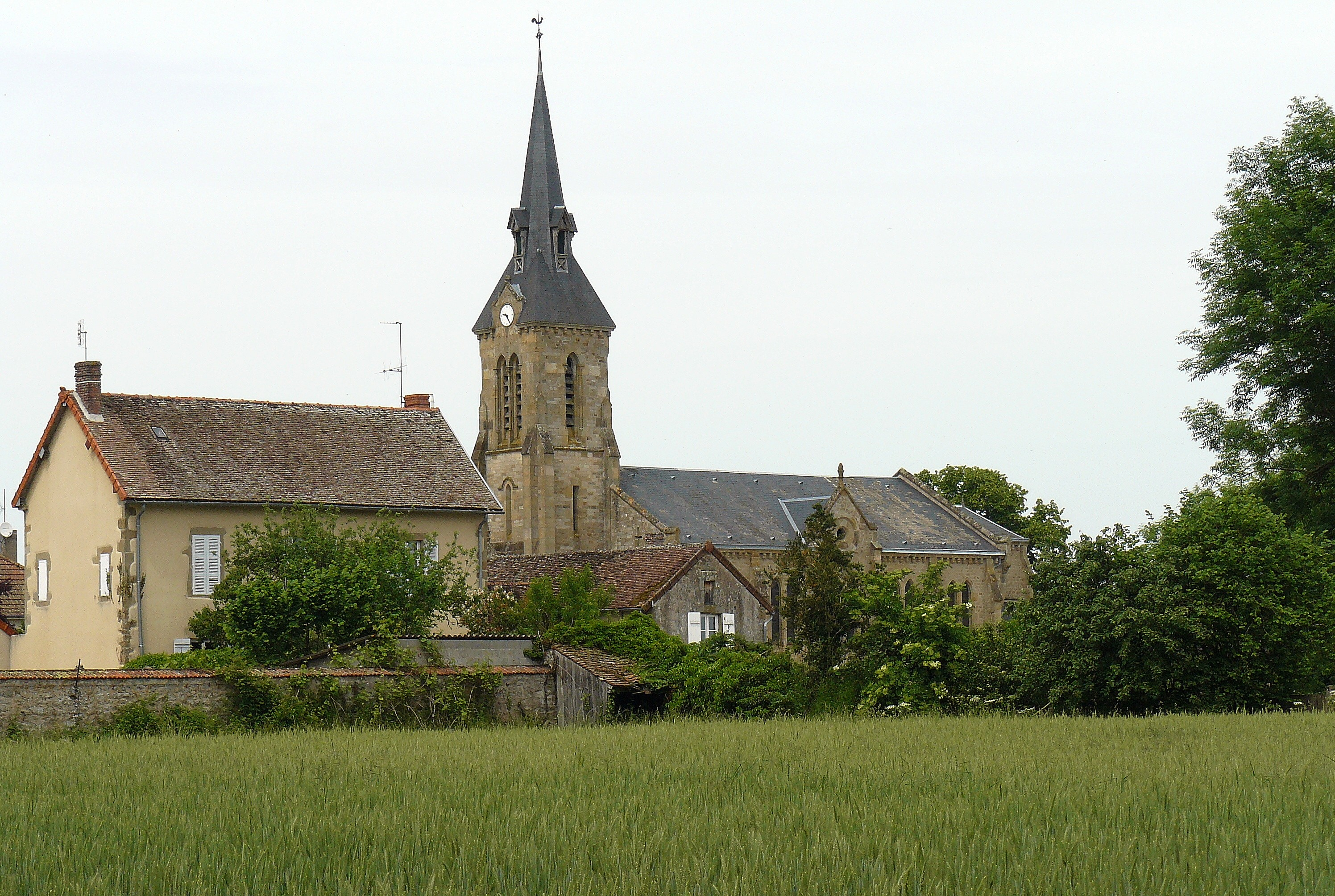
- The church in Tavernay
- Location of Tavernay
- Location within France Location within Bourgogne-Franche-Comté
- Coordinates: 47°00′54″N 4°14′07″E
- Country: France
- Region: Bourgogne-Franche-Comté
- Department: Saône-et-Loire
- Arrondissement: Autun
- Canton: Autun-1
- Area^{1}: 25.56 km^{2} (9.87 sq mi)
- Elevation: 315 m (1,033 ft)
- Highest elevation: 480 m (1,570 ft)
- Lowest elevation: 294 m (965 ft)
- Population (2023): 493
  - Density: 19.3/km^{2} (50.0/sq mi)
- Time zone: UTC+01:00 (CET)
  - Summer (DST): UTC+02:00 (CEST)
- INSEE/Postal code: 71535 /71400
- ^{1} French Land Register data, which excludes lakes, ponds, glaciers > 1 km^{2} (0.386 sq mi or 247 acres) and river estuaries.

Tavernay (French pronunciation: [tavɛʁnɛ]) is a commune in the Saône-et-Loire department in the region of Bourgogne-Franche-Comté in eastern France.

== See also ==
- Communes of the Saône-et-Loire department
