= Sommant =

- Commune
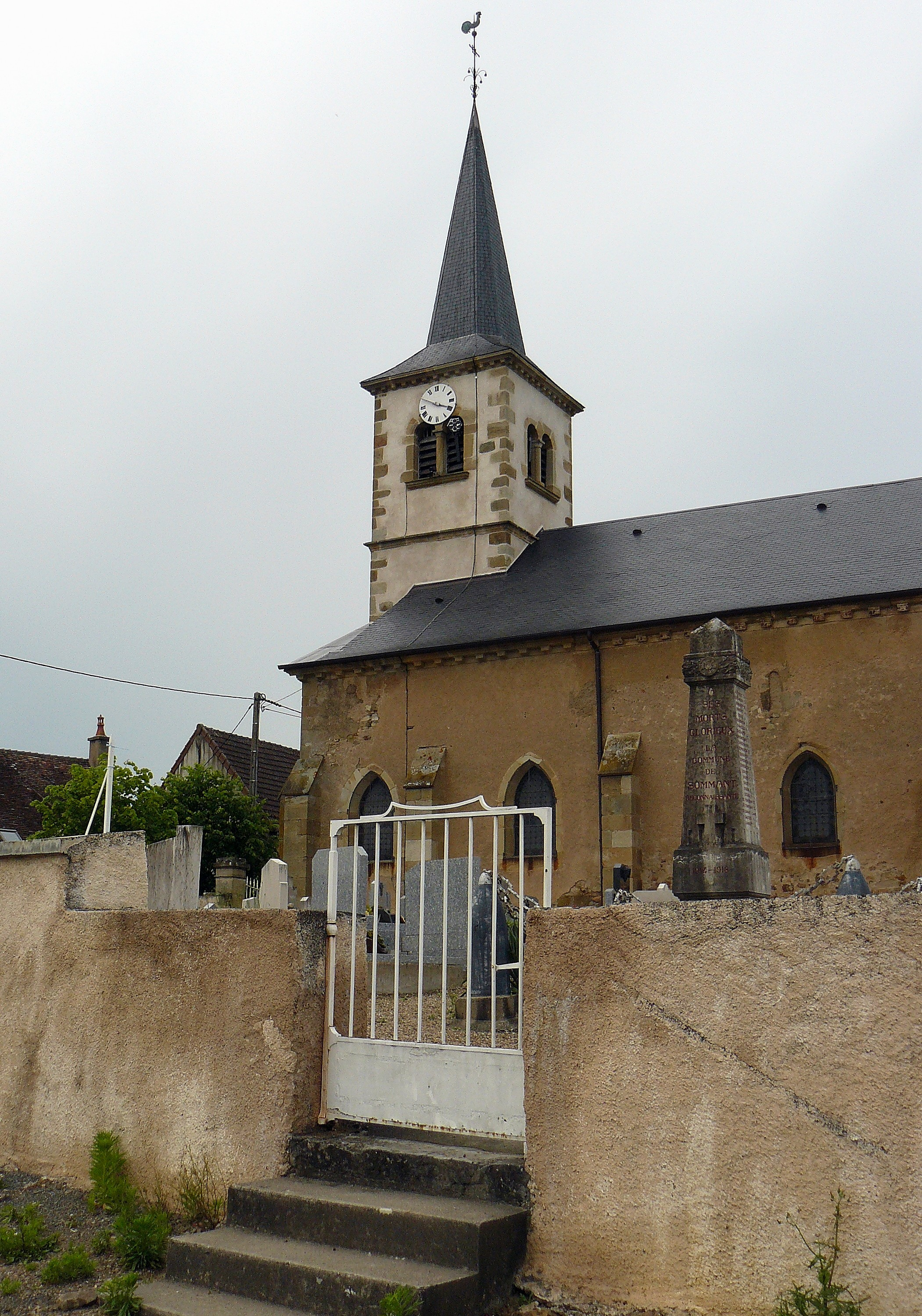
- The church in Sommant
- Location of Sommant
- Location within France Location within Bourgogne-Franche-Comté
- Coordinates: 47°03′00″N 4°13′02″E
- Country: France
- Region: Bourgogne-Franche-Comté
- Department: Saône-et-Loire
- Arrondissement: Autun
- Canton: Autun-1
- Area^{1}: 20.57 km^{2} (7.94 sq mi)
- Elevation: 300 m (980 ft)
- Highest elevation: 654 m (2,146 ft)
- Lowest elevation: 319 m (1,047 ft)
- Population (2023): 184
  - Density: 8.95/km^{2} (23.2/sq mi)
- Time zone: UTC+01:00 (CET)
  - Summer (DST): UTC+02:00 (CEST)
- INSEE/Postal code: 71527 /71540
- ^{1} French Land Register data, which excludes lakes, ponds, glaciers > 1 km^{2} (0.386 sq mi or 247 acres) and river estuaries.

Sommant (French pronunciation: [sɔmɑ̃]) is a commune in the Saône-et-Loire department in the region of Bourgogne-Franche-Comté in eastern France.

== See also ==
- Communes of the Saône-et-Loire department
- Parc naturel régional du Morvan
