= Saint-Léger-du-Bois =

- Commune
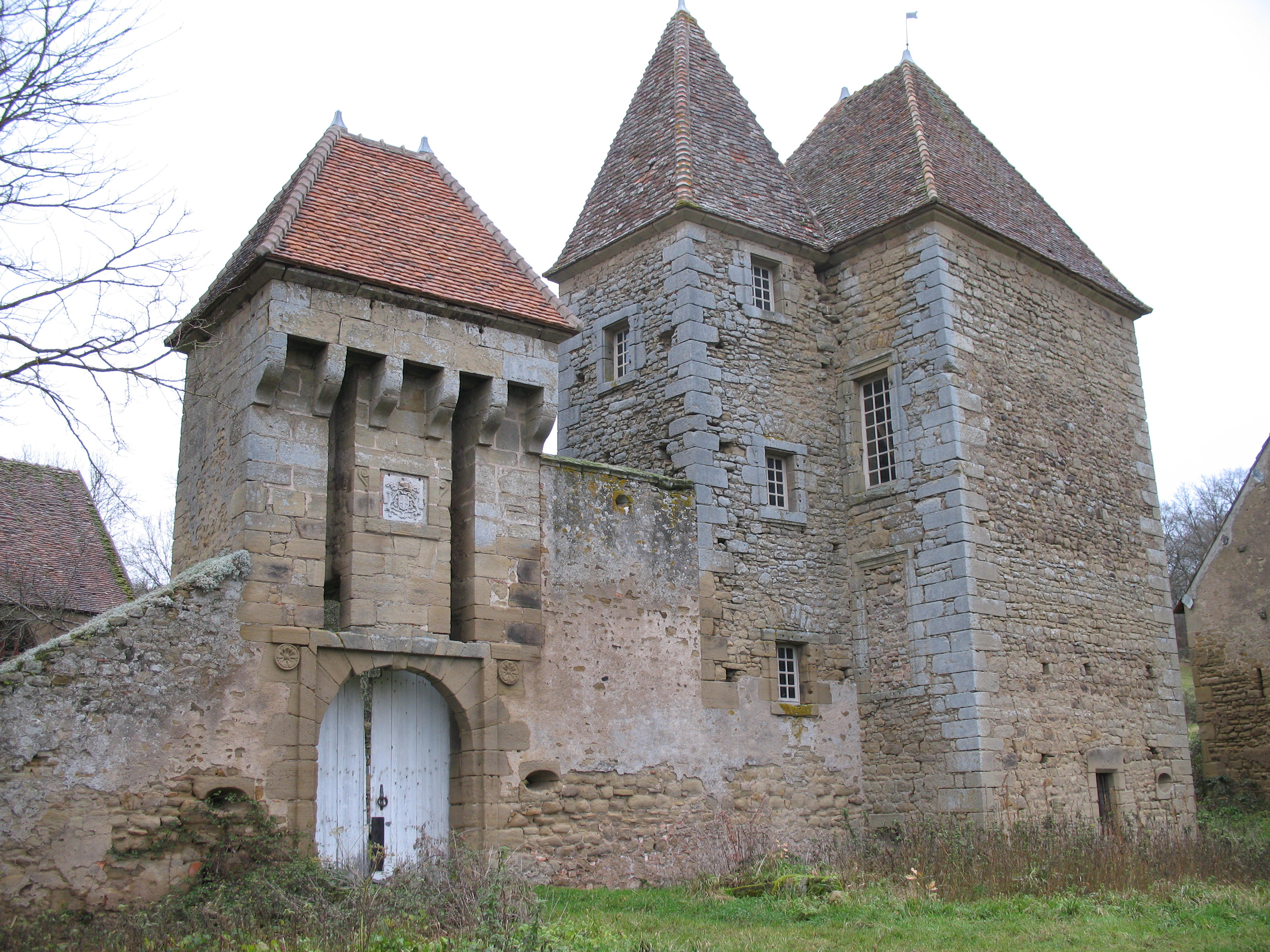
- Chateau of Champsigny
- Location of Saint-Léger-du-Bois
- Location within France Location within Bourgogne-Franche-Comté
- Coordinates: 47°01′02″N 4°26′53″E
- Country: France
- Region: Bourgogne-Franche-Comté
- Department: Saône-et-Loire
- Arrondissement: Autun
- Canton: Autun-1
- Area^{1}: 21.26 km^{2} (8.21 sq mi)
- Elevation: 316 m (1,037 ft)
- Highest elevation: 413 m (1,355 ft)
- Lowest elevation: 299 m (981 ft)
- Population (2023): 505
  - Density: 23.8/km^{2} (61.5/sq mi)
- Time zone: UTC+01:00 (CET)
  - Summer (DST): UTC+02:00 (CEST)
- INSEE/Postal code: 71438 /71360
- ^{1} French Land Register data, which excludes lakes, ponds, glaciers > 1 km^{2} (0.386 sq mi or 247 acres) and river estuaries.

Saint-Léger-du-Bois (French pronunciation: [sɛ̃ leʒe dy bwa]) is a commune in the Saône-et-Loire department in the region of Bourgogne-Franche-Comté in eastern France.

== See also ==
- Communes of the Saône-et-Loire department
