= Reclesne =

- Commune
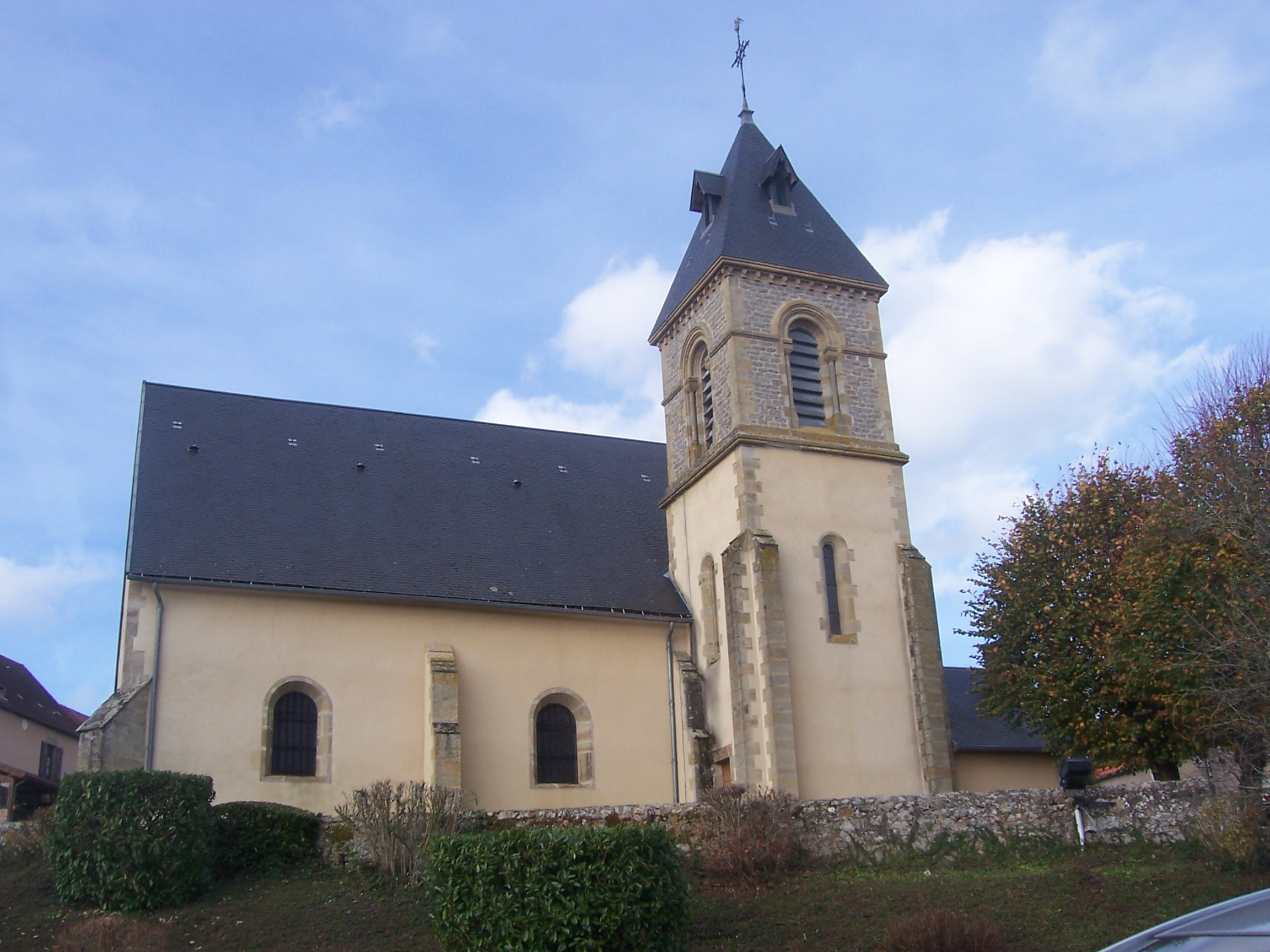
- The church in Reclesne
- Location of Reclesne
- Location within France Location within Bourgogne-Franche-Comté
- Coordinates: 47°02′30″N 4°16′16″E
- Country: France
- Region: Bourgogne-Franche-Comté
- Department: Saône-et-Loire
- Arrondissement: Autun
- Canton: Autun-1
- Area^{1}: 20.83 km^{2} (8.04 sq mi)
- Elevation: 480 m (1,570 ft)
- Highest elevation: 545 m (1,788 ft)
- Lowest elevation: 299 m (981 ft)
- Population (2023): 289
  - Density: 13.9/km^{2} (35.9/sq mi)
- Time zone: UTC+01:00 (CET)
  - Summer (DST): UTC+02:00 (CEST)
- INSEE/Postal code: 71368 /71540
- ^{1} French Land Register data, which excludes lakes, ponds, glaciers > 1 km^{2} (0.386 sq mi or 247 acres) and river estuaries.

Reclesne is a commune in the Saône-et-Loire department in the region of Bourgogne-Franche-Comté in eastern France. It is located northwest of Autun.

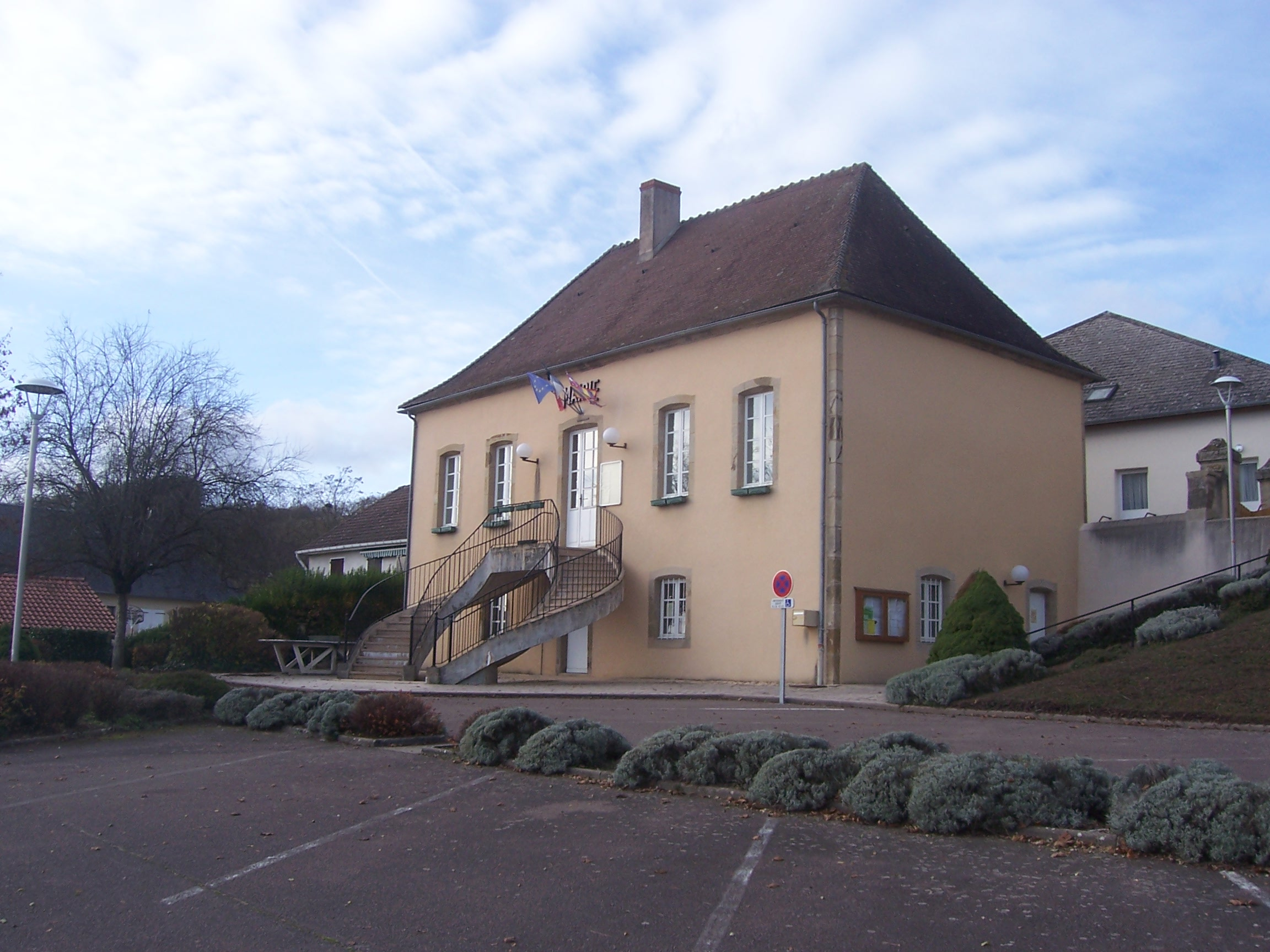
Town hall

== See also ==
- Communes of the Saône-et-Loire department
