= La Petite-Verrière =

- Commune
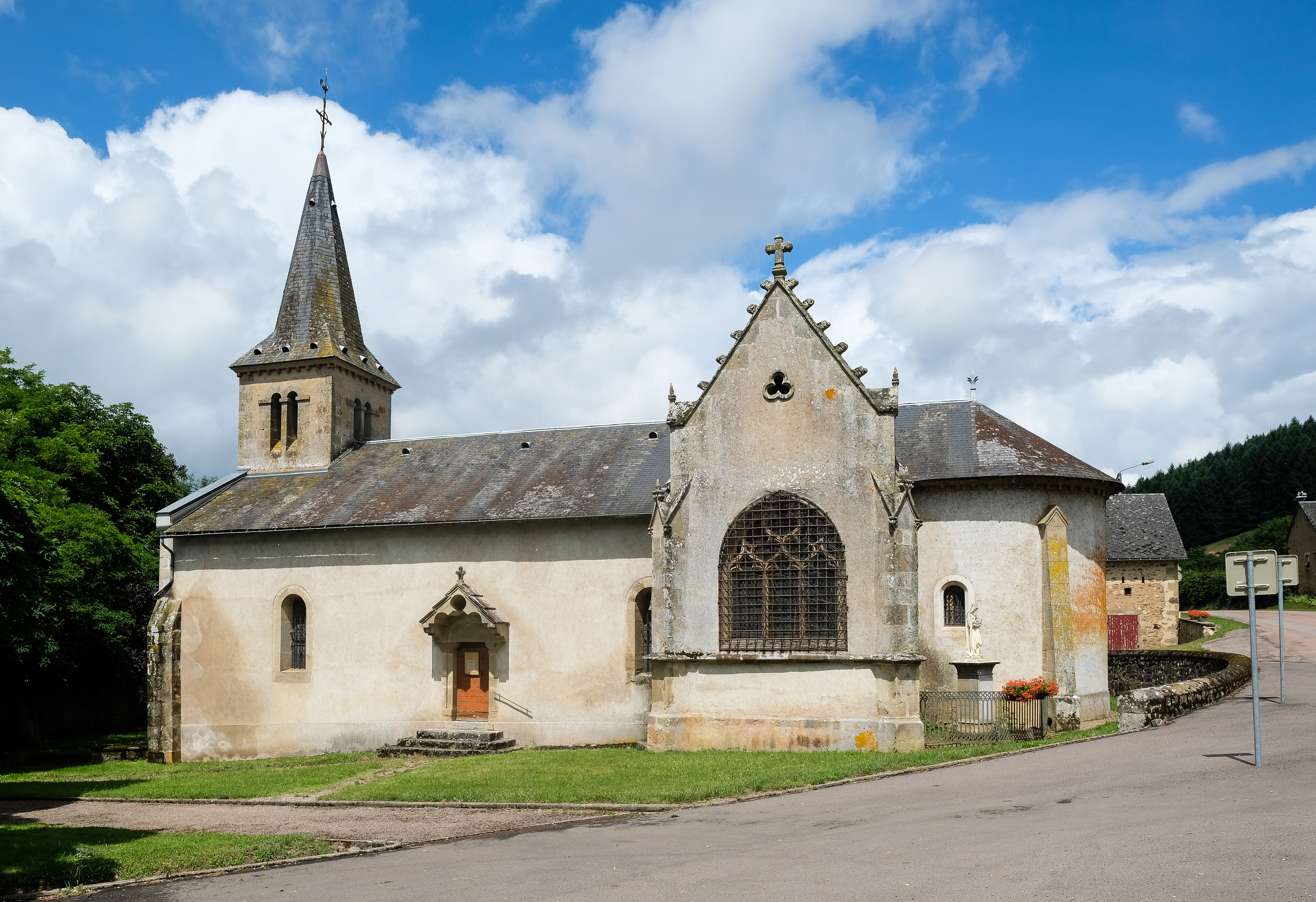
- The church in La Petite-Verrière
- Location of La Petite-Verrière
- Location within France Location within Bourgogne-Franche-Comté
- Coordinates: 47°03′00″N 4°09′39″E
- Country: France
- Region: Bourgogne-Franche-Comté
- Department: Saône-et-Loire
- Arrondissement: Autun
- Canton: Autun-1

Government
  - Mayor (2022–2026): Augustin De Champeaux
- Area^{1}: 9.88 km^{2} (3.81 sq mi)
- Elevation: 360 m (1,180 ft)
- Highest elevation: 654 m (2,146 ft)
- Lowest elevation: 337 m (1,106 ft)
- Population (2023): 47
  - Density: 4.8/km^{2} (12/sq mi)
- Time zone: UTC+01:00 (CET)
  - Summer (DST): UTC+02:00 (CEST)
- INSEE/Postal code: 71349 /71400
- ^{1} French Land Register data, which excludes lakes, ponds, glaciers > 1 km^{2} (0.386 sq mi or 247 acres) and river estuaries.

La Petite-Verrière is a commune in the Saône-et-Loire department in the region of Bourgogne-Franche-Comté in Eastern France. It has a population of 52 (2017).

== See also ==
- Communes of the Saône-et-Loire department
- Parc naturel régional du Morvan
