= Canton of Autun-1 =

Coordinates: 46.96°N 4.30°E

The canton of Autun-1 is an administrative division of the Saône-et-Loire department, eastern France. It was created at the French canton reorganisation which came into effect in March 2015. Its seat is in Autun.

It consists of the following communes:

1. Anost
2. Autun (partly)
3. Barnay
4. La Celle-en-Morvan
5. Chissey-en-Morvan
6. Collonge-la-Madeleine
7. Cordesse
8. Créot
9. Curgy
10. Cussy-en-Morvan
11. Dracy-Saint-Loup
12. Épertully
13. Épinac
14. Igornay
15. Lucenay-l'Évêque
16. Monthelon
17. Morlet
18. La Petite-Verrière
19. Reclesne
20. Roussillon-en-Morvan
21. Saint-Forgeot
22. Saint-Gervais-sur-Couches
23. Saint-Léger-du-Bois
24. Saisy
25. Sommant
26. Sully
27. Tavernay
28. Tintry
