= Barnay =

- Commune
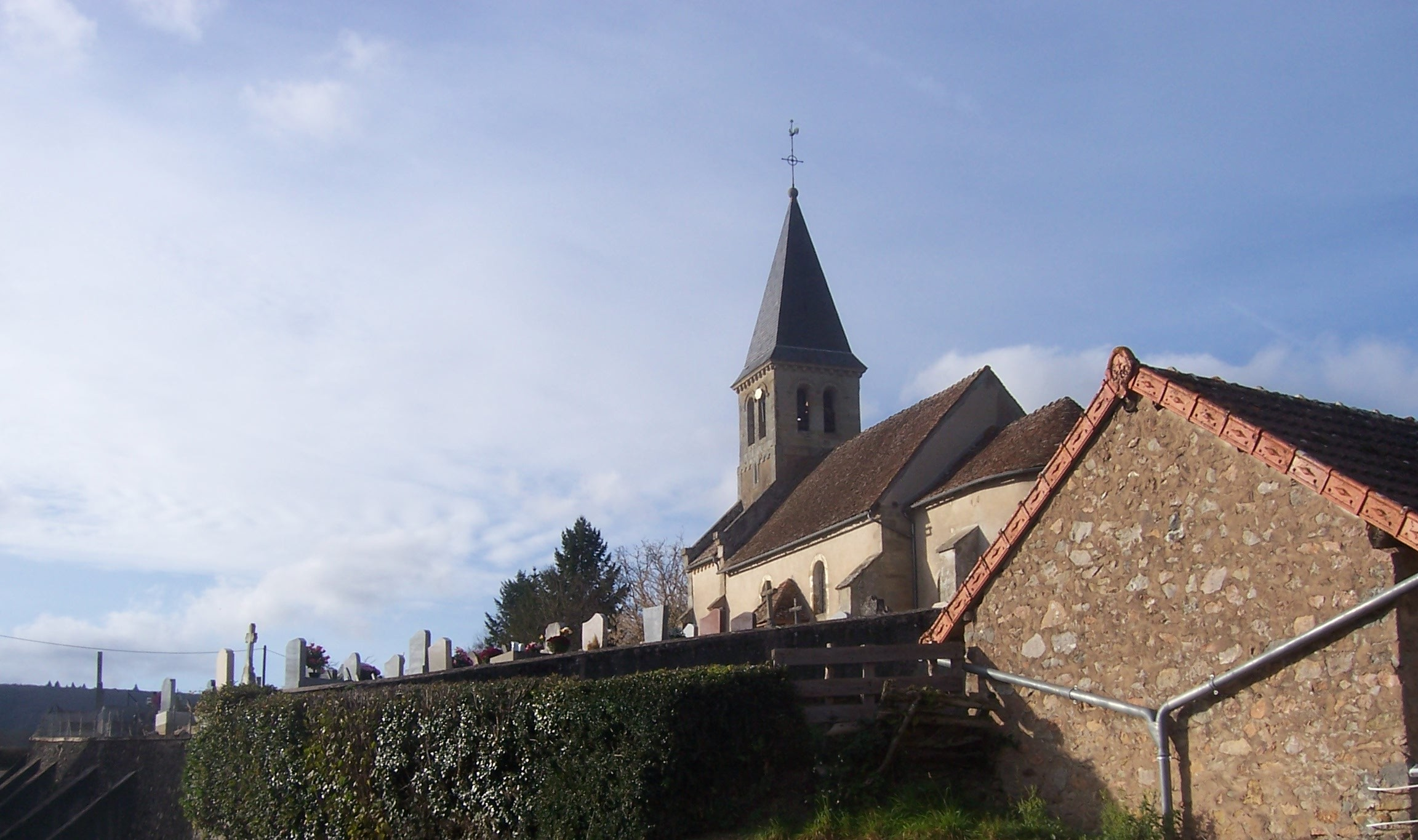
- Location of Barnay
- Location within France Location within Bourgogne-Franche-Comté
- Coordinates: 47°05′19″N 4°20′21″E
- Country: France
- Region: Bourgogne-Franche-Comté
- Department: Saône-et-Loire
- Arrondissement: Autun
- Canton: Autun-1
- Intercommunality: Grand Autunois Morvan

Government
  - Mayor (2020–2026): Jacqueline Genty
- Area^{1}: 15.4 km^{2} (5.9 sq mi)
- Elevation: 346 m (1,135 ft)
- Highest elevation: 565 m (1,854 ft)
- Lowest elevation: 317 m (1,040 ft)
- Population (2023): 99
  - Density: 6.4/km^{2} (17/sq mi)
- Time zone: UTC+01:00 (CET)
  - Summer (DST): UTC+02:00 (CEST)
- INSEE/Postal code: 71020 /71540
- ^{1} French Land Register data, which excludes lakes, ponds, glaciers > 1 km^{2} (0.386 sq mi or 247 acres) and river estuaries.

Barnay (French pronunciation: [baʁnɛ]) is a commune in the Saône-et-Loire department in the region of Bourgogne-Franche-Comté in eastern France. It is located north of Autun, close to the border of Côte-d'Or.

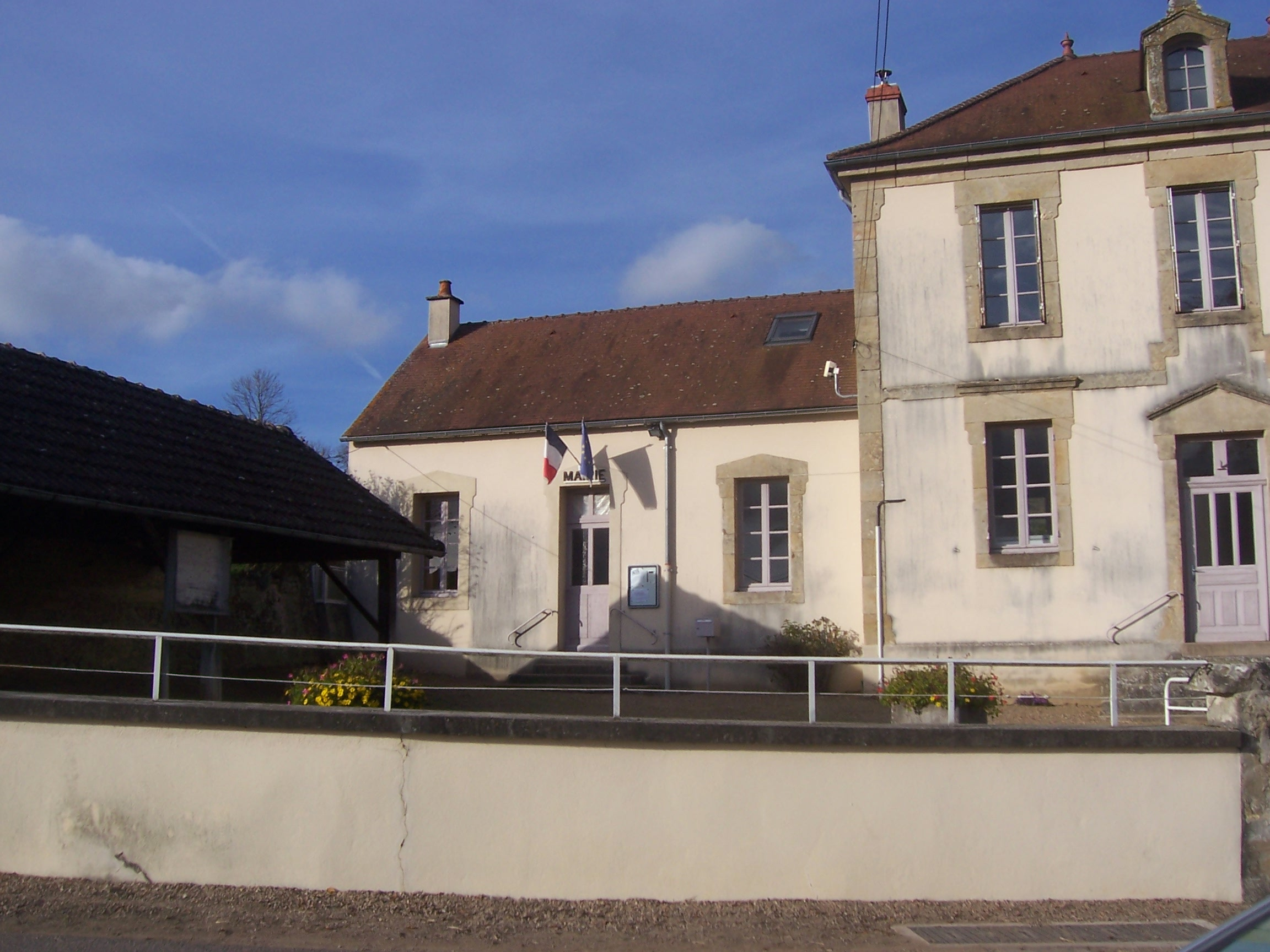
Town hall

== Population ==
Historical population
Year	Pop.	±% p.a.
1968	169	—
1975	155	−1.23%
1982	124	−3.14%
1990	126	+0.20%
1999	114	−1.11%
2007	102	−1.38%
2012	118	+2.96%
2017	100	−3.26%
2023	99	−0.17%
Source: INSEE

== See also ==
- Communes of the Saône-et-Loire department
