= Collonge-la-Madeleine =

- Commune
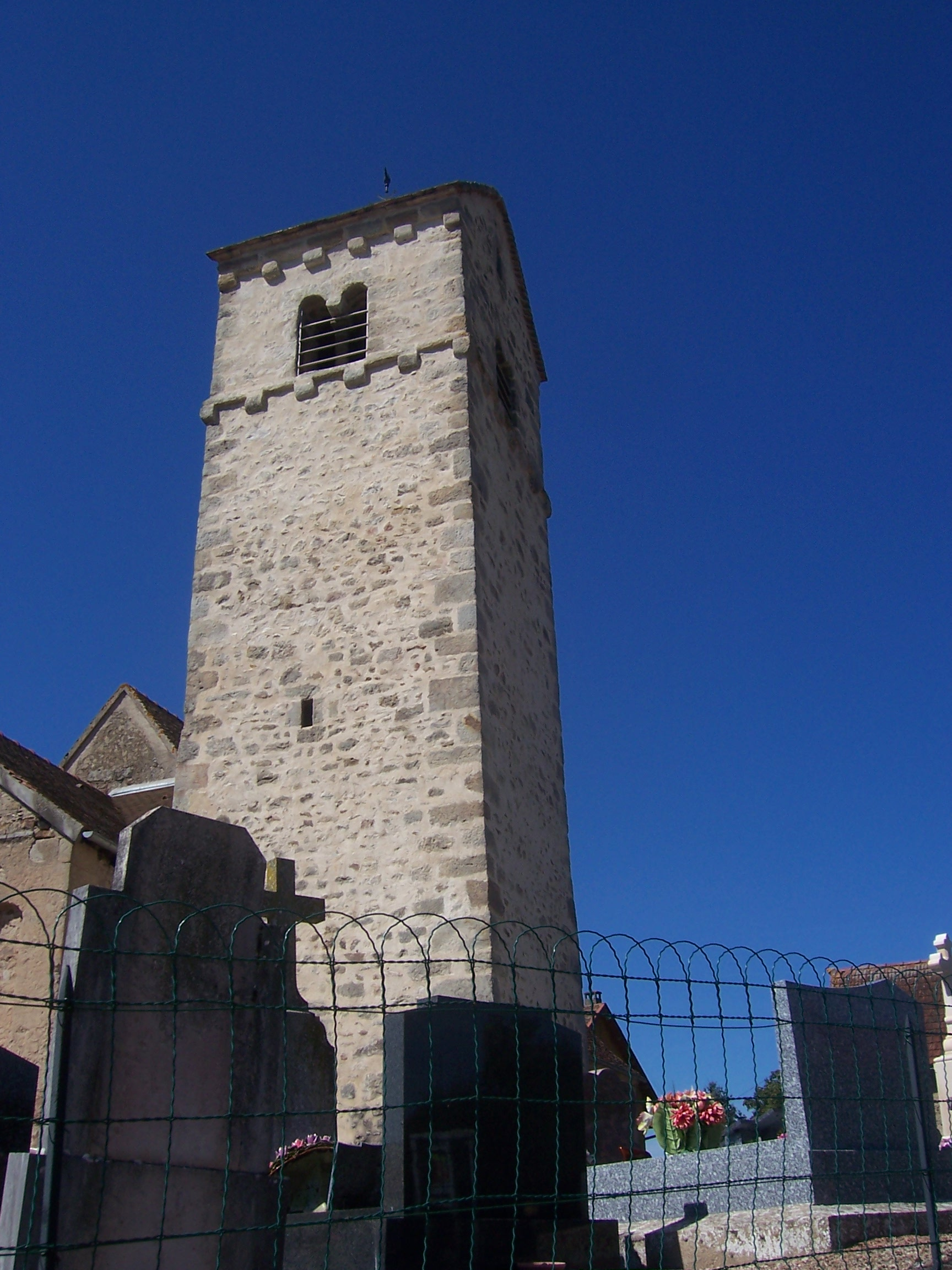
- The church in Collonge-la-Madeleine
- Location of Collonge-la-Madeleine
- Location within France Location within Bourgogne-Franche-Comté
- Coordinates: 46°56′28″N 4°31′22″E
- Country: France
- Region: Bourgogne-Franche-Comté
- Department: Saône-et-Loire
- Arrondissement: Autun
- Canton: Autun-1
- Area^{1}: 5.29 km^{2} (2.04 sq mi)
- Elevation: 419 m (1,375 ft)
- Highest elevation: 457 m (1,499 ft)
- Lowest elevation: 360 m (1,180 ft)
- Population (2023): 38
  - Density: 7.2/km^{2} (19/sq mi)
- Time zone: UTC+01:00 (CET)
  - Summer (DST): UTC+02:00 (CEST)
- INSEE/Postal code: 71140 /71360
- ^{1} French Land Register data, which excludes lakes, ponds, glaciers > 1 km^{2} (0.386 sq mi or 247 acres) and river estuaries.

Collonge-la-Madeleine (French pronunciation: [kɔlɔ̃ʒ la madlɛn]) is a commune in the Saône-et-Loire department in the region of Bourgogne-Franche-Comté in eastern France.

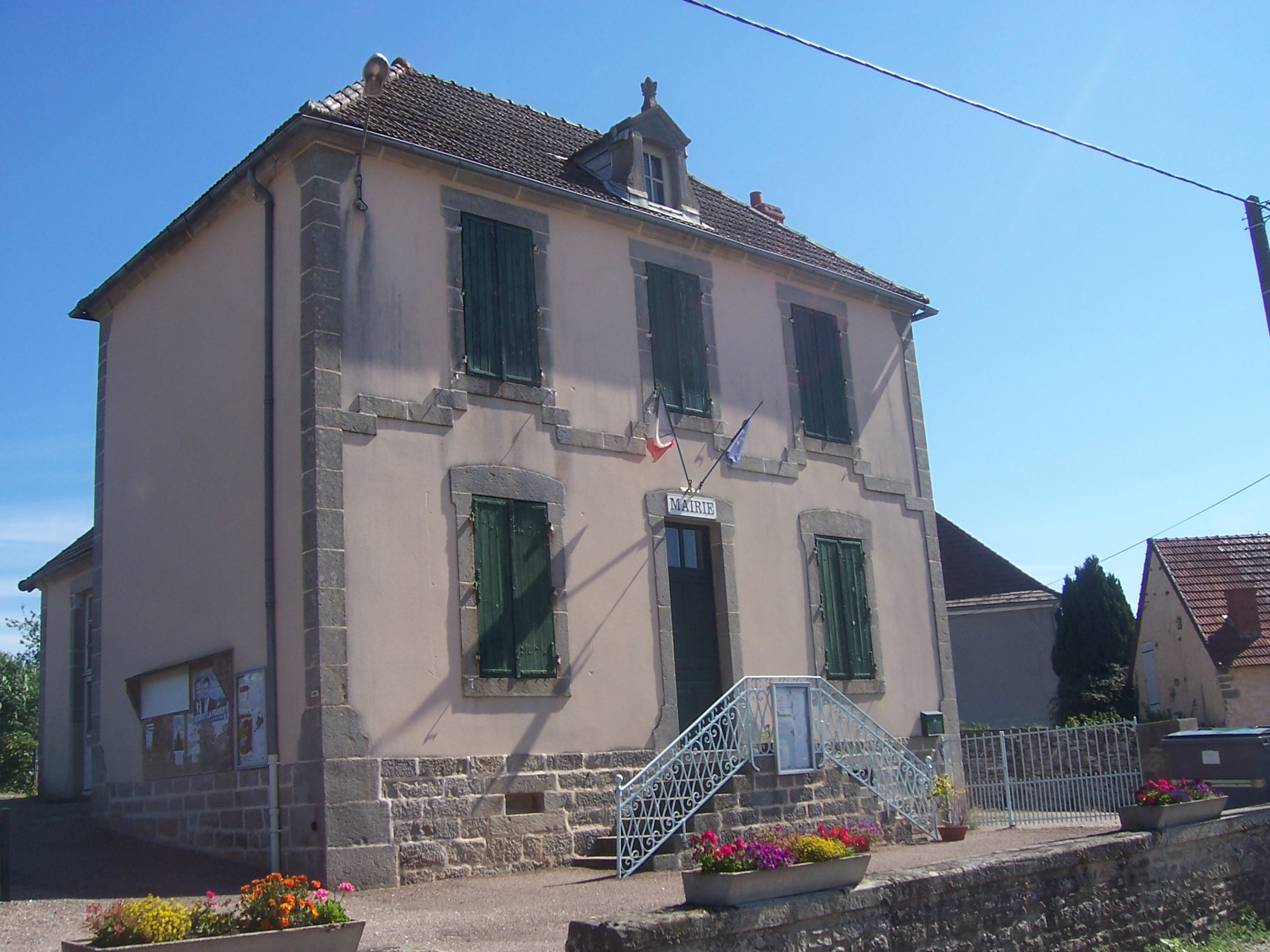
Town hall

== See also ==
- Communes of the Saône-et-Loire department
