= Auxey-Duresses =

- Commune
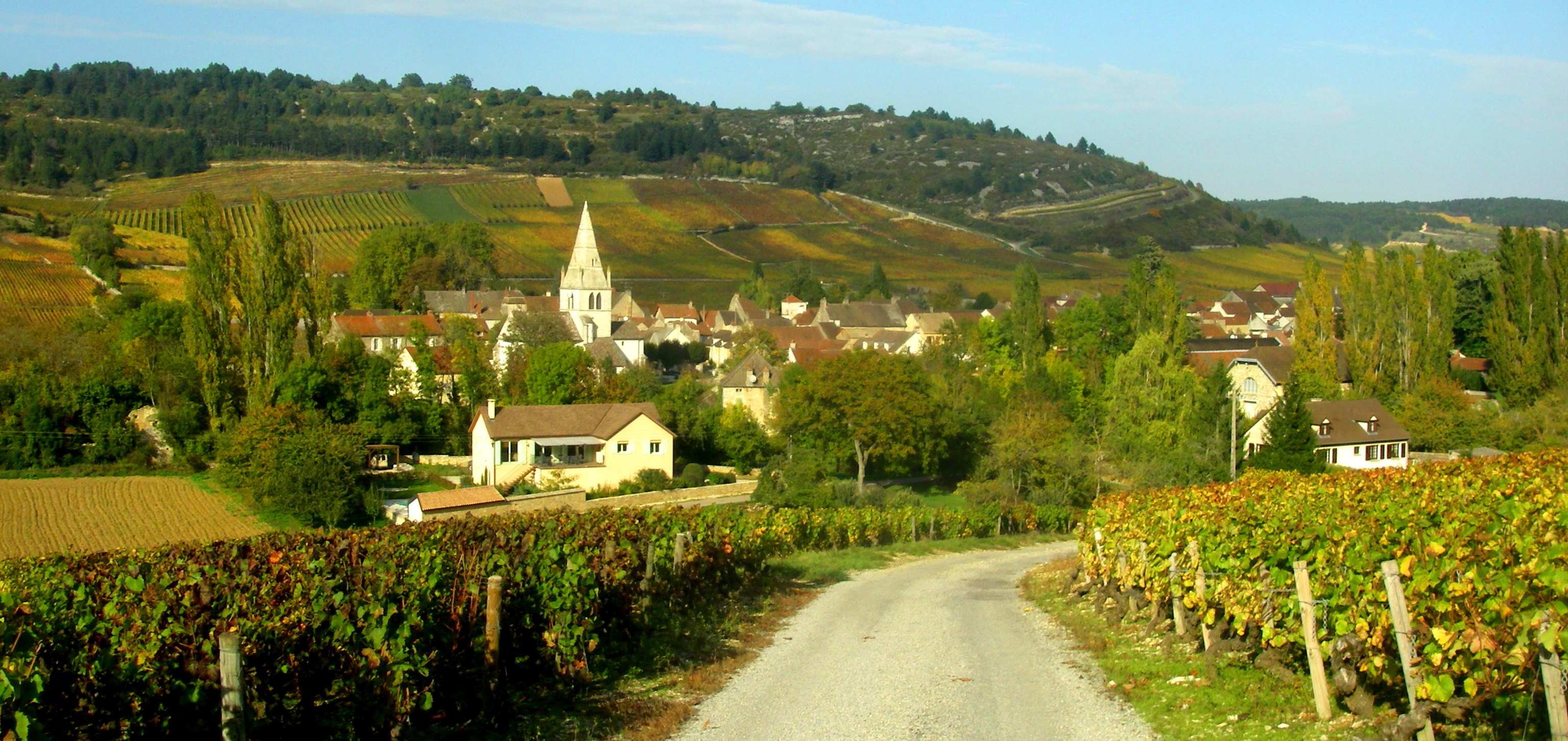
- A general view of Auxey-Duresses

- Coat of arms
- Location of Auxey-Duresses
- Location within France Location within Bourgogne-Franche-Comté
- Coordinates: 46°59′15″N 4°44′56″E
- Country: France
- Region: Bourgogne-Franche-Comté
- Department: Côte-d'Or
- Arrondissement: Beaune
- Canton: Ladoix-Serrigny
- Intercommunality: CA Beaune Côte et Sud

Government
  - Mayor (2022–2026): François Latour
- Area^{1}: 11.09 km^{2} (4.28 sq mi)
- Elevation: 220 m (720 ft)
- Highest elevation: 482 m (1,581 ft)
- Lowest elevation: 245 m (804 ft)
- Population (2023): 290
  - Density: 26/km^{2} (68/sq mi)
- Time zone: UTC+01:00 (CET)
  - Summer (DST): UTC+02:00 (CEST)
- INSEE/Postal code: 21037 /21190
- ^{1} French Land Register data, which excludes lakes, ponds, glaciers > 1 km^{2} (0.386 sq mi or 247 acres) and river estuaries.

Auxey-Duresses (French pronunciation: [osɛ dyʁɛs]) is a commune in the Côte-d'Or department in the Bourgogne-Franche-Comté region of eastern France.

== Geography ==
Auxey-Duresses is a wine-growing commune some 10 km south-west of Beaune and 11 km north of Chagny. Access to the commune is by the D973 road from Pommard in the north-east which passes through the length of the commune and the village and continues south-west to La Rochepot. The D17E comes from Saint-Romain in the west and passes through the village continuing east to Meursault. Apart from the village there are the hamlets of Melin in the south-west and Petit-Auxey west of the village. The north and south of the commune are rugged and heavily forested with the valley in the centre and west farmland.

The Ruisseau des Cloux flows from the south-west through the centre of the commune from west to east where it continues to join the river Dheune near Merceuil.

== History ==
The Auxey valley was one of the first places where grapevines were planted in Burgundy during the 2nd century BC. when Auxey-le-Petit, which was dependent on Auxey-Duresses, was a high place of Druid worship. On Mount Mélian the remains of a large prehistoric enclosure can be found which was at that time occupied by the Gauls and the Romans. During the Gallo-Roman period the town grew and became known by the Latin name Alcius.

After the barbarian invasions of the 5th century AD the commune reached new heights thanks to the monks of the Abbey of Saint-Symphorien at Autun who built a church at Auxey-le-Petit in 696. It was rebuilt in the 10th century by monks from the Cluny Abbey and it had a large vineyard in the village. The bell tower and the gate are Romanesque and date from the 12th century. These monks also left the "Moines Mill". At that time there were many mills in the valley and the hamlet of Melin, another dependency of the commune, inherited the name.

At the site of the medieval castle there is now the Church of Saint-Martin-Duresses Auxey whose steeple is made from Tuff. Inside there are some paintings, including a triptych relating the life of Mary. The present chateau belonged to the Marquis de MacMahon, one of whose descendants became Marshal of France and Duke of Magenta.

=== Heraldry ===
Arms of Auxey-Duresses	Blazon: Party per pale of Or and Gules, over all a chevron inverted of Vert debruised by a billhook Argent handled in Sable in pale.

== Administration ==
List of Successive Mayors

Mayors from the French Revolution to 1934

From	To	Name
1790	1791	René Latour
1791	1811	Claude Delaplanche
1800	1802	Pierre Rouiller
1811	1816	Claude Fleurot
1816	1818	Brunet de la Serve
1819	1821	Flis Humbert
1821	1830	Brunet de la Serve
1831	1832	Mercier
1832	1834	Pierre Fleurot Marot
1834	1837	Louis Garnier
1837	1840	Pierre Roullier
1840	1844	Philbert Garnier Boillot
1844	1847	Claude Fleurot Battault
1847	1852	Claude Delaplanche Titard
1852	1854	Claude Fleurot Battault
1854	1865	Claude Delaplanche Titard
1865	1870	Rolland Meuriot
1870	1871	Hippolyte Veau
1871	1892	Claude Fleuront Malaquin
1892	1903	Jean-Baptiste Garnier Veau
1903	1919	Claude Matin Battault
1919	1934	Armand Veau

Mayors from 1934

From	To	Name
1934	1945	François Lafouge
1945	1977	Robert Creusefond
1977	1995	Jean Lafouge
1995	2008	Dominique Boire
2008	2014	Agnès Diconne
2014	2022	Bernard Battault
2022	2026	François Latour

== Demography ==
The inhabitants of the commune are known as Alcéens or Alcéennes in French.

Historical population

Year	Pop.	±% p.a.
1793	684	—
1821	856	+0.80%
1846	834	−0.10%
1872	801	−0.16%
1901	649	−0.72%
1926	431	−1.62%
1946	365	−0.83%
1962	398	+0.54%
1968	407	+0.37%

Year	Pop.	±% p.a.
1975	329	−2.99%
1982	345	+0.68%
1990	351	+0.22%
1999	367	+0.50%
2007	337	−1.06%
2012	326	−0.66%
2017	304	−1.39%
2023	290	−0.78%

Source: EHESS and INSEE

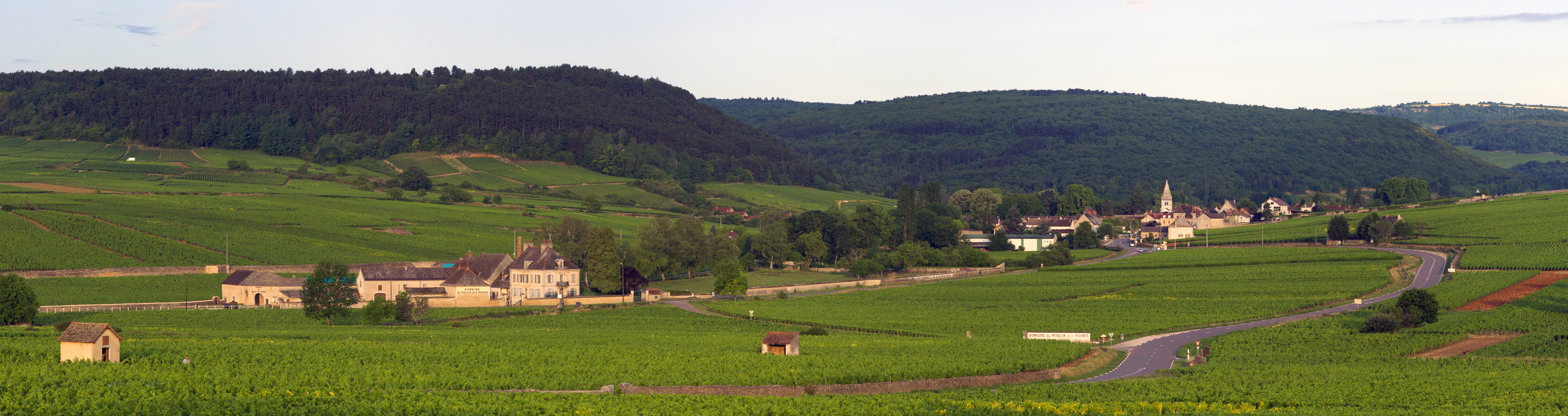
Panorama of the Vineyards

== Wine ==
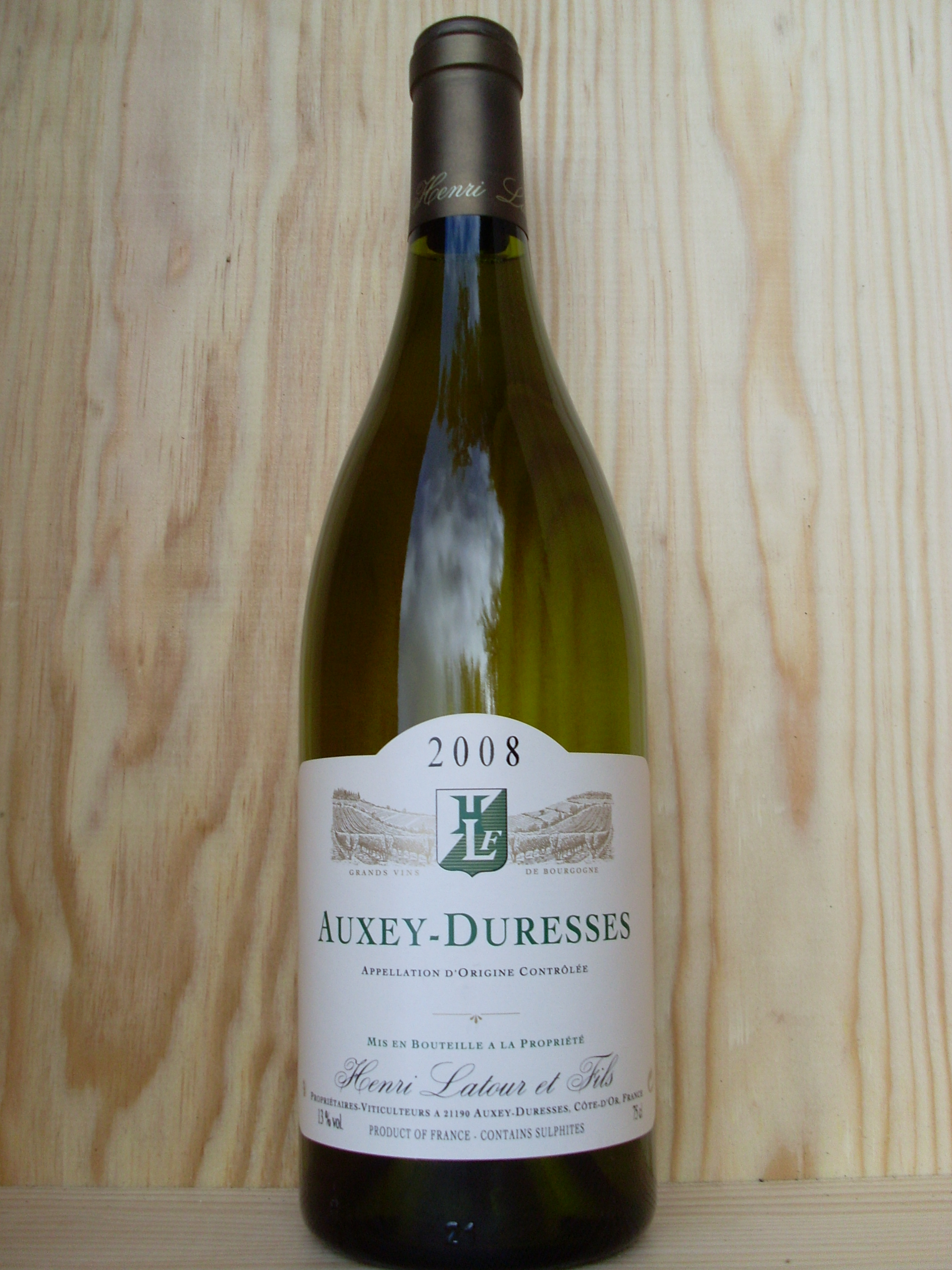
A bottle of Auxey-Duresses wine

Auxey-Duresses is one of the wine communes of the Côte de Beaune with 80 hectares of red wines (including 27 hectares in 1st Vintage) and 35.60 hectares of white wines (including 1.35 hectare in 1st Vintage).

== Culture and heritage ==
=== Civil heritage ===
The commune has a number of buildings and structures that are registered as historical monuments:

- A Lavoir (Public laundry) at Petit-Auxey (19th century)
- A Lavoir (Public laundry) at Meulin (1867)
- A Lavoir (Public laundry) at an unnamed place (19th century)
- A Lavoir (Public laundry) (19th century)

=== Religious heritage ===
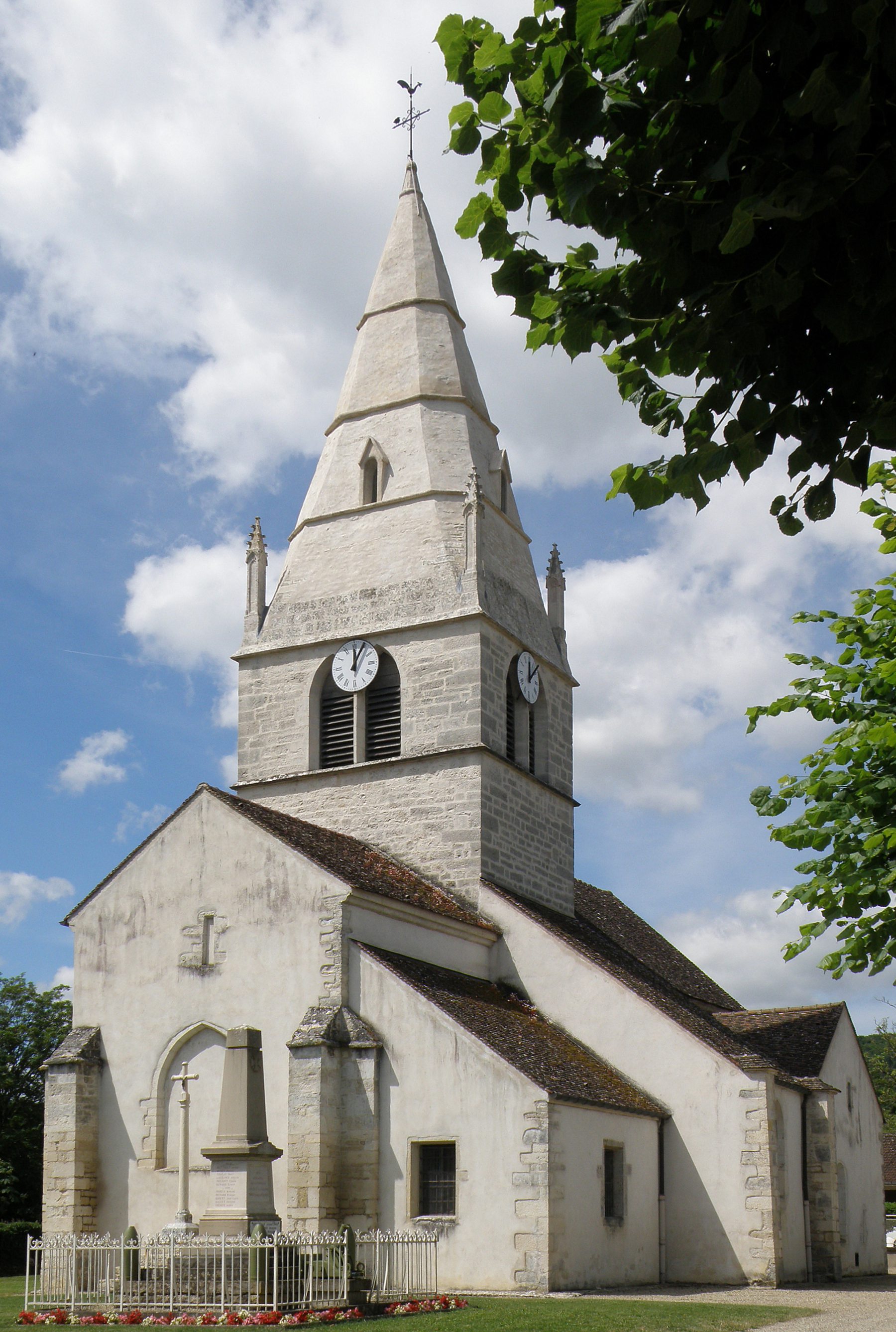
The Church of Saint-Martin

The commune has several religious buildings and structures that are registered as historical monuments:

- The Church of Petit-Auxey (12th century)
- The Church of Saint-Martin (14th century). The Church contains several items that are registered as historical objects:
  - A Painting: Saint Theresa of Avila and Saint John of the Cross (17th century)
  - A Painting: Fainting of Saint Theresa of Avila (17th century)
  - A Painting: Saint Catherine of Sienna (17th century)
  - A Painting: Saint Hyacinthe (17th century)
  - A Painting: The dead Christ (17th century)
  - A Retable (Triptych) depicting the life of the Virgin (16th century)
- A Cemetery Cross
- The Cemetery (15th century)

== See also ==
- French wine
- Communes of the Côte-d'Or department

== Bibliography ==
- Pierre Poupon, Pierre Forgeot, Paul Devaux, and Louis Régis Affre, The Wines of Burgundy, 9th edition, Presses universitaires de France, 1980, 351 pages (in French)
