= Tailly =

Tailly may refer to the following places in France:

- Tailly, Ardennes, a commune in the department of Ardennes
- Tailly, Côte-d'Or, a commune in the department of Côte-d'Or
- Tailly, Somme, a commune in the department of Somme
