= Corpeau =

- Commune
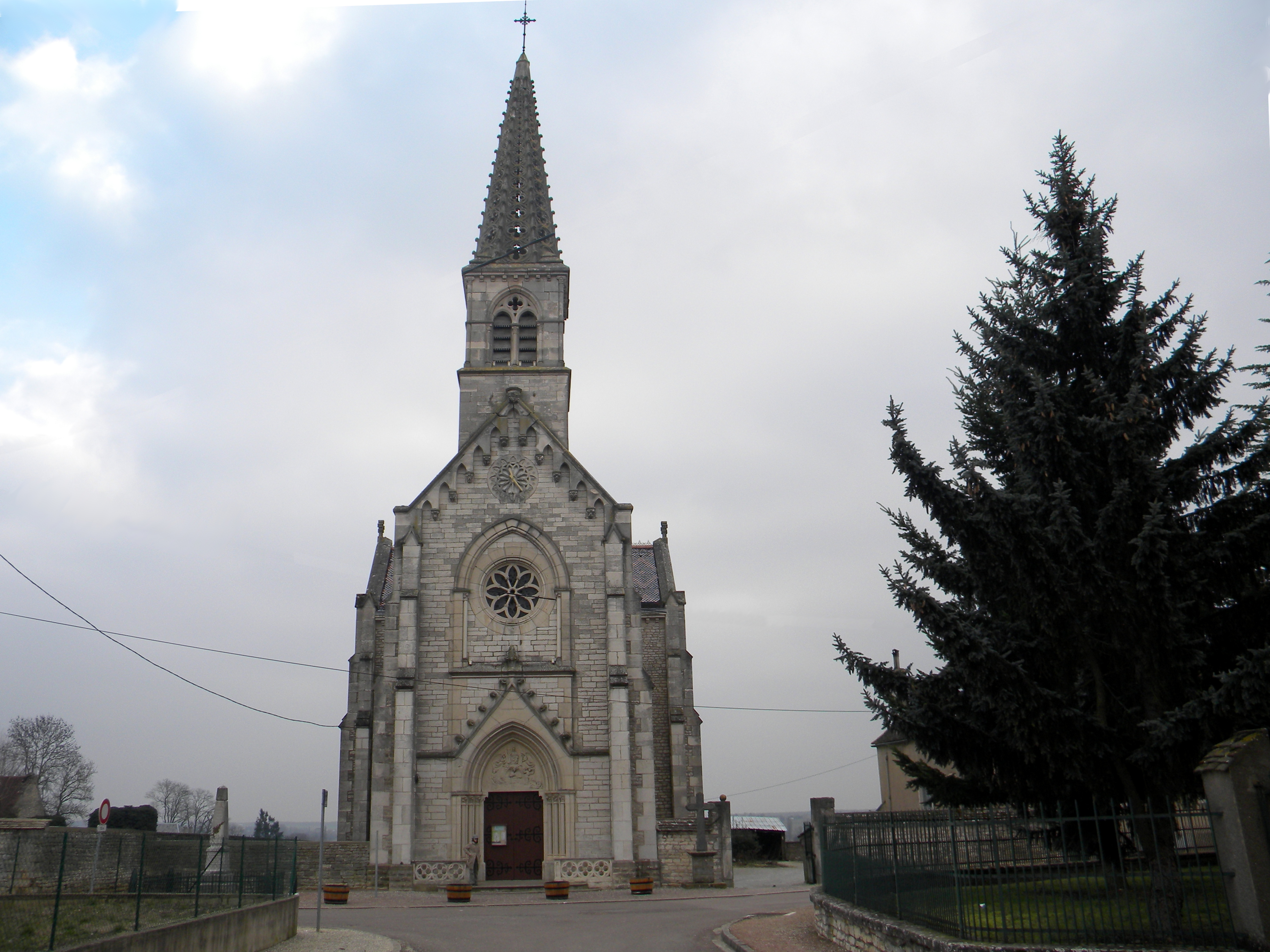
- The church in Corpeau

- Coat of arms
- Location of Corpeau
- Location within France Location within Bourgogne-Franche-Comté
- Coordinates: 46°55′46″N 4°45′09″E
- Country: France
- Region: Bourgogne-Franche-Comté
- Department: Côte-d'Or
- Arrondissement: Beaune
- Canton: Ladoix-Serrigny
- Intercommunality: CA Beaune Côte et Sud

Government
  - Mayor (2020–2026): Sandrine Arrault
- Area^{1}: 4.67 km^{2} (1.80 sq mi)
- Highest elevation: 237 m (778 ft)
- Lowest elevation: 201 m (659 ft)
- Population (2023): 943
  - Density: 202/km^{2} (523/sq mi)
- Time zone: UTC+01:00 (CET)
  - Summer (DST): UTC+02:00 (CEST)
- INSEE/Postal code: 21196 /21190
- ^{1} French Land Register data, which excludes lakes, ponds, glaciers > 1 km^{2} (0.386 sq mi or 247 acres) and river estuaries.

Corpeau (French pronunciation: [kɔʁpo]) is a commune in the Côte-d'Or department in Bourgogne-Franche-Comté, eastern France. Neighboring towns include Puligny Montrachet to the north, Ebaty to the east, Chagny to the south and Chassagne-Montrachet to the west.

== Population ==
Historical population
Year	Pop.	±% p.a.
1968	422	—
1975	466	+1.43%
1982	618	+4.12%
1990	938	+5.35%
1999	1,002	+0.74%
2007	1,037	+0.43%
2012	996	−0.80%
2017	968	−0.57%
2023	943	−0.44%
Source: INSEE

== List of mayors ==
List of successive mayors
Period		Mayor
March 2001	March 2013	Gérard Boula
May 2013	March 2014	Michel Ponelle
March 2014	In progress	Sandrine Arrault
.

== See also ==
- Communes of the Côte-d'Or department
