= Bouillaud =

Bouillaud is a French surname. Notable people with the surname include:

- Charles Bouillaud (1904–1965), French actor
- Jean-Baptiste Bouillaud (1796–1881), French physician
- Jean-Claude Bouillaud (1927–2008), French film and television actor

== See also ==
- Bouilland, a commune in the Côte-d'Or department in eastern France
