= Levernois =

- Commune
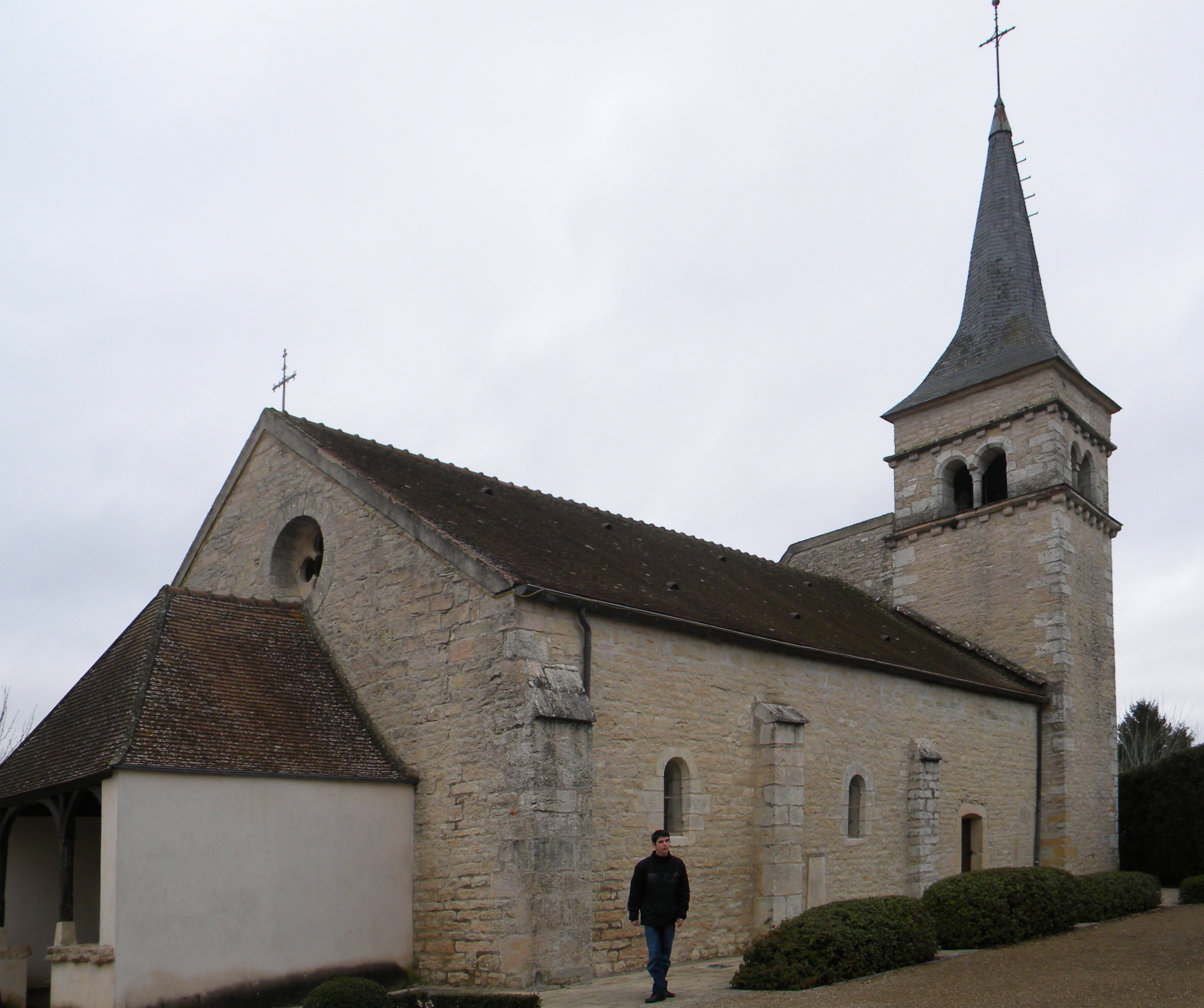
- The church in Levernois

- Coat of arms
- Location of Levernois
- Location within France Location within Bourgogne-Franche-Comté
- Coordinates: 46°59′47″N 4°52′26″E
- Country: France
- Region: Bourgogne-Franche-Comté
- Department: Côte-d'Or
- Arrondissement: Beaune
- Canton: Ladoix-Serrigny
- Intercommunality: CA Beaune Côte et Sud

Government
  - Mayor (2020–2026): Jean-Louis Baudoin
- Area^{1}: 3.73 km^{2} (1.44 sq mi)
- Highest elevation: 211 m (692 ft)
- Lowest elevation: 194 m (636 ft)
- Population (2023): 363
  - Density: 97.3/km^{2} (252/sq mi)
- Time zone: UTC+01:00 (CET)
  - Summer (DST): UTC+02:00 (CEST)
- INSEE/Postal code: 21347 /21200
- ^{1} French Land Register data, which excludes lakes, ponds, glaciers > 1 km^{2} (0.386 sq mi or 247 acres) and river estuaries.

Levernois (French pronunciation: [ləvɛʁnwa]) is a commune in the Côte-d'Or department in eastern France.

== Population ==
Historical population
Year	Pop.	±% p.a.
1968	174	—
1975	198	+1.86%
1982	250	+3.39%
1990	285	+1.65%
1999	260	−1.01%
2007	263	+0.14%
2012	296	+2.39%
2017	327	+2.01%
2023	363	+1.76%
Source: INSEE

== See also ==
- Communes of the Côte-d'Or department
