= Meloisey =

- Commune
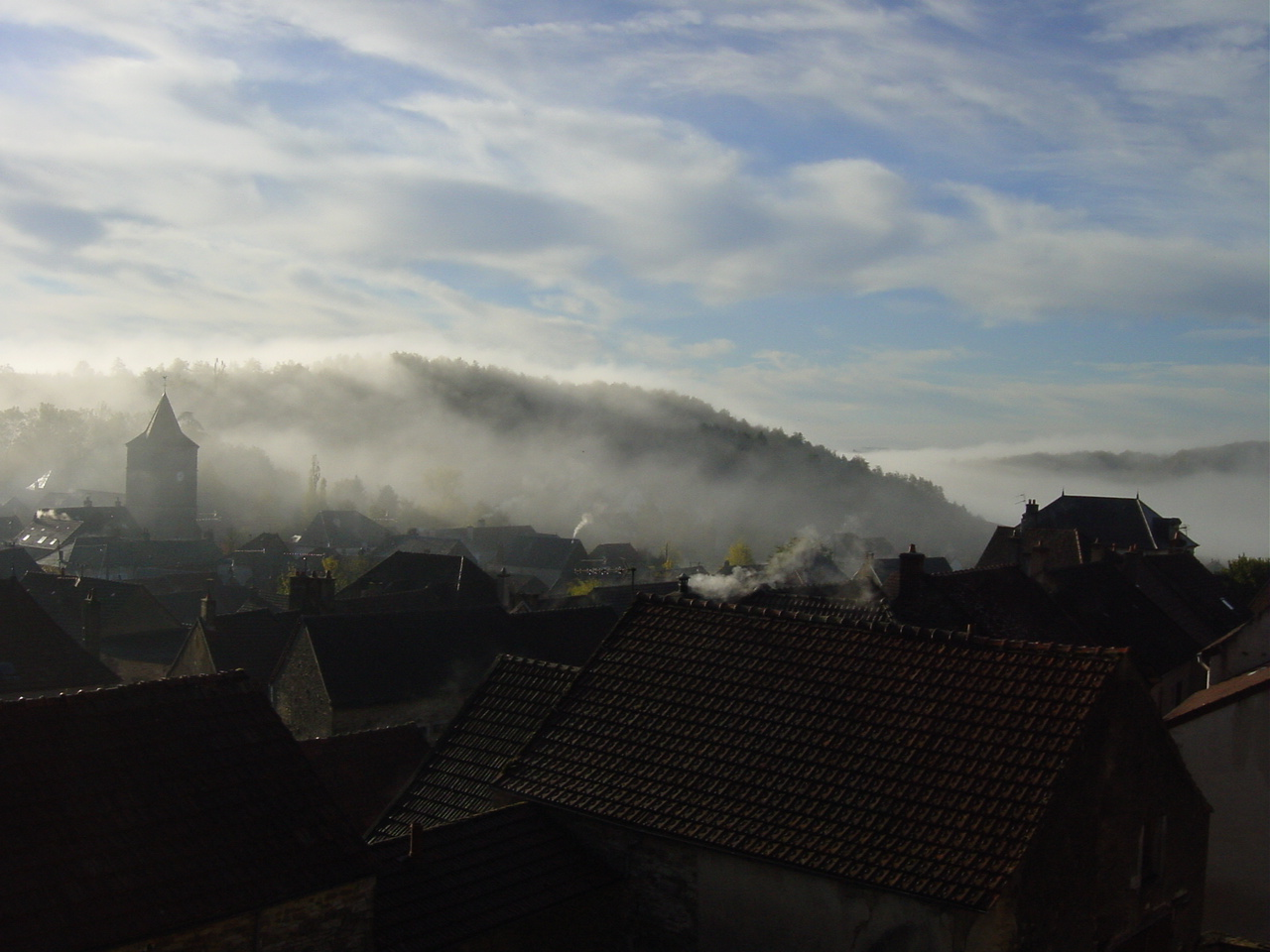
- Meloisey and St. Peters

- Coat of arms
- Location of Meloisey
- Location within France Location within Bourgogne-Franche-Comté
- Coordinates: 47°02′02″N 4°44′09″E
- Country: France
- Region: Bourgogne-Franche-Comté
- Department: Côte-d'Or
- Arrondissement: Beaune
- Canton: Ladoix-Serrigny
- Intercommunality: CA Beaune Côte et Sud

Government
  - Mayor (2020–2026): Pascal Malaquin
- Area^{1}: 12.27 km^{2} (4.74 sq mi)
- Highest elevation: 590 m (1,940 ft)
- Lowest elevation: 281 m (922 ft)
- Population (2023): 321
  - Density: 26.2/km^{2} (67.8/sq mi)
- Time zone: UTC+01:00 (CET)
  - Summer (DST): UTC+02:00 (CEST)
- INSEE/Postal code: 21401 /21190
- ^{1} French Land Register data, which excludes lakes, ponds, glaciers > 1 km^{2} (0.386 sq mi or 247 acres) and river estuaries.

Meloisey (French pronunciation: [məlwazɛ]) is a commune in the Côte-d'Or department in eastern France.

Meloisey is a village of the Hautes Côtes de Beaune wine region, close to Beaune.

== Population ==
Historical population
Year	Pop.	±% p.a.
1968	295	—
1975	271	−1.20%
1982	291	+1.02%
1990	318	+1.12%
1999	303	−0.54%
2007	283	−0.85%
2012	353	+4.52%
2017	326	−1.58%
2023	321	−0.26%
Source: INSEE

== See also ==
- French wine
- Burgundy wine
- Communes of the Côte-d'Or department
