= Monthelie =

- Commune
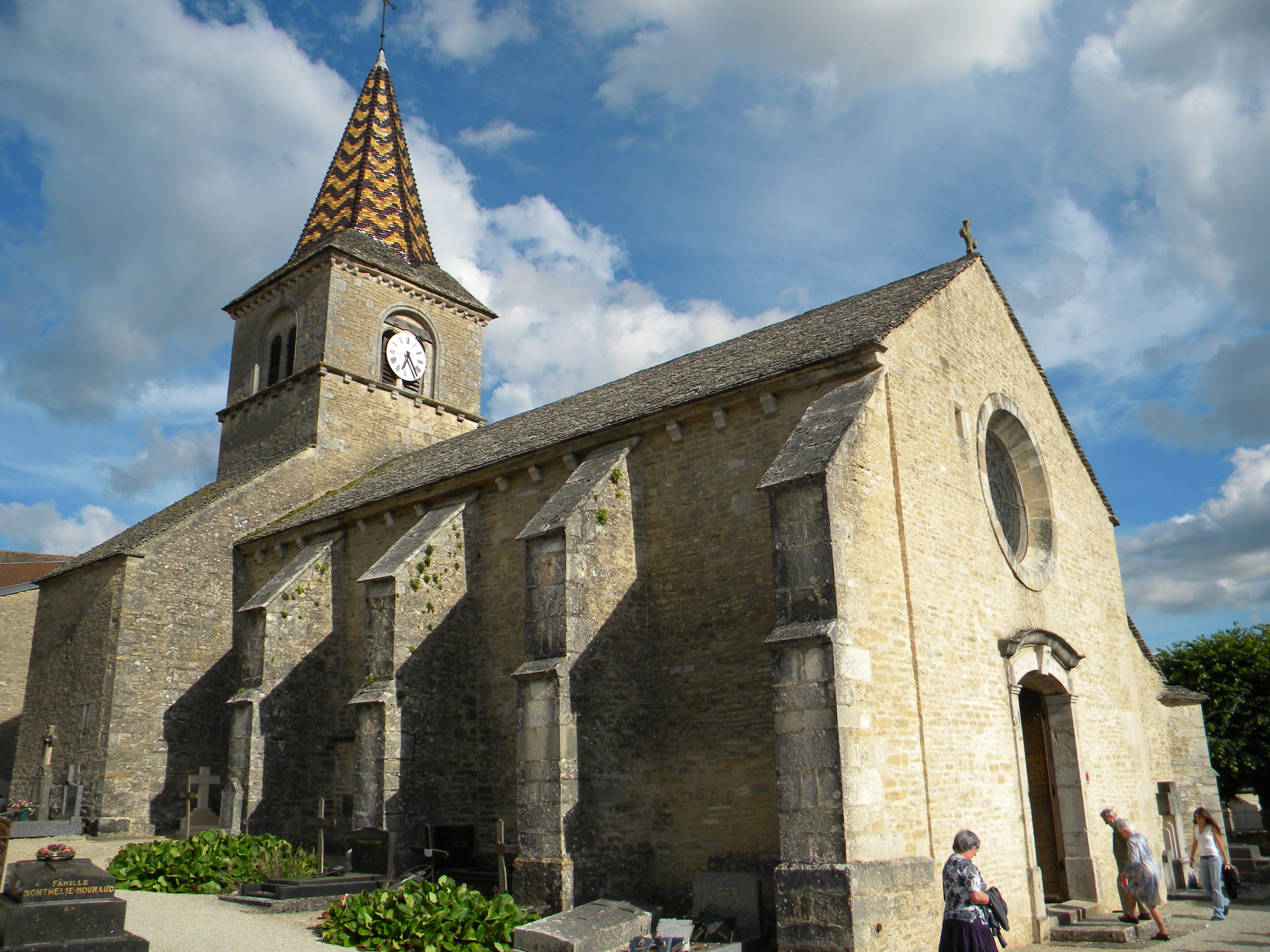
- The church in Monthelie

- Coat of arms
- Location of Monthelie
- Location within France Location within Bourgogne-Franche-Comté
- Coordinates: 46°59′36″N 4°46′03″E
- Country: France
- Region: Bourgogne-Franche-Comté
- Department: Côte-d'Or
- Arrondissement: Beaune
- Canton: Ladoix-Serrigny
- Intercommunality: CA Beaune Côte et Sud

Government
  - Mayor (2020–2026): Cladio Pagnotta
- Area^{1}: 3.14 km^{2} (1.21 sq mi)
- Highest elevation: 386 m (1,266 ft)
- Lowest elevation: 251 m (823 ft)
- Population (2023): 144
  - Density: 45.9/km^{2} (119/sq mi)
- Time zone: UTC+01:00 (CET)
  - Summer (DST): UTC+02:00 (CEST)
- INSEE/Postal code: 21428 /21190
- ^{1} French Land Register data, which excludes lakes, ponds, glaciers > 1 km^{2} (0.386 sq mi or 247 acres) and river estuaries.

Monthelie (French pronunciation: [mɔ̃teli]) is a commune in the Côte-d'Or department in eastern France.

== Population ==
Historical population
Year	Pop.	±% p.a.
1968	220	—
1975	199	−1.42%
1982	198	−0.07%
1990	193	−0.32%
1999	200	+0.40%
2007	176	−1.59%
2012	159	−2.01%
2017	162	+0.37%
2023	144	−1.94%
Source: INSEE

== Wine ==
Monthelie is one of the wine communes of the Côte de Beaune.

== See also ==
- Communes of the Côte-d'Or department
