= Santosse =

- Commune
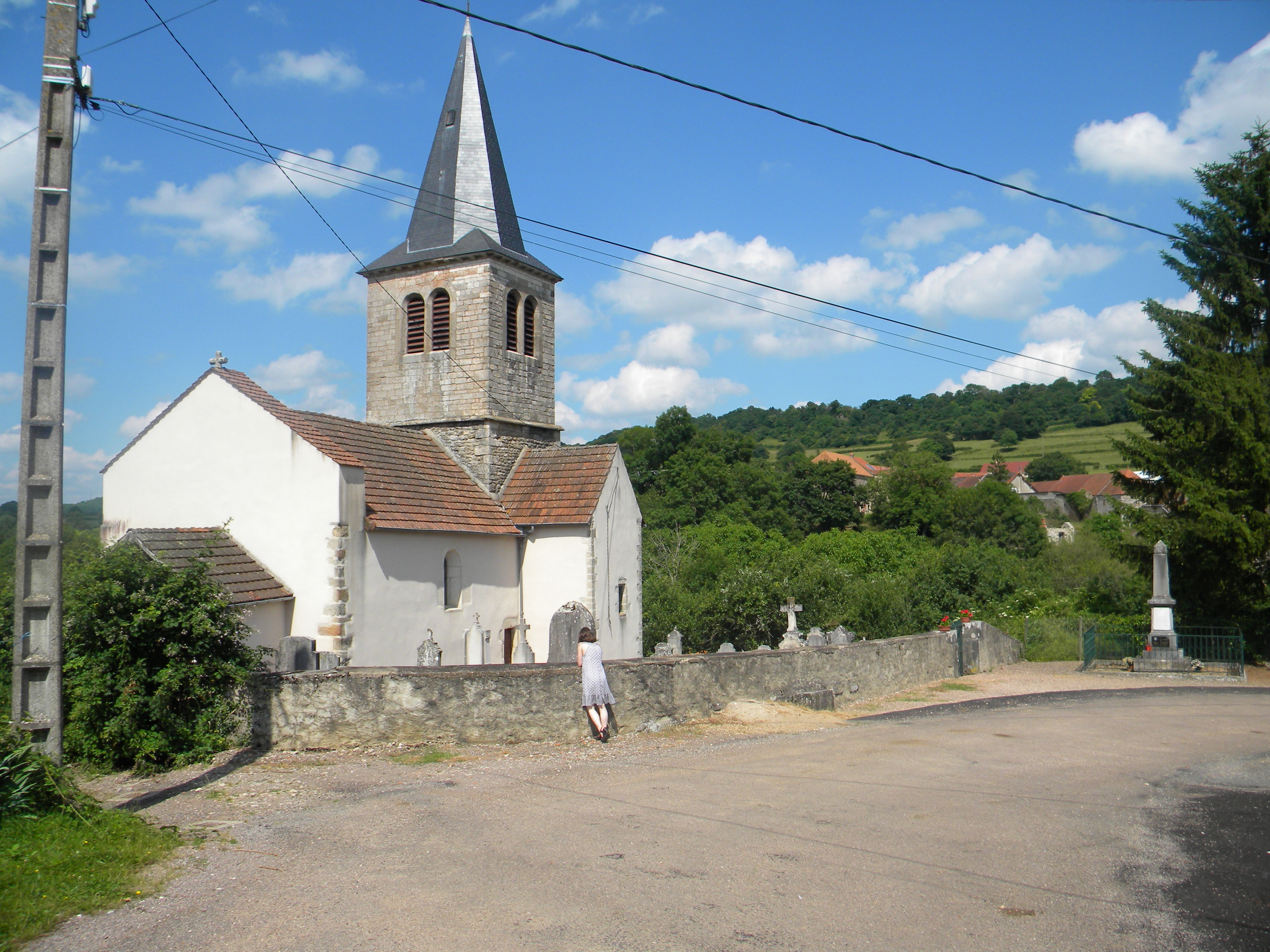
- The church in Santosse
- Location of Santosse
- Location within France Location within Bourgogne-Franche-Comté
- Coordinates: 47°00′22″N 4°37′50″E
- Country: France
- Region: Bourgogne-Franche-Comté
- Department: Côte-d'Or
- Arrondissement: Beaune
- Canton: Arnay-le-Duc
- Intercommunality: CA Beaune Côte et Sud

Government
  - Mayor (2020–2026): Jacqueline Metais
- Area^{1}: 7.93 km^{2} (3.06 sq mi)
- Highest elevation: 567 m (1,860 ft)
- Lowest elevation: 392 m (1,286 ft)
- Population (2023): 61
  - Density: 7.7/km^{2} (20/sq mi)
- Time zone: UTC+01:00 (CET)
  - Summer (DST): UTC+02:00 (CEST)
- INSEE/Postal code: 21583 /21340
- ^{1} French Land Register data, which excludes lakes, ponds, glaciers > 1 km^{2} (0.386 sq mi or 247 acres) and river estuaries.

Santosse (French pronunciation: [sɑ̃tɔs]) is a commune in the Côte-d'Or department in eastern France.

== Population ==
Historical population
Year	Pop.	±% p.a.
1968	69	—
1975	54	−3.44%
1982	39	−4.54%
1990	42	+0.93%
1999	38	−1.11%
2007	46	+2.42%
2012	51	+2.09%
2017	51	+0.00%
2023	61	+3.03%
Source: INSEE

== See also ==
- Communes of the Côte-d'Or department
