= Corcelles-les-Arts =

- Commune
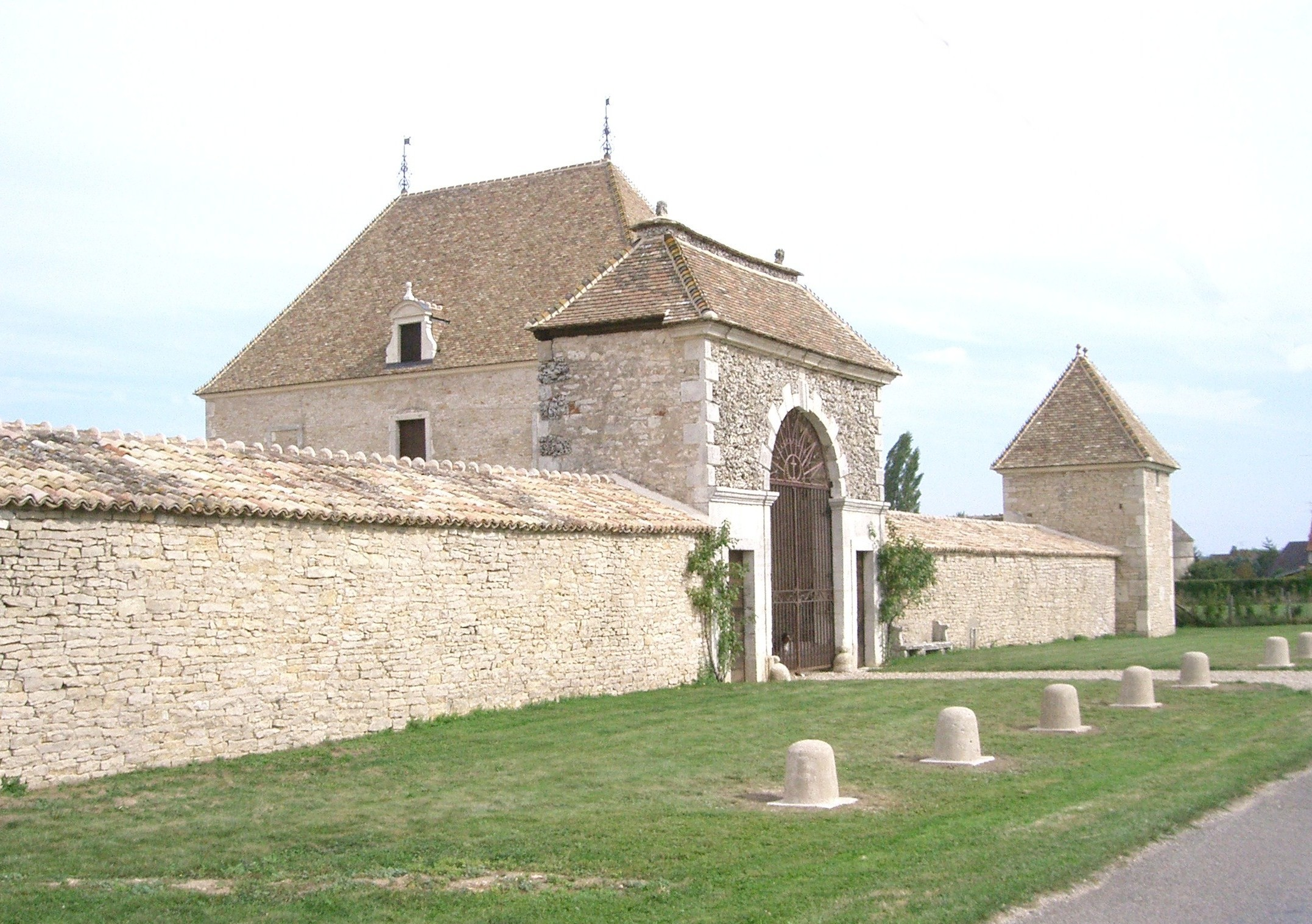
- Chateau of Masse

- Coat of arms
- Location of Corcelles-les-Arts
- Location within France Location within Bourgogne-Franche-Comté
- Coordinates: 46°57′12″N 4°47′42″E
- Country: France
- Region: Bourgogne-Franche-Comté
- Department: Côte-d'Or
- Arrondissement: Beaune
- Canton: Ladoix-Serrigny
- Intercommunality: CA Beaune Côte et Sud

Government
  - Mayor (2022–2026): Thierry Dubuisson
- Area^{1}: 5.47 km^{2} (2.11 sq mi)
- Highest elevation: 221 m (725 ft)
- Lowest elevation: 195 m (640 ft)
- Population (2023): 425
  - Density: 77.7/km^{2} (201/sq mi)
- Time zone: UTC+01:00 (CET)
  - Summer (DST): UTC+02:00 (CEST)
- INSEE/Postal code: 21190 /21190
- ^{1} French Land Register data, which excludes lakes, ponds, glaciers > 1 km^{2} (0.386 sq mi or 247 acres) and river estuaries.

Corcelles-les-Arts (French pronunciation: [kɔʁsɛl le.z‿aʁ]) is a commune in the Côte-d'Or department in eastern France.

== Population ==
Historical population
Year	Pop.	±% p.a.
1968	230	—
1975	229	−0.06%
1982	295	+3.68%
1990	375	+3.04%
1999	409	+0.97%
2007	473	+1.83%
2012	462	−0.47%
2017	462	+0.00%
2023	425	−1.38%
Source: INSEE

== Masse Castle ==
Masse Castle is a fifteenth-century castle in Corcelles-les-Arts. It has been registered as a historic monument since 1976. This castle, fully restored and inhabited, has square walls with a small tower at each corner, and a classic style interior. The land surrounding Masse Castle was used for the production of consumer wine as late as the nineteenth century.
