= Nantoux =

- Commune
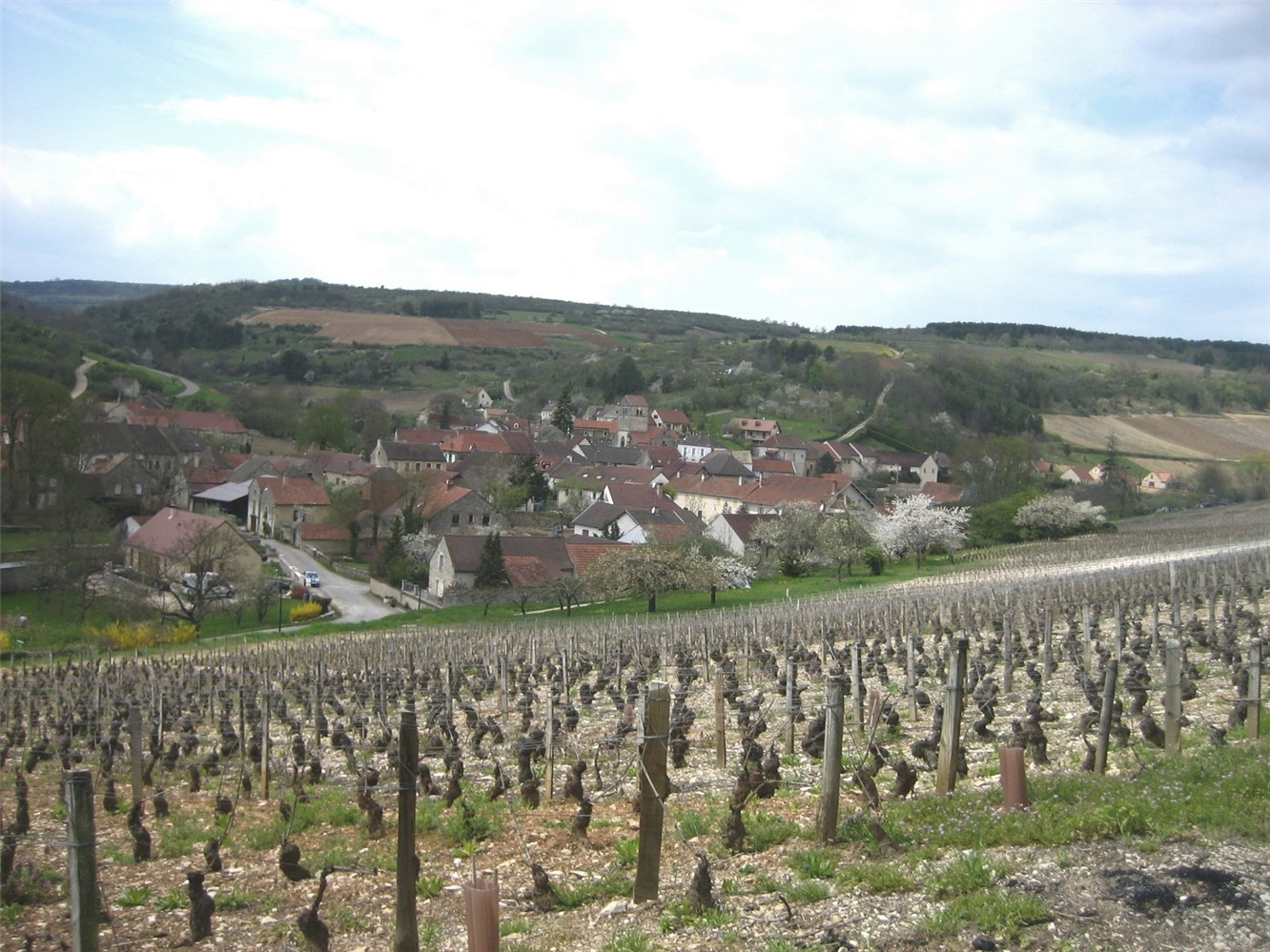
- A general view of Nantoux

- Coat of arms
- Location of Nantoux
- Location within France Location within Bourgogne-Franche-Comté
- Coordinates: 47°02′02″N 4°45′40″E
- Country: France
- Region: Bourgogne-Franche-Comté
- Department: Côte-d'Or
- Arrondissement: Beaune
- Canton: Ladoix-Serrigny
- Intercommunality: CA Beaune Côte et Sud

Government
  - Mayor (2020–2026): Rémi Champaud
- Area^{1}: 6.58 km^{2} (2.54 sq mi)
- Highest elevation: 467 m (1,532 ft)
- Lowest elevation: 266 m (873 ft)
- Population (2023): 168
  - Density: 25.5/km^{2} (66.1/sq mi)
- Time zone: UTC+01:00 (CET)
  - Summer (DST): UTC+02:00 (CEST)
- INSEE/Postal code: 21450 /21190
- ^{1} French Land Register data, which excludes lakes, ponds, glaciers > 1 km^{2} (0.386 sq mi or 247 acres) and river estuaries.

Nantoux (French pronunciation: [nɑ̃tu]) is a commune in the Côte-d'Or department in eastern France.

== Population ==
Historical population
Year	Pop.	±% p.a.
1968	125	—
1975	134	+1.00%
1982	157	+2.29%
1990	155	−0.16%
1999	180	+1.68%
2007	195	+1.01%
2012	164	−3.40%
2017	167	+0.36%
2023	168	+0.10%
Source: INSEE

== See also ==
- Communes of the Côte-d'Or department
