= Sainte-Marie-la-Blanche =

- Commune
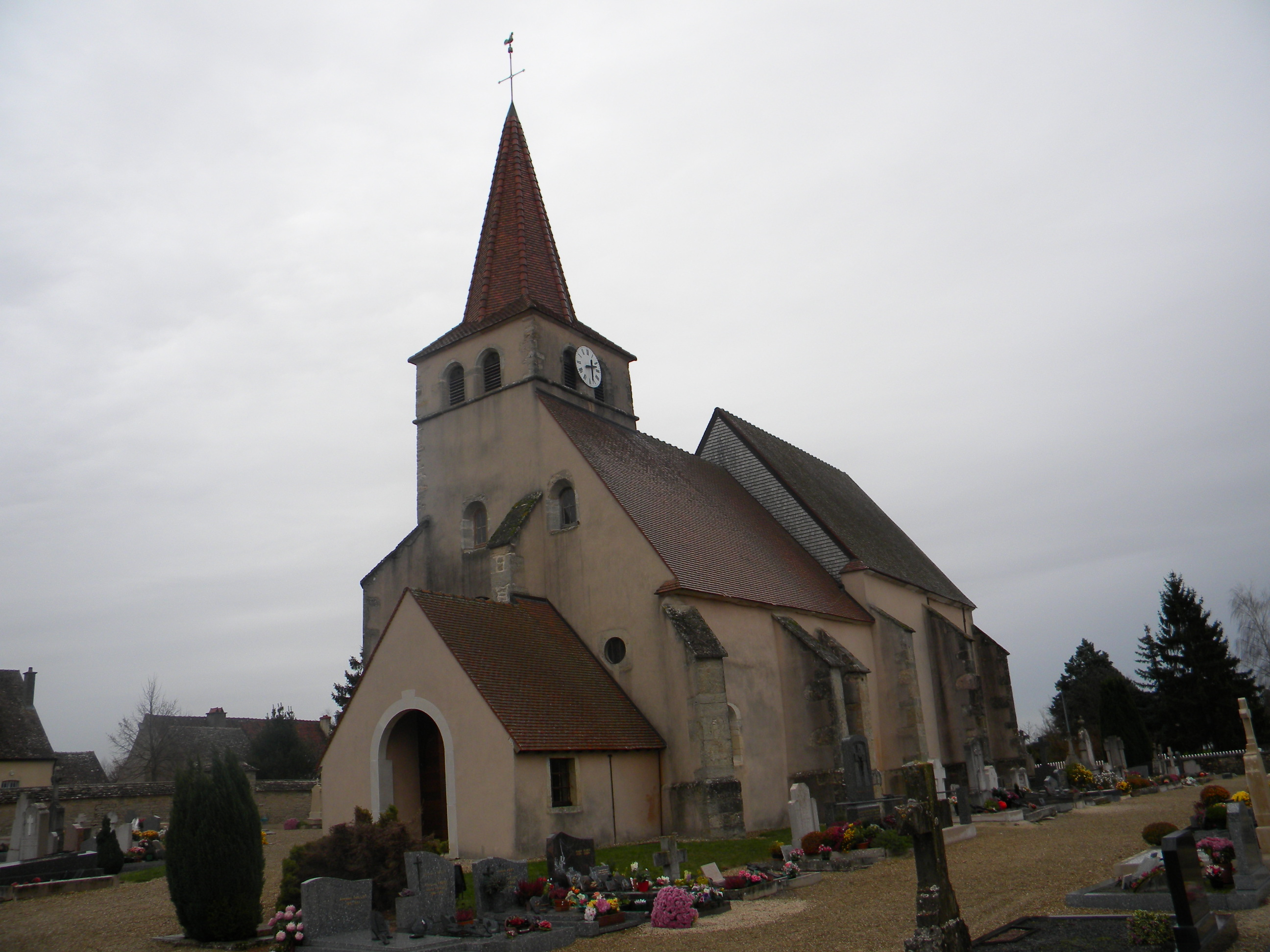
- The church in Sainte-Marie-la-Blanche

- Coat of arms
- Location of Sainte-Marie-la-Blanche
- Location within France Location within Bourgogne-Franche-Comté
- Coordinates: 46°58′43″N 4°53′31″E
- Country: France
- Region: Bourgogne-Franche-Comté
- Department: Côte-d'Or
- Arrondissement: Beaune
- Canton: Ladoix-Serrigny
- Intercommunality: CA Beaune Côte et Sud

Government
  - Mayor (2020–2026): Michel Quinet
- Area^{1}: 6.79 km^{2} (2.62 sq mi)
- Elevation: 198 m (650 ft)
- Highest elevation: 212 m (696 ft)
- Lowest elevation: 186 m (610 ft)
- Population (2023): 927
  - Density: 137/km^{2} (354/sq mi)
- Time zone: UTC+01:00 (CET)
  - Summer (DST): UTC+02:00 (CEST)
- INSEE/Postal code: 21558 /21200
- ^{1} French Land Register data, which excludes lakes, ponds, glaciers > 1 km^{2} (0.386 sq mi or 247 acres) and river estuaries.

Sainte-Marie-la-Blanche (French pronunciation: [sɛ̃t maʁi la blɑ̃ʃ]) is a commune in the Côte-d'Or department in eastern France.

== Population ==
Historical population
Year	Pop.	±% p.a.
1968	443	—
1975	484	+1.27%
1982	696	+5.33%
1990	693	−0.05%
1999	672	−0.34%
2007	779	+1.86%
2012	825	+1.15%
2017	882	+1.35%
2023	927	+0.83%
Source: INSEE

== See also ==
- Communes of the Côte-d'Or department
