= Communauté d'agglomération Beaune Côte et Sud =

Beaune Côte et Sud
- Communauté d'agglomération
- Interactive map of Beaune Côte et Sud
- Coordinates: 47°00′N 04°50′E
- Country: France
- Region: Bourgogne-Franche-Comté
- Department: Côte-d'Or, Saône-et-Loire
- No. of communes: {{{nbcomm}}}
- Established: 2007
- Area: 558.5 km^{2} (215.6 sq mi)
- Population (2019): 51,207
  - Density: 91.69/km^{2} (237.5/sq mi)
- Website: www.beaunecoteetsud.com

Communauté d'agglomération Beaune Côte et Sud (also: Communauté d'agglomération Beaune-Chagny-Nolay) is the communauté d'agglomération, an intercommunal structure, centred on the town of Beaune. It is located in the Côte-d'Or and Saône-et-Loire departments, in the Bourgogne-Franche-Comté region, eastern France. Created in 2007, its seat is in Beaune. Its area is 558.5 km^{2}. Its population was 51,207 in 2019, of which 20,551 in Beaune proper.

== Composition ==
The communauté d'agglomération consists of the following 53 communes, of which 5 in Saône-et-Loire:

1. Aloxe-Corton
2. Aubigny-la-Ronce
3. Auxey-Duresses
4. Baubigny
5. Beaune
6. Bligny-lès-Beaune
7. Bouilland
8. Bouze-lès-Beaune
9. Chagny
10. Change
11. Chassagne-Montrachet
12. Chaudenay
13. Chevigny-en-Valière
14. Chorey-les-Beaune
15. Combertault
16. Corberon
17. Corcelles-les-Arts
18. Corgengoux
19. Cormot-Vauchignon
20. Corpeau
21. Dezize-lès-Maranges
22. Ébaty
23. Échevronne
24. Ladoix-Serrigny
25. Levernois
26. Marigny-lès-Reullée
27. Mavilly-Mandelot
28. Meloisey
29. Merceuil
30. Meursanges
31. Meursault
32. Molinot
33. Montagny-lès-Beaune
34. Monthelie
35. Nantoux
36. Nolay
37. Paris-l'Hôpital
38. Pernand-Vergelesses
39. Pommard
40. Puligny-Montrachet
41. La Rochepot
42. Ruffey-lès-Beaune
43. Saint-Aubin
44. Sainte-Marie-la-Blanche
45. Saint-Romain
46. Santenay
47. Santosse
48. Savigny-lès-Beaune
49. Tailly
50. Thury
51. Val-Mont
52. Vignoles
53. Volnay
