= Chevigny-en-Valière =

- Commune
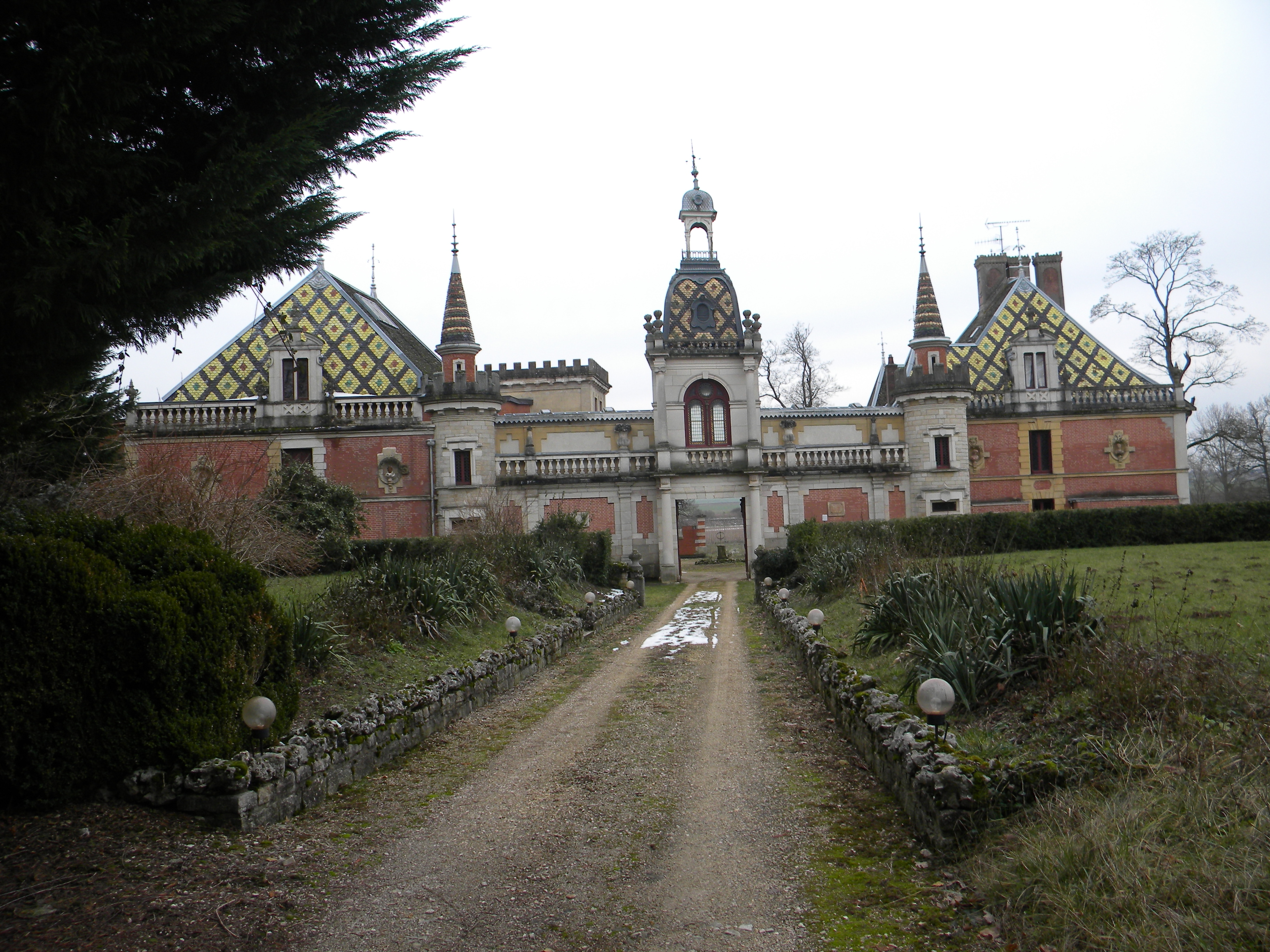
- The chateau in Chevigny-en-Valière

- Coat of arms
- Location of Chevigny-en-Valière
- Location within France Location within Bourgogne-Franche-Comté
- Coordinates: 46°58′04″N 4°58′34″E
- Country: France
- Region: Bourgogne-Franche-Comté
- Department: Côte-d'Or
- Arrondissement: Beaune
- Canton: Ladoix-Serrigny
- Intercommunality: CA Beaune Côte et Sud

Government
  - Mayor (2020–2026): Jean-Claude Brousse
- Area^{1}: 5.5 km^{2} (2.1 sq mi)
- Highest elevation: 194 m (636 ft)
- Lowest elevation: 177 m (581 ft)
- Population (2023): 417
  - Density: 76/km^{2} (200/sq mi)
- Time zone: UTC+01:00 (CET)
  - Summer (DST): UTC+02:00 (CEST)
- INSEE/Postal code: 21170 /21200
- ^{1} French Land Register data, which excludes lakes, ponds, glaciers > 1 km^{2} (0.386 sq mi or 247 acres) and river estuaries.

Chevigny-en-Valière (French pronunciation: [ʃəviɲi ɑ̃ valjɛʁ]) is a commune in the Côte-d'Or department in eastern France.

== Population ==
Historical population
Year	Pop.	±% p.a.
1968	165	—
1975	153	−1.07%
1982	195	+3.53%
1990	235	+2.36%
1999	233	−0.09%
2007	259	+1.33%
2012	312	+3.79%
2017	358	+2.79%
2023	417	+2.58%
Source: INSEE

== See also ==
- Communes of the Côte-d'Or department
