= Saint-Aubin, Côte-d'Or =

Saint-Aubin
- Commune
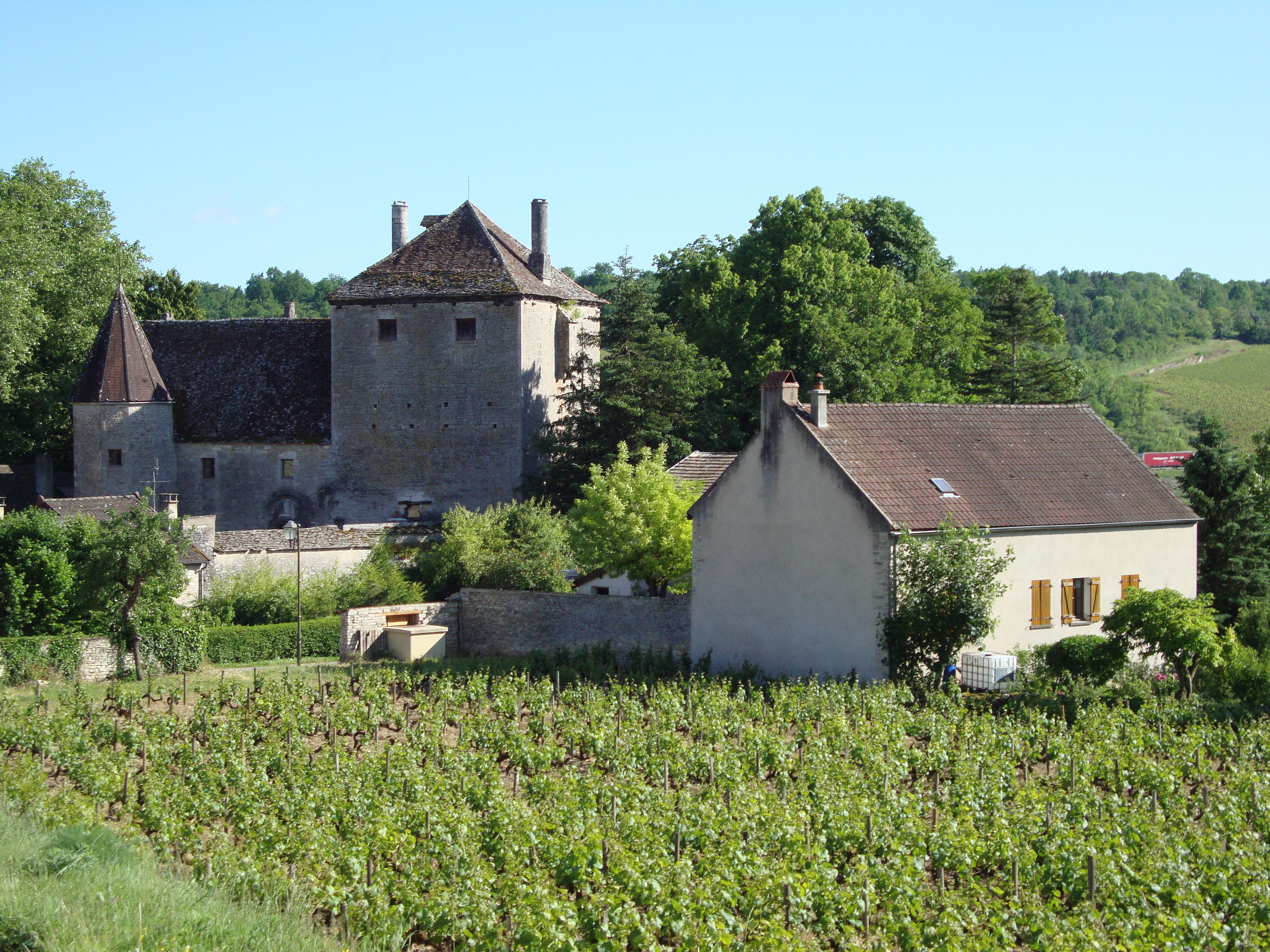
- Vineyards and the chateau of Gamay

- Coat of arms
- Location of Saint-Aubin
- Location within France Location within Bourgogne-Franche-Comté
- Coordinates: 46°57′04″N 4°42′37″E
- Country: France
- Region: Bourgogne-Franche-Comté
- Department: Côte-d'Or
- Arrondissement: Beaune
- Canton: Ladoix-Serrigny
- Intercommunality: CA Beaune Côte et Sud

Government
  - Mayor (2020–2026): Michel Moingeon
- Area^{1}: 9.42 km^{2} (3.64 sq mi)
- Elevation: 287 m (942 ft)
- Highest elevation: 485 m (1,591 ft)
- Lowest elevation: 240 m (790 ft)
- Population (2023): 195
  - Density: 20.7/km^{2} (53.6/sq mi)
- Time zone: UTC+01:00 (CET)
  - Summer (DST): UTC+02:00 (CEST)
- INSEE/Postal code: 21541 /21190
- ^{1} French Land Register data, which excludes lakes, ponds, glaciers > 1 km^{2} (0.386 sq mi or 247 acres) and river estuaries.

Saint-Aubin (French pronunciation: [sɛ̃.t‿obɛ̃]) is a commune in the Côte-d'Or department in eastern France.

== Population ==
Historical population
Year	Pop.	±% p.a.
1968	308	—
1975	288	−0.95%
1982	281	−0.35%
1990	239	−2.00%
1999	248	+0.41%
2007	269	+1.02%
2012	249	−1.53%
2017	223	−2.18%
2023	195	−2.21%
Source: INSEE

== Wine ==
Saint-Aubin is one of the wine communes of the Côte de Beaune.

== See also ==
- Communes of the Côte-d'Or department
