= Vignoles, Côte-d'Or =

Vignoles
- Commune
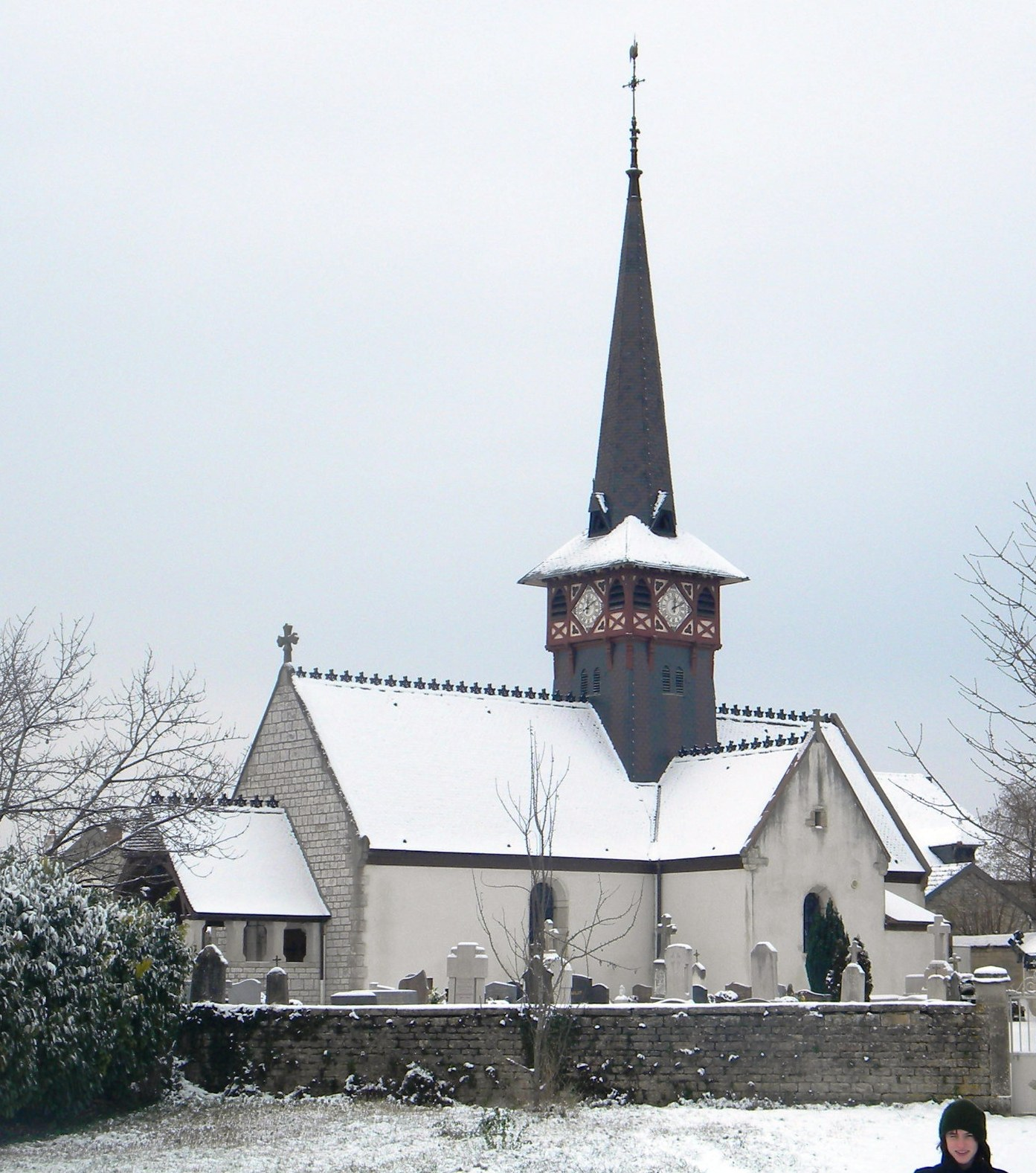
- The church in Vignoles

- Coat of arms
- Location of Vignoles
- Location within France Location within Bourgogne-Franche-Comté
- Coordinates: 47°01′52″N 4°53′19″E
- Country: France
- Region: Bourgogne-Franche-Comté
- Department: Côte-d'Or
- Arrondissement: Beaune
- Canton: Ladoix-Serrigny
- Intercommunality: CA Beaune Côte et Sud

Government
  - Mayor (2020–2026): Jean Marey
- Area^{1}: 6.72 km^{2} (2.59 sq mi)
- Highest elevation: 216 m (709 ft)
- Lowest elevation: 191 m (627 ft)
- Population (2023): 907
  - Density: 135/km^{2} (350/sq mi)
- Time zone: UTC+01:00 (CET)
  - Summer (DST): UTC+02:00 (CEST)
- INSEE/Postal code: 21684 /21200
- ^{1} French Land Register data, which excludes lakes, ponds, glaciers > 1 km^{2} (0.386 sq mi or 247 acres) and river estuaries.

Vignoles (French pronunciation: [viɲɔl]) is a commune in the Côte-d'Or department in eastern France.

== Population ==
Historical population
Year	Pop.	±% p.a.
1968	276	—
1975	309	+1.63%
1982	411	+4.16%
1990	552	+3.76%
1999	727	+3.11%
2007	729	+0.03%
2012	883	+3.91%
2017	977	+2.04%
2023	907	−1.23%
Source: INSEE

== See also ==
- Communes of the Côte-d'Or department
