= Échevronne =

- Commune
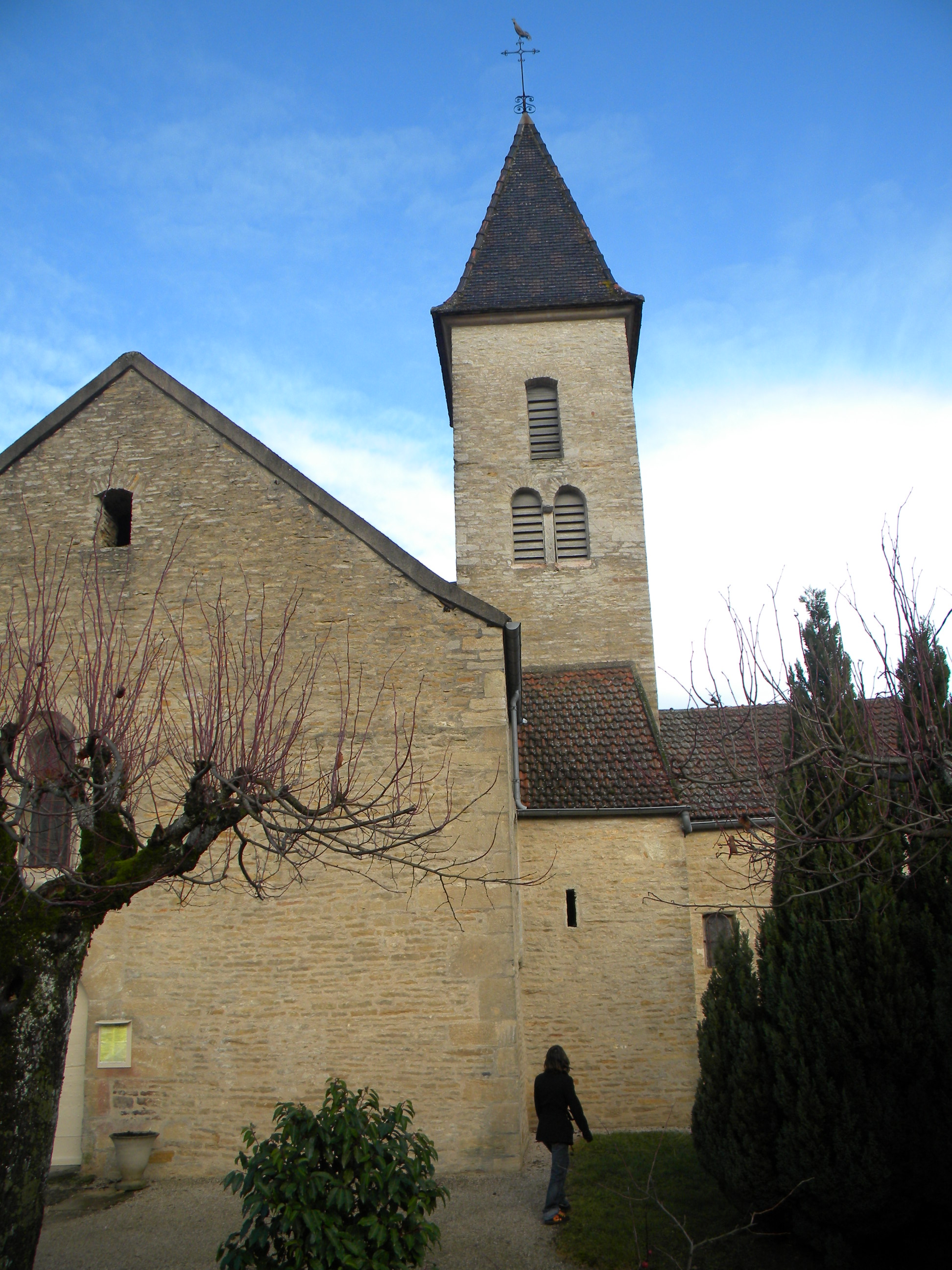
- The church in Échevronne

- Coat of arms
- Location of Échevronne
- Location within France Location within Bourgogne-Franche-Comté
- Coordinates: 47°06′23″N 4°51′06″E
- Country: France
- Region: Bourgogne-Franche-Comté
- Department: Côte-d'Or
- Arrondissement: Beaune
- Canton: Ladoix-Serrigny
- Intercommunality: CA Beaune Côte et Sud

Government
  - Mayor (2020–2026): Jean-Luc Petit
- Area^{1}: 8.69 km^{2} (3.36 sq mi)
- Highest elevation: 600 m (2,000 ft)
- Lowest elevation: 304 m (997 ft)
- Population (2023): 316
  - Density: 36.4/km^{2} (94.2/sq mi)
- Time zone: UTC+01:00 (CET)
  - Summer (DST): UTC+02:00 (CEST)
- INSEE/Postal code: 21241 /21420
- ^{1} French Land Register data, which excludes lakes, ponds, glaciers > 1 km^{2} (0.386 sq mi or 247 acres) and river estuaries.

Échevronne (French pronunciation: [eʃvʁɔn]) is a commune in the Côte-d'Or department in eastern France.

== Population ==
Historical population
Year	Pop.	±% p.a.
1968	187	—
1975	165	−1.77%
1982	219	+4.13%
1990	230	+0.61%
1999	268	+1.71%
2007	271	+0.14%
2012	287	+1.15%
2017	284	−0.21%
2023	316	+1.80%
Source: INSEE

== See also ==
- Communes of the Côte-d'Or department
