= Bouze-lès-Beaune =

- Commune
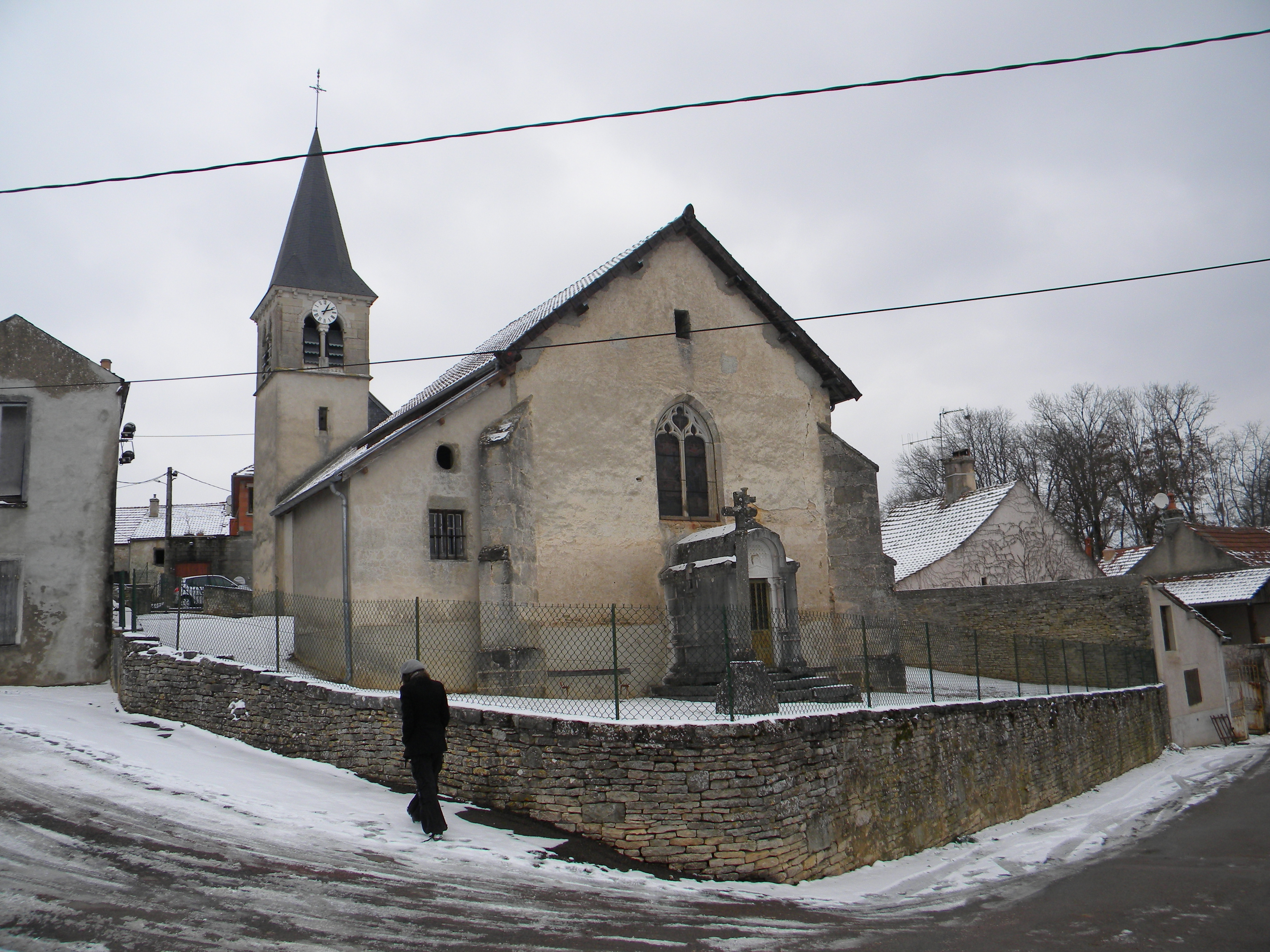
- The church in Bouze-lès-Beaune

- Coat of arms
- Location of Bouze-lès-Beaune
- Location within France Location within Bourgogne-Franche-Comté
- Coordinates: 47°03′09″N 4°46′20″E
- Country: France
- Region: Bourgogne-Franche-Comté
- Department: Côte-d'Or
- Arrondissement: Beaune
- Canton: Ladoix-Serrigny
- Intercommunality: CA Beaune Côte et Sud

Government
  - Mayor (2020–2026): Pascal Huguenin
- Area^{1}: 6.91 km^{2} (2.67 sq mi)
- Highest elevation: 540 m (1,770 ft)
- Lowest elevation: 317 m (1,040 ft)
- Population (2023): 312
  - Density: 45.2/km^{2} (117/sq mi)
- Time zone: UTC+01:00 (CET)
  - Summer (DST): UTC+02:00 (CEST)
- INSEE/Postal code: 21099 /21200
- ^{1} French Land Register data, which excludes lakes, ponds, glaciers > 1 km^{2} (0.386 sq mi or 247 acres) and river estuaries.

Bouze-lès-Beaune (French pronunciation: [buz lɛ bon], literally Bouze near Beaune) is a commune in the Côte-d'Or department in eastern France.

== Population ==
Historical population
| Year | Pop. | ±% p.a. |
|---|---|---|
| 1968 | 190 | — |
| 1975 | 185 | −0.38% |
| 1982 | 218 | +2.37% |
| 1990 | 247 | +1.57% |
| 1999 | 261 | +0.61% |
| 2007 | 328 | +2.90% |
| 2012 | 331 | +0.18% |
| 2017 | 314 | −1.05% |
| 2023 | 312 | −0.11% |
Source: INSEE

== See also ==
- Communes of the Côte-d'Or department
