= Mavilly-Mandelot =

- Commune
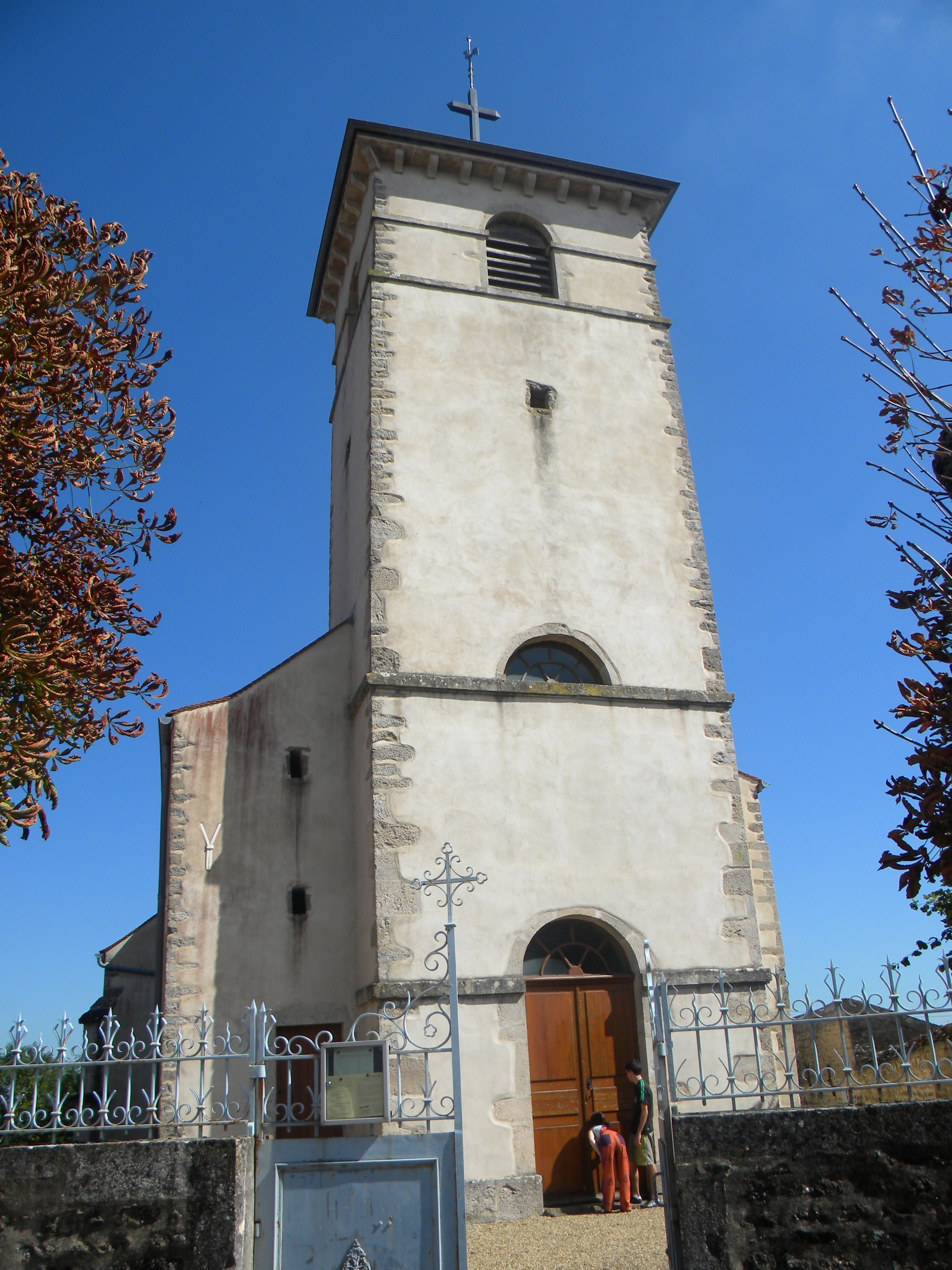
- The church in Mavilly

- Coat of arms
- Location of Mavilly-Mandelot
- Location within France Location within Bourgogne-Franche-Comté
- Coordinates: 47°02′59″N 4°44′19″E
- Country: France
- Region: Bourgogne-Franche-Comté
- Department: Côte-d'Or
- Arrondissement: Beaune
- Canton: Ladoix-Serrigny
- Intercommunality: CA Beaune Côte et Sud

Government
  - Mayor (2023–2026): Sylvain Bruchard
- Area^{1}: 9.8 km^{2} (3.8 sq mi)
- Highest elevation: 588 m (1,929 ft)
- Lowest elevation: 345 m (1,132 ft)
- Population (2023): 166
  - Density: 17/km^{2} (44/sq mi)
- Time zone: UTC+01:00 (CET)
  - Summer (DST): UTC+02:00 (CEST)
- INSEE/Postal code: 21397 /21190
- ^{1} French Land Register data, which excludes lakes, ponds, glaciers > 1 km^{2} (0.386 sq mi or 247 acres) and river estuaries.

Mavilly-Mandelot is a commune in the Côte-d'Or department in the region of Bourgogne-Franche-Comté in eastern France.

== Population ==
Historical population
Year	Pop.	±% p.a.
1968	154	—
1975	144	−0.95%
1982	146	+0.20%
1990	152	+0.50%
1999	154	+0.15%
2007	154	+0.00%
2012	167	+1.63%
2017	178	+1.28%
2023	166	−1.16%
Source: INSEE

== See also ==
- Communes of the Côte-d'Or department
