= Corgengoux =

- Commune
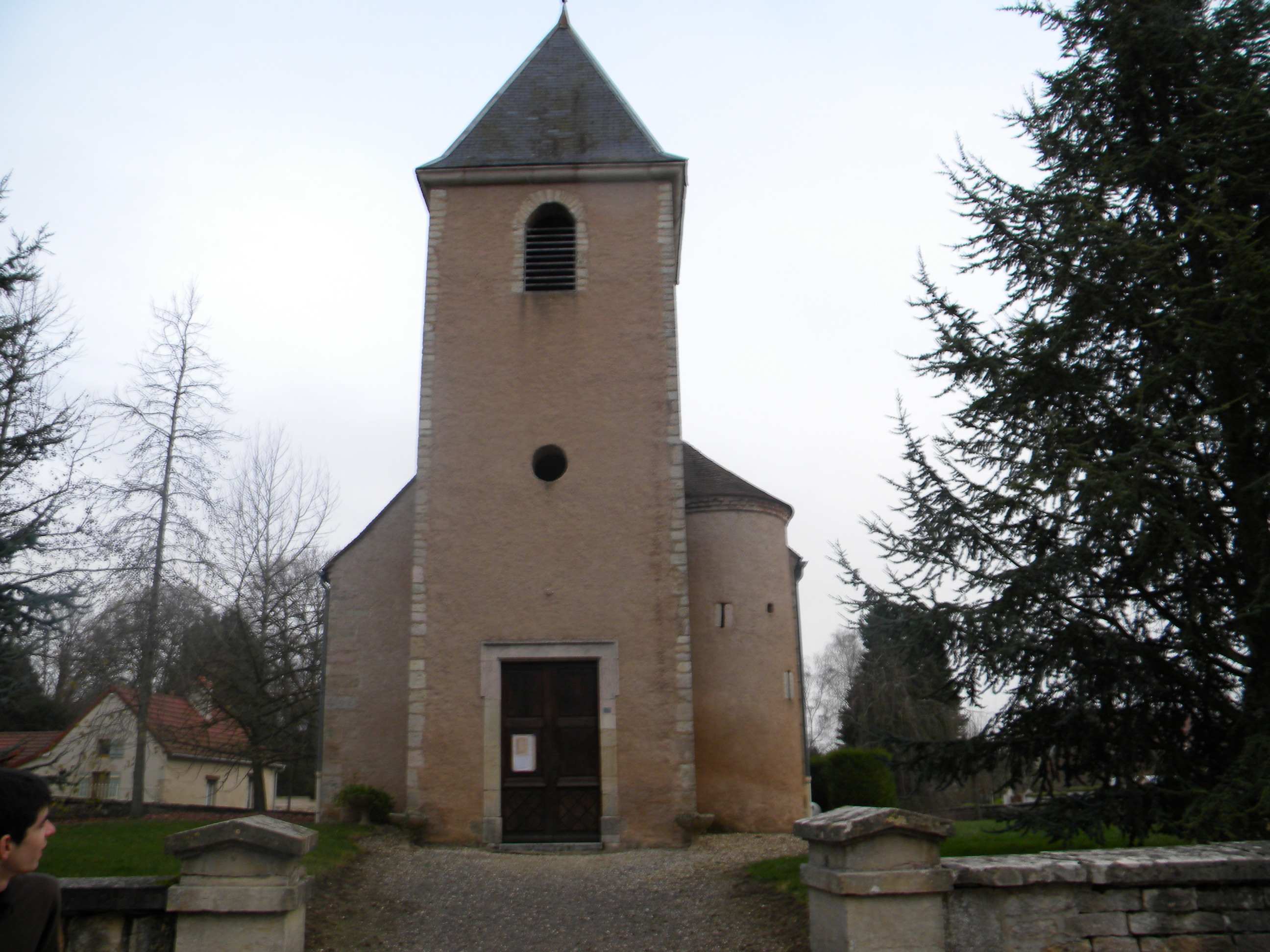
- The church in Corgengoux

- Coat of arms
- Location of Corgengoux
- Location within France Location within Bourgogne-Franche-Comté
- Coordinates: 46°59′29″N 4°59′21″E
- Country: France
- Region: Bourgogne-Franche-Comté
- Department: Côte-d'Or
- Arrondissement: Beaune
- Canton: Ladoix-Serrigny
- Intercommunality: CA Beaune Côte et Sud

Government
  - Mayor (2020–2026): Pierre Brouant
- Area^{1}: 12.53 km^{2} (4.84 sq mi)
- Elevation: 185 m (607 ft)
- Highest elevation: 205 m (673 ft)
- Lowest elevation: 177 m (581 ft)
- Population (2023): 389
  - Density: 31.0/km^{2} (80.4/sq mi)
- Time zone: UTC+01:00 (CET)
  - Summer (DST): UTC+02:00 (CEST)
- INSEE/Postal code: 21193 /21250
- ^{1} French Land Register data, which excludes lakes, ponds, glaciers > 1 km^{2} (0.386 sq mi or 247 acres) and river estuaries.

Corgengoux (French pronunciation: [kɔʁʒɑ̃ɡu]) is a commune in the Côte-d'Or department in eastern France.

== Population ==
Historical population
Year	Pop.	±% p.a.
1968	240	—
1975	207	−2.09%
1982	234	+1.77%
1990	250	+0.83%
1999	283	+1.39%
2007	336	+2.17%
2012	385	+2.76%
2017	368	−0.90%
2023	389	+0.93%
Source: INSEE

== See also ==
- Communes of the Côte-d'Or department
