= Marigny-lès-Reullée =

- Commune
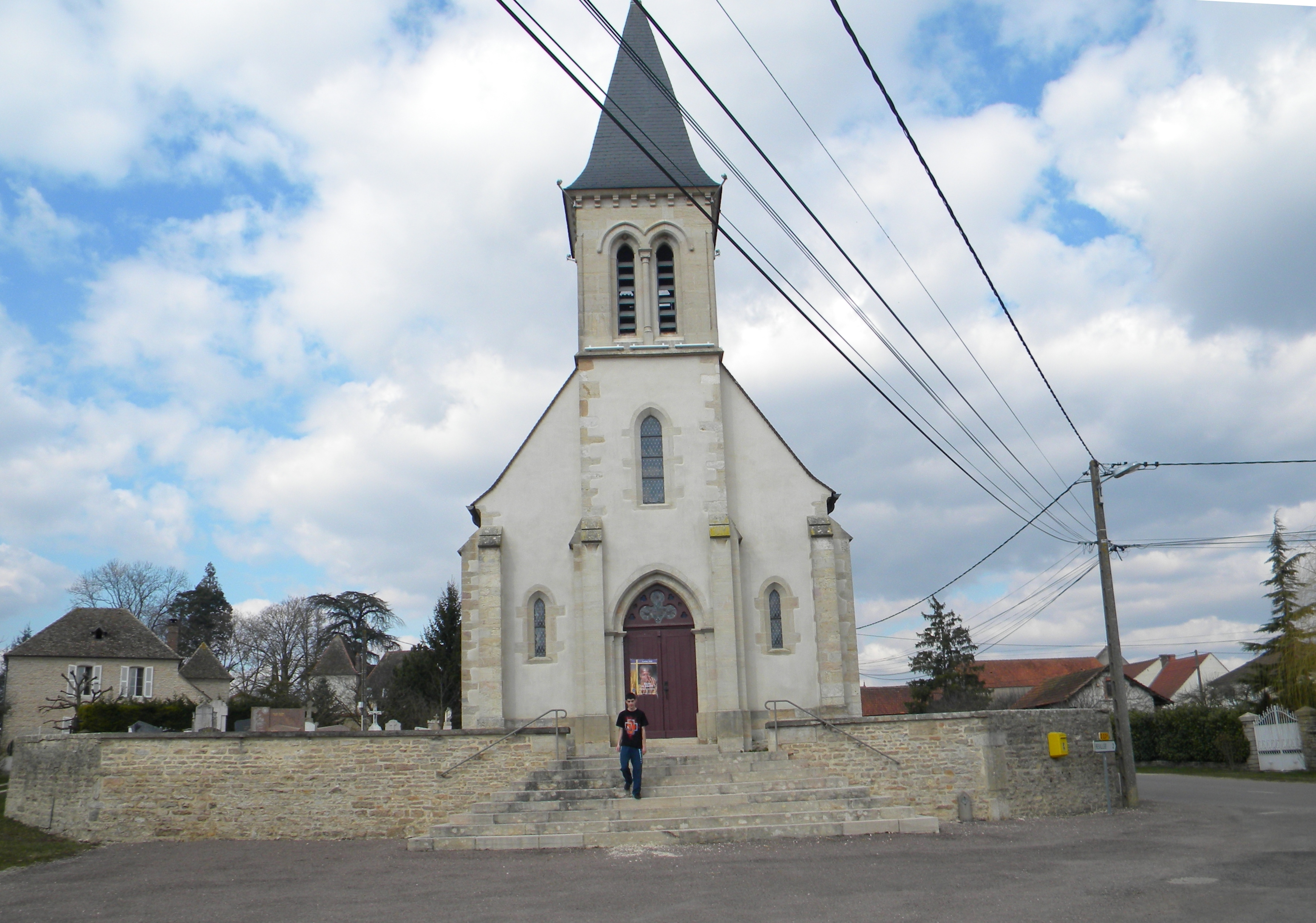
- The church in Marigny-lès-Reullée
- Location of Marigny-lès-Reullée
- Location within France Location within Bourgogne-Franche-Comté
- Coordinates: 46°59′54″N 4°57′52″E
- Country: France
- Region: Bourgogne-Franche-Comté
- Department: Côte-d'Or
- Arrondissement: Beaune
- Canton: Ladoix-Serrigny
- Intercommunality: CA Beaune Côte et Sud

Government
  - Mayor (2024–2026): Régis Deboibe
- Area^{1}: 10.02 km^{2} (3.87 sq mi)
- Highest elevation: 201 m (659 ft)
- Lowest elevation: 179 m (587 ft)
- Population (2023): 211
  - Density: 21.1/km^{2} (54.5/sq mi)
- Time zone: UTC+01:00 (CET)
  - Summer (DST): UTC+02:00 (CEST)
- INSEE/Postal code: 21387 /21200
- ^{1} French Land Register data, which excludes lakes, ponds, glaciers > 1 km^{2} (0.386 sq mi or 247 acres) and river estuaries.

Marigny-lès-Reullée (French pronunciation: [maʁiɲi lɛ ʁøle]) is a commune in the Côte-d'Or department in eastern France.

== Population ==
Historical population
Year	Pop.	±% p.a.
1968	134	—
1975	101	−3.96%
1982	144	+5.20%
1990	168	+1.95%
1999	171	+0.20%
2007	190	+1.33%
2012	201	+1.13%
2017	216	+1.45%
2023	211	−0.39%
Source: INSEE

== See also ==
- Communes of the Côte-d'Or department
