= Chorey-les-Beaune =

- Commune
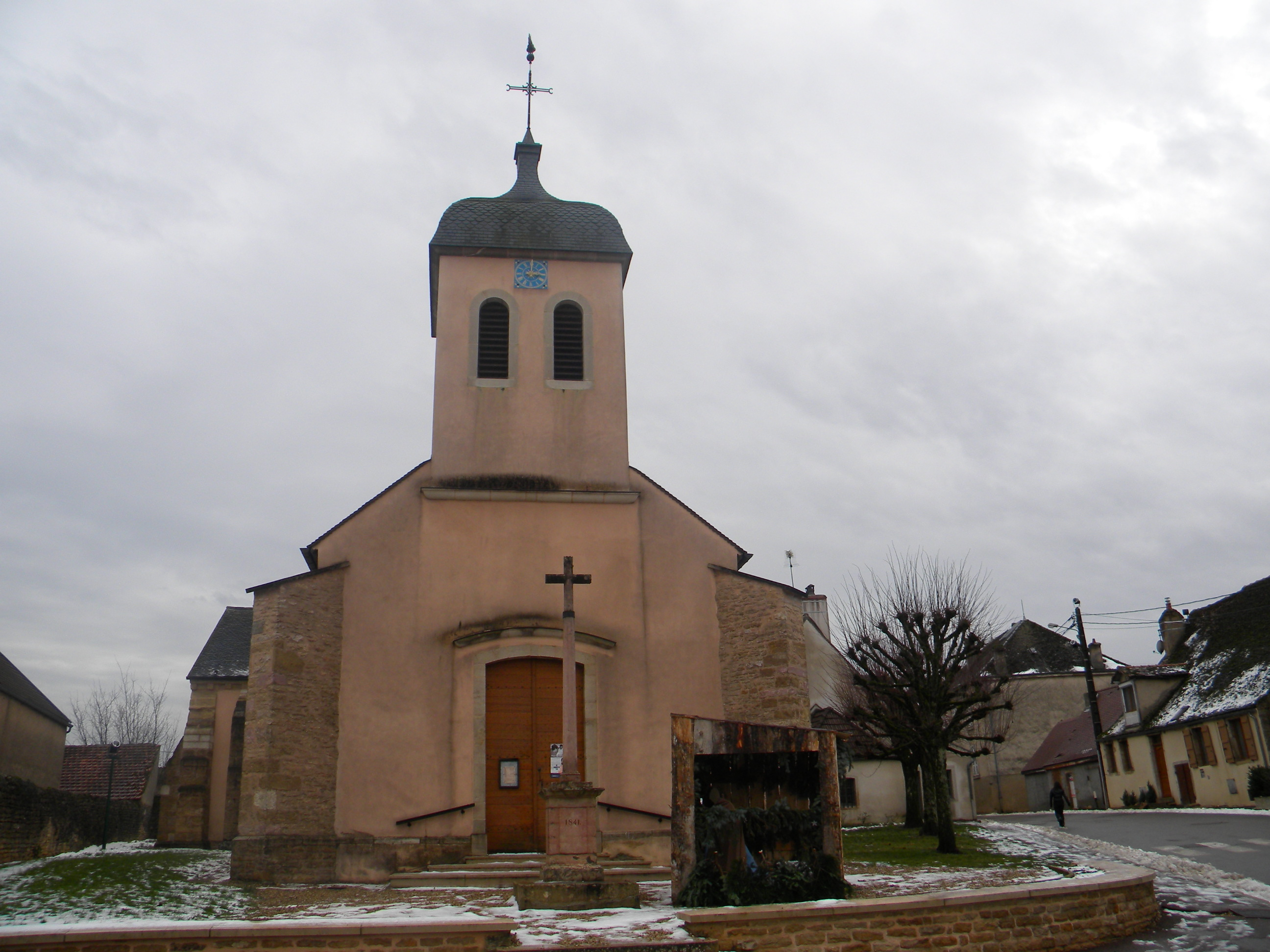
- The church in Chorey-les-Beaune

- Coat of arms
- Location of Chorey-les-Beaune
- Location within France Location within Bourgogne-Franche-Comté
- Coordinates: 47°02′53″N 4°52′06″E
- Country: France
- Region: Bourgogne-Franche-Comté
- Department: Côte-d'Or
- Arrondissement: Beaune
- Canton: Ladoix-Serrigny
- Intercommunality: CA Beaune Côte et Sud

Government
  - Mayor (2020–2026): Arnauld Guichard
- Area^{1}: 5.59 km^{2} (2.16 sq mi)
- Elevation: 217 m (712 ft)
- Highest elevation: 245 m (804 ft)
- Lowest elevation: 199 m (653 ft)
- Population (2023): 592
  - Density: 106/km^{2} (274/sq mi)
- Time zone: UTC+01:00 (CET)
  - Summer (DST): UTC+02:00 (CEST)
- INSEE/Postal code: 21173 /21200
- ^{1} French Land Register data, which excludes lakes, ponds, glaciers > 1 km^{2} (0.386 sq mi or 247 acres) and river estuaries.

Chorey-les-Beaune (French pronunciation: [ʃɔʁɛ le bɔn], literally Chorey near Beaune) is a commune in the Côte-d'Or department in eastern France.

It lies northeast of the city of Beaune on the plain of the Saône just to the east of the A31 autoroute.

== Population ==
Historical population
Year	Pop.	±% p.a.
1968	422	—
1975	484	+1.98%
1982	503	+0.55%
1990	508	+0.12%
1999	516	+0.17%
2007	472	−1.11%
2012	635	+6.11%
2017	633	−0.06%
2023	592	−1.11%
Source: INSEE

== Wine ==
Chorey-les-Beaune is one of the wine communes of the Côte de Beaune. The wines of Chorey-les-Beaune grow on the relatively flat land of the Saône plain, rather than on the slopes of the Côte d'Or, and for this reason the commune has no Premier Cru (or Grand Cru) vineyards. The soils are composed mostly of quaternary detrital and alluvial fills, and the wines tend to be thinner and less complex than those grown on the Jurassic limestone, gravels, and marls of the slopes from which the better quality wines of the Côte d'Or come.

== See also ==
- Côte de Beaune
