= Thury, Côte-d'Or =

Thury
- Commune
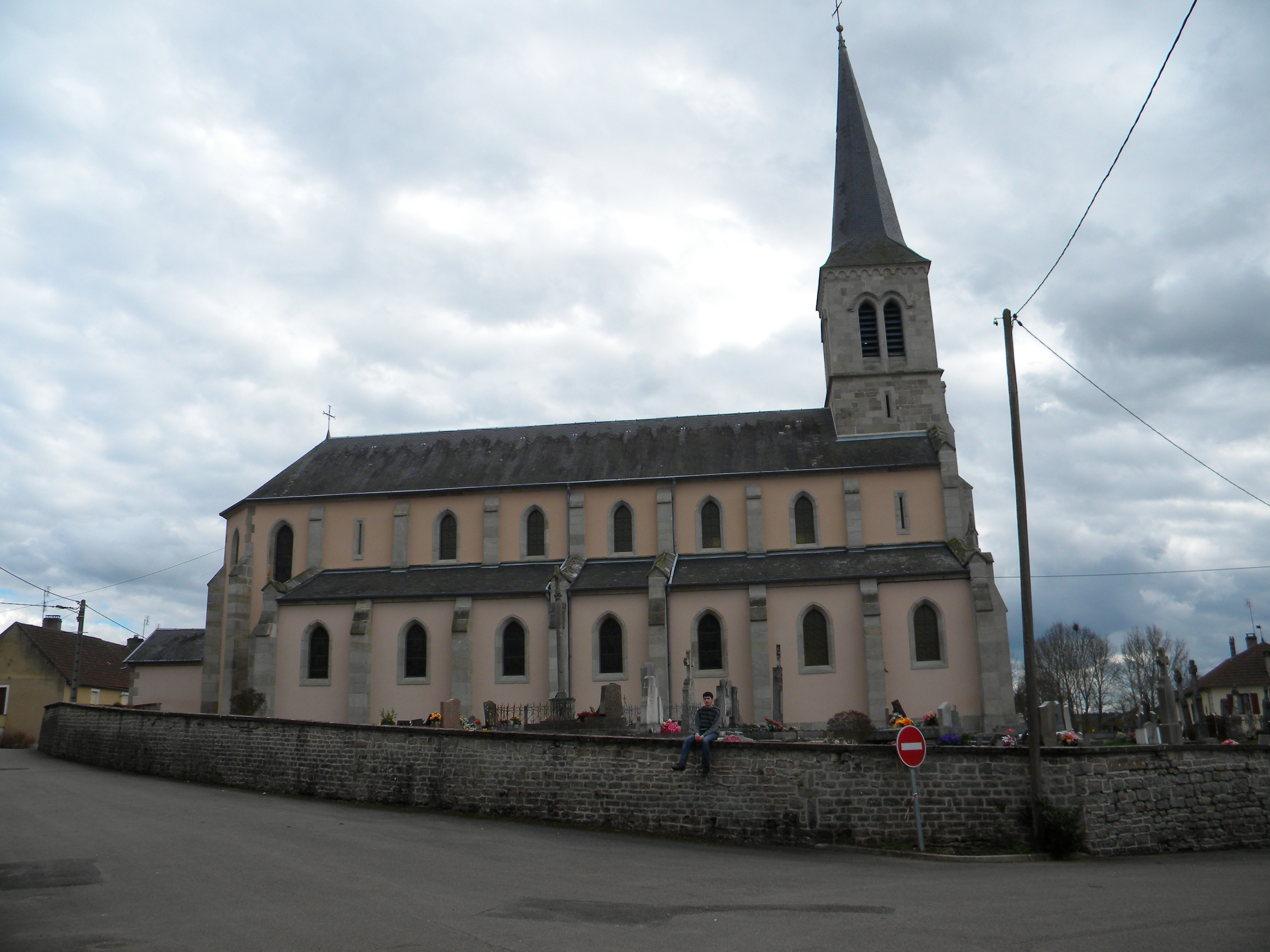
- The church in Thury

- Coat of arms
- Location of Thury
- Location within France Location within Bourgogne-Franche-Comté
- Coordinates: 47°02′03″N 4°31′30″E
- Country: France
- Region: Bourgogne-Franche-Comté
- Department: Côte-d'Or
- Arrondissement: Beaune
- Canton: Arnay-le-Duc
- Intercommunality: CA Beaune Côte et Sud

Government
  - Mayor (2020–2026): Daniel Truchot
- Area^{1}: 13.27 km^{2} (5.12 sq mi)
- Highest elevation: 455 m (1,493 ft)
- Lowest elevation: 337 m (1,106 ft)
- Population (2023): 262
  - Density: 19.7/km^{2} (51.1/sq mi)
- Time zone: UTC+01:00 (CET)
  - Summer (DST): UTC+02:00 (CEST)
- INSEE/Postal code: 21636 /21340
- ^{1} French Land Register data, which excludes lakes, ponds, glaciers > 1 km^{2} (0.386 sq mi or 247 acres) and river estuaries.

Thury (French pronunciation: [tyʁi]) is a commune in the Côte-d'Or department in eastern France.

== Population ==
Historical population
Year	Pop.	±% p.a.
1968	342	—
1975	344	+0.08%
1982	318	−1.12%
1990	310	−0.32%
1999	297	−0.47%
2007	287	−0.43%
2012	290	+0.21%
2017	275	−1.06%
2023	262	−0.80%
Source: INSEE

== See also ==
- Communes of the Côte-d'Or department
