= Canton of Ladoix-Serrigny =

Administrative division of France

Coordinates: 47.07°N 4.88°E

The canton of Ladoix-Serrigny is an administrative division of the Côte-d'Or department, eastern France. It was created at the French canton reorganisation which came into effect in March 2015. Its seat is in Ladoix-Serrigny.

It consists of the following communes:

1. Aloxe-Corton
2. Auxey-Duresses
3. Bligny-lès-Beaune
4. Bouilland
5. Bouze-lès-Beaune
6. Chassagne-Montrachet
7. Chevigny-en-Valière
8. Chorey-les-Beaune
9. Combertault
10. Corberon
11. Corcelles-les-Arts
12. Corgengoux
13. Corpeau
14. Ébaty
15. Échevronne
16. Ladoix-Serrigny
17. Levernois
18. Marigny-lès-Reullée
19. Mavilly-Mandelot
20. Meloisey
21. Merceuil
22. Meursanges
23. Meursault
24. Montagny-lès-Beaune
25. Monthelie
26. Nantoux
27. Pernand-Vergelesses
28. Pommard
29. Puligny-Montrachet
30. Ruffey-lès-Beaune
31. Saint-Aubin
32. Sainte-Marie-la-Blanche
33. Saint-Romain
34. Santenay
35. Savigny-lès-Beaune
36. Tailly
37. Vignoles
38. Volnay
