= Saint-Romain, Côte-d'Or =

Saint-Romain
- Commune
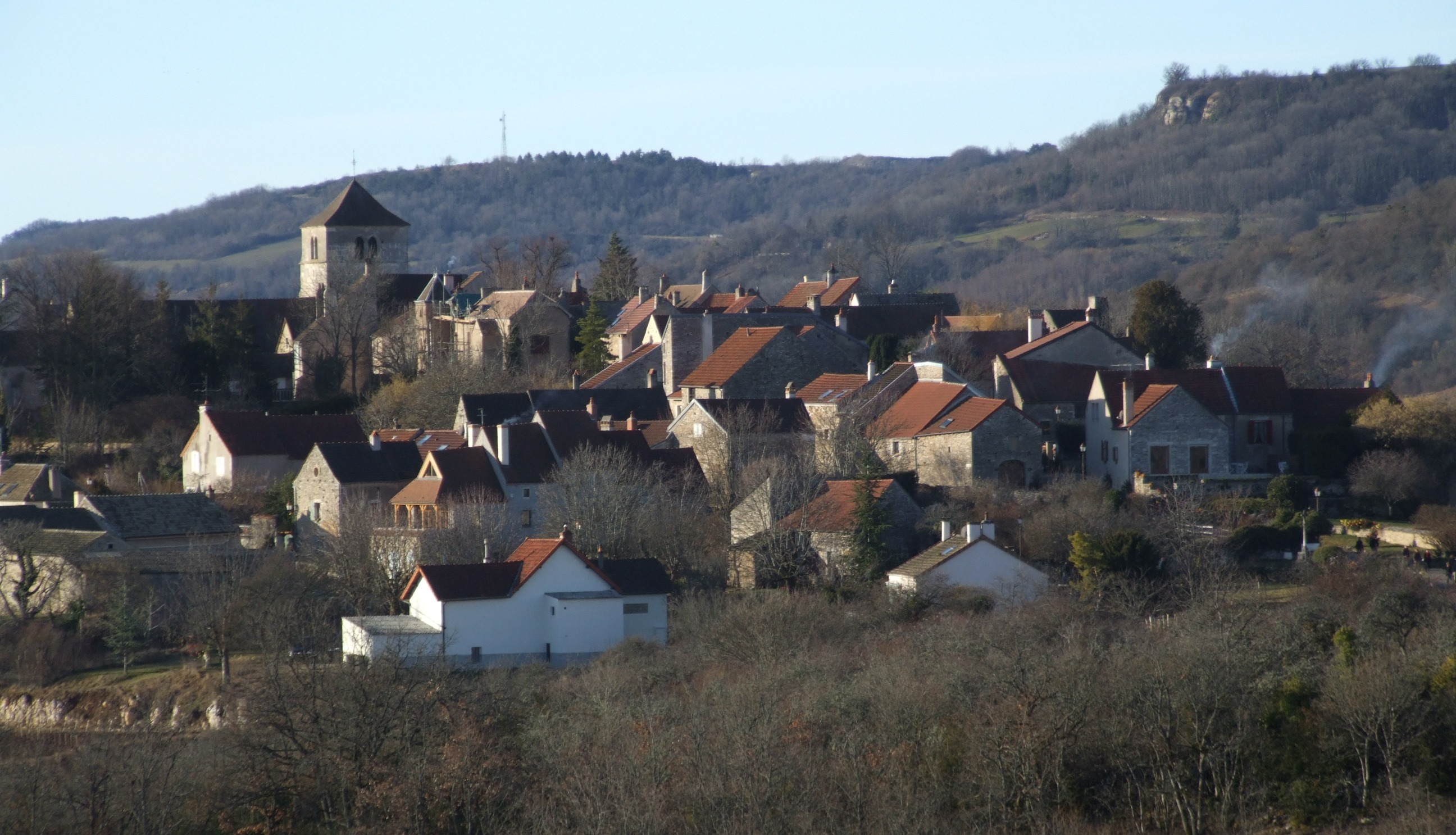
- A general view of Saint-Romain

- Coat of arms
- Location of Saint-Romain
- Location within France Location within Bourgogne-Franche-Comté
- Coordinates: 47°00′02″N 4°42′41″E
- Country: France
- Region: Bourgogne-Franche-Comté
- Department: Côte-d'Or
- Arrondissement: Beaune
- Canton: Ladoix-Serrigny
- Intercommunality: CA Beaune Côte et Sud

Government
  - Mayor (2020–2026): Serge Grappin
- Area^{1}: 12 km^{2} (4.6 sq mi)
- Highest elevation: 564 m (1,850 ft)
- Lowest elevation: 274 m (899 ft)
- Population (2023): 197
  - Density: 16/km^{2} (43/sq mi)
- Time zone: UTC+01:00 (CET)
  - Summer (DST): UTC+02:00 (CEST)
- INSEE/Postal code: 21569 /21190
- ^{1} French Land Register data, which excludes lakes, ponds, glaciers > 1 km^{2} (0.386 sq mi or 247 acres) and river estuaries.

Saint-Romain (French pronunciation: [sɛ̃ ʁɔmɛ̃]) is a commune in the Côte-d'Or department in eastern France.

== Population ==
Historical population
Year	Pop.	±% p.a.
1968	323	—
1975	265	−2.79%
1982	250	−0.83%
1990	241	−0.46%
1999	227	−0.66%
2007	243	+0.86%
2012	225	−1.53%
2017	220	−0.45%
2023	197	−1.82%
Source: INSEE

== Wine ==
Saint-Romain is one of the wine communes of the Côte de Beaune.

== See also ==
- Communes of the Côte-d'Or department
