= Pommard =

- Commune
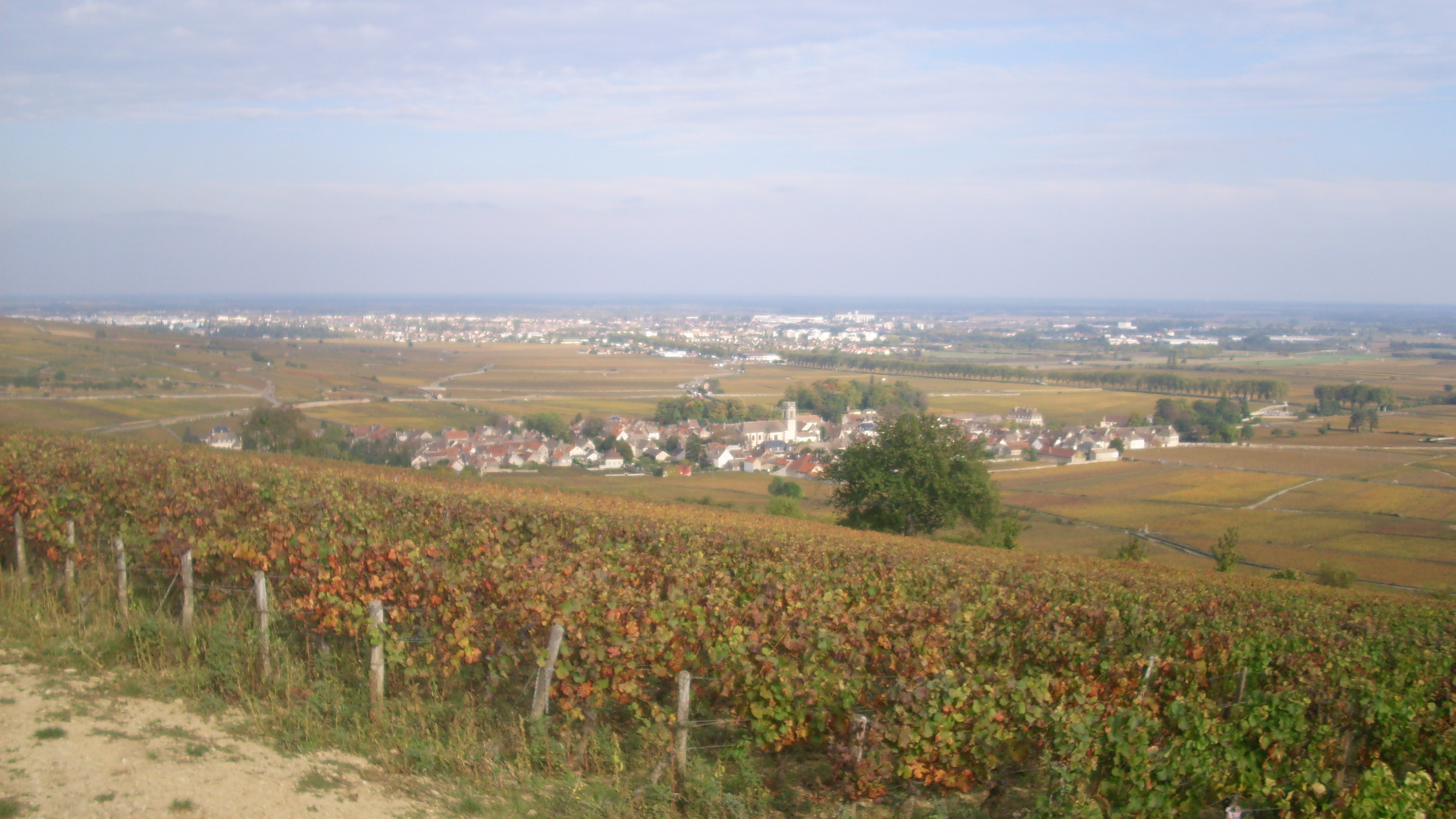
- A general view of Pommard

- Coat of arms
- Location of Pommard
- Location within France Location within Bourgogne-Franche-Comté
- Coordinates: 47°00′36″N 4°47′45″E
- Country: France
- Region: Bourgogne-Franche-Comté
- Department: Côte-d'Or
- Arrondissement: Beaune
- Canton: Ladoix-Serrigny
- Intercommunality: CA Beaune Côte et Sud

Government
  - Mayor (2020–2026): Jacques Frotey
- Area^{1}: 10.05 km^{2} (3.88 sq mi)
- Elevation: 248 m (814 ft)
- Highest elevation: 411 m (1,348 ft)
- Lowest elevation: 215 m (705 ft)
- Population (2023): 430
  - Density: 43/km^{2} (110/sq mi)
- Time zone: UTC+01:00 (CET)
  - Summer (DST): UTC+02:00 (CEST)
- INSEE/Postal code: 21492 /21630
- ^{1} French Land Register data, which excludes lakes, ponds, glaciers > 1 km^{2} (0.386 sq mi or 247 acres) and river estuaries.

Pommard (French pronunciation: [pɔmaʁ]) is a commune in the Côte-d'Or department and Bourgogne-Franche-Comté region of eastern France.

Famous for its Côte de Beaune wine production, Pommard is situated directly south of Beaune along the Route des Grands Crus. The D973 runs through the village from Beaune and then on to Saisy and Autun.

== Population ==
Historical population
Year	Pop.	±% p.a.
1968	840	—
1975	754	−1.53%
1982	606	−3.07%
1990	552	−1.16%
1999	594	+0.82%
2007	546	−1.05%
2012	521	−0.93%
2017	500	−0.82%
2023	430	−2.48%
Source: INSEE

== Wine ==
Like Nuits-Saint-Georges, the name of Pommard was made famous as a marketplace for wines from better areas, in the days before Appellation Controlee. The fact that its name is easy for foreigners to pronounce also helped. 130,000 cases produced from 337 hectares makes it the second biggest area by production after Beaune. 135 hectares of that is Premier Cru, of which Les Epenots and Les Rugiens are the most notable.

Pommard produces purely red wine - no whites.

== Village ==
The square bell tower of its eighteenth-century church, characterise the village and on the hills that surround Pommard, the vineyards dominate the landscape.

== International relations ==
Pommard is twinned with Nackenheim, Germany

== See also ==
- Communes of the Côte-d'Or department
- Côte de Beaune
