= Ébaty =

- Commune
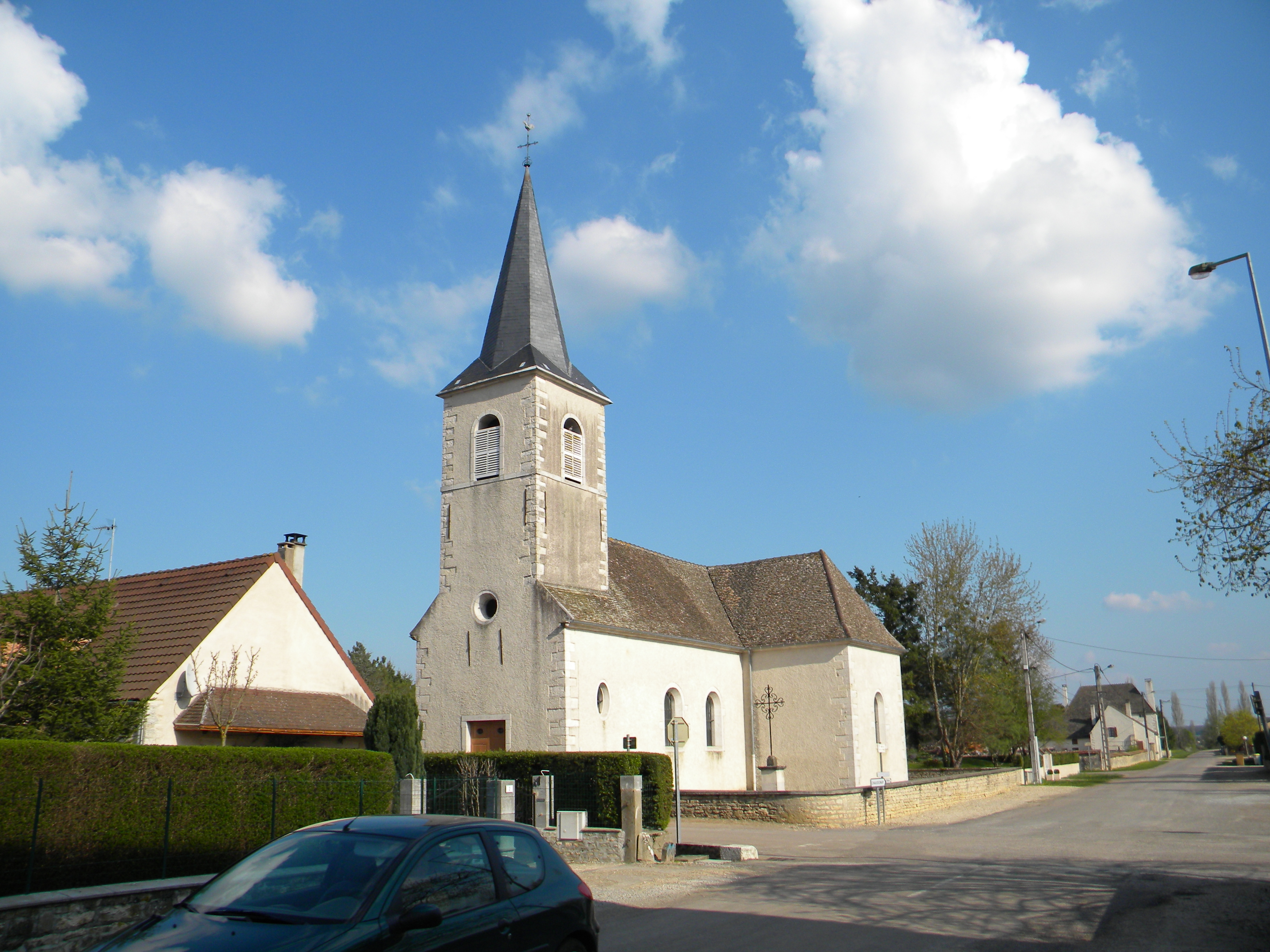
- The church in Ébaty
- Location of Ébaty
- Location within France Location within Bourgogne-Franche-Comté
- Coordinates: 46°55′48″N 4°47′07″E
- Country: France
- Region: Bourgogne-Franche-Comté
- Department: Côte-d'Or
- Arrondissement: Beaune
- Canton: Ladoix-Serrigny
- Intercommunality: CA Beaune Côte et Sud

Government
  - Mayor (2020–2026): Olivier Athanase
- Area^{1}: 2.13 km^{2} (0.82 sq mi)
- Highest elevation: 212 m (696 ft)
- Lowest elevation: 198 m (650 ft)
- Population (2023): 256
  - Density: 120/km^{2} (311/sq mi)
- Time zone: UTC+01:00 (CET)
  - Summer (DST): UTC+02:00 (CEST)
- INSEE/Postal code: 21236 /21190
- ^{1} French Land Register data, which excludes lakes, ponds, glaciers > 1 km^{2} (0.386 sq mi or 247 acres) and river estuaries.

Ébaty (French pronunciation: [ebati]) is a commune in the Côte-d'Or department in eastern France.

== Population ==
Historical population
Year	Pop.	±% p.a.
1968	92	—
1975	106	+2.04%
1982	143	+4.37%
1990	169	+2.11%
1999	185	+1.01%
2007	211	+1.66%
2012	245	+3.03%
2017	256	+0.88%
2023	256	+0.00%
Source: INSEE

== See also ==
- Communes of the Côte-d'Or department
