= Tailly, Côte-d'Or =

Tailly
- Commune
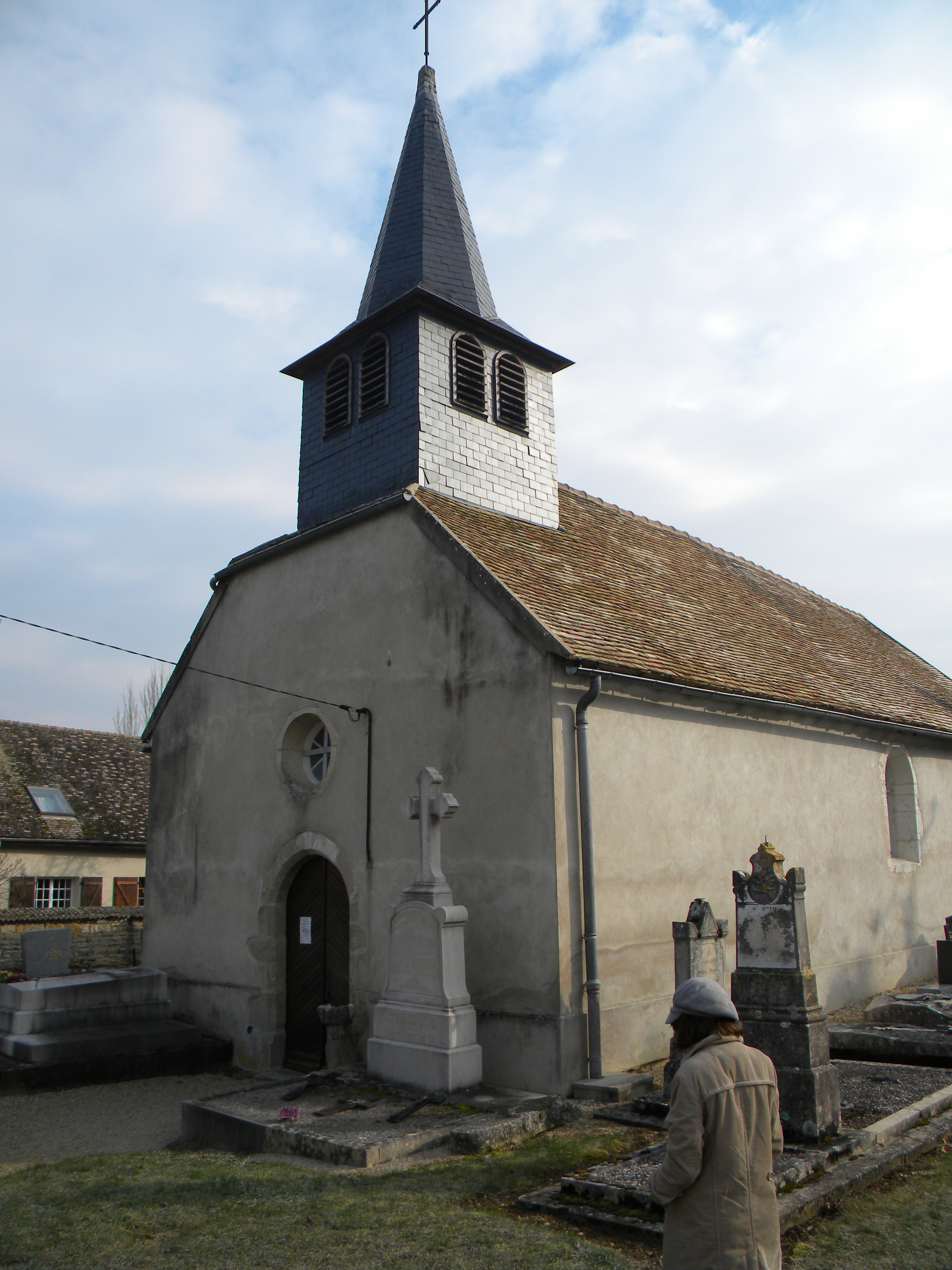
- The church in Tailly

- Coat of arms
- Location of Tailly
- Location within France Location within Bourgogne-Franche-Comté
- Coordinates: 46°58′12″N 4°48′54″E
- Country: France
- Region: Bourgogne-Franche-Comté
- Department: Côte-d'Or
- Arrondissement: Beaune
- Canton: Ladoix-Serrigny
- Intercommunality: CA Beaune Côte et Sud

Government
  - Mayor (2020–2026): Eric Sordet
- Area^{1}: 4.57 km^{2} (1.76 sq mi)
- Highest elevation: 217 m (712 ft)
- Lowest elevation: 196 m (643 ft)
- Population (2023): 201
  - Density: 44.0/km^{2} (114/sq mi)
- Time zone: UTC+01:00 (CET)
  - Summer (DST): UTC+02:00 (CEST)
- INSEE/Postal code: 21616 /21190
- ^{1} French Land Register data, which excludes lakes, ponds, glaciers > 1 km^{2} (0.386 sq mi or 247 acres) and river estuaries.

Tailly (French pronunciation: [taji]) is a commune in the Côte-d'Or department in eastern France.

== Population ==
Historical population
Year	Pop.	±% p.a.
1968	146	—
1975	113	−3.59%
1982	147	+3.83%
1990	189	+3.19%
1999	205	+0.91%
2007	197	−0.50%
2012	190	−0.72%
2017	177	−1.41%
2023	201	+2.14%
Source: INSEE

== See also ==
- Communes of the Côte-d'Or department
