= Bouilland =

- Commune
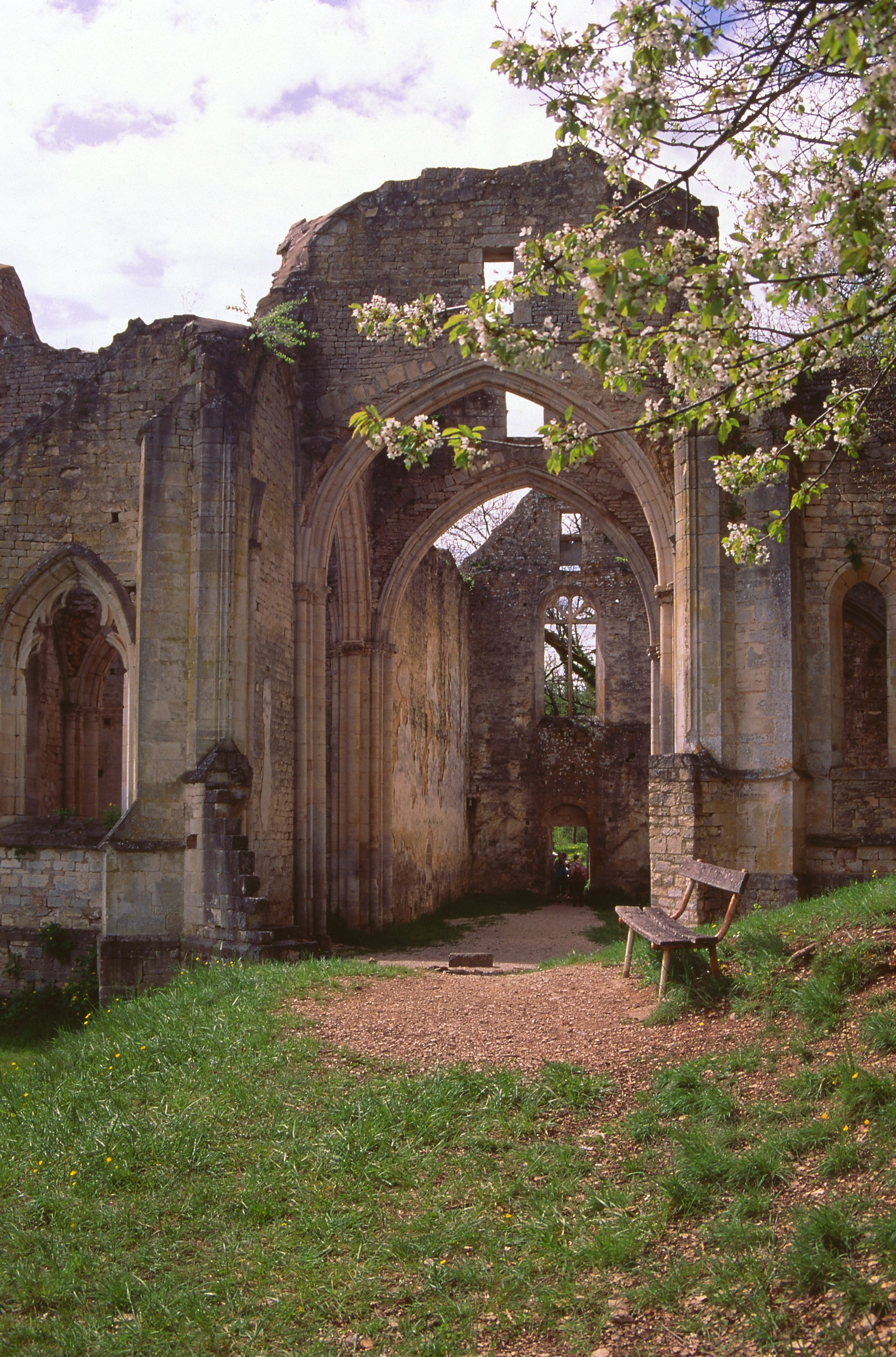
- Sainte-Marguerite Abbey

- Coat of arms
- Location of Bouilland
- Location within France Location within Bourgogne-Franche-Comté
- Coordinates: 47°07′59″N 4°46′38″E
- Country: France
- Region: Bourgogne-Franche-Comté
- Department: Côte-d'Or
- Arrondissement: Beaune
- Canton: Ladoix-Serrigny
- Intercommunality: CA Beaune Côte et Sud

Government
  - Mayor (2020–2026): Jean-Noël Mory
- Area^{1}: 16.65 km^{2} (6.43 sq mi)
- Highest elevation: 620 m (2,030 ft)
- Lowest elevation: 345 m (1,132 ft)
- Population (2023): 245
  - Density: 14.7/km^{2} (38.1/sq mi)
- Time zone: UTC+01:00 (CET)
  - Summer (DST): UTC+02:00 (CEST)
- INSEE/Postal code: 21092 /21420
- ^{1} French Land Register data, which excludes lakes, ponds, glaciers > 1 km^{2} (0.386 sq mi or 247 acres) and river estuaries.

Bouilland (French pronunciation: [bujɑ̃]) is a commune in the Côte-d'Or department in eastern France.

== Population ==
Historical population
Year	Pop.	±% p.a.
1968	165	—
1975	134	−2.93%
1982	136	+0.21%
1990	145	+0.80%
1999	168	+1.65%
2007	193	+1.75%
2012	185	−0.84%
2017	210	+2.57%
2023	245	+2.60%
Source: INSEE

== See also ==
- Communes of the Côte-d'Or department
