= Puligny-Montrachet wine =

Wine appellation from Burgundy, France

Puligny-Montrachet
- Wine region
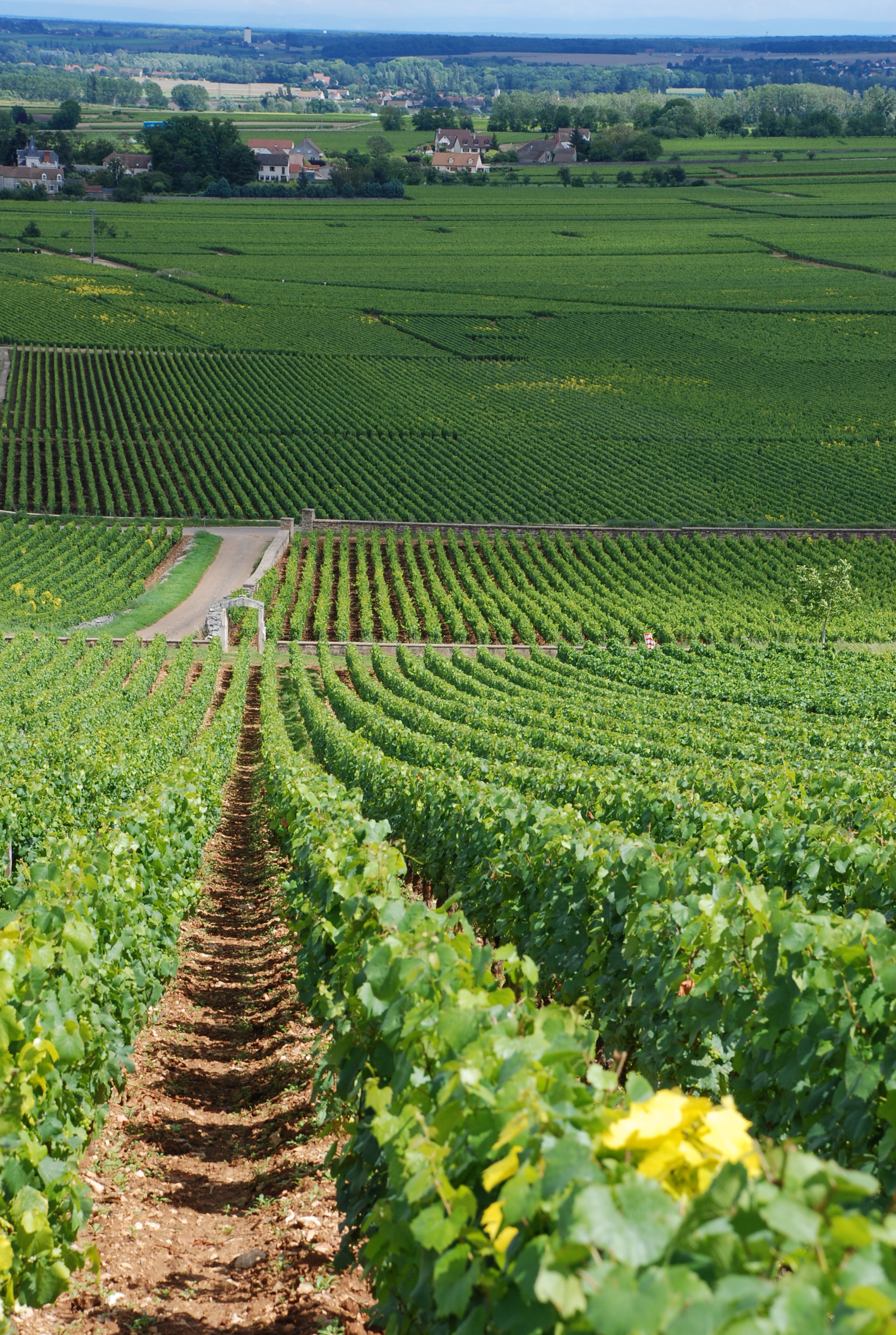
- Vineyards in the southern part of Puligny-Montrachet. Chevalier-Montrachet is in the foreground, Montrachet is center-right, followed by Bâtard-Montrachet and (on the left) Bienvenues-Bâtard-Montrachet. Center-left, a small part of Le Cailleret is visible, and in the distance (in front of the buildings) are some village-level vineyards.
- Country: France
- Size of planted vineyards: 207.98 hectares (513.9 acres), as of 2008
- No. of vineyards: Four Grand Cru vineyards, 17 Premier Cru vineyards
- Grapes produced: Chardonnay, Pinot noir

Puligny-Montrachet wine is produced in the commune of Puligny-Montrachet in Côte de Beaune of Burgundy. The Appellation d'origine contrôlée (AOC) Puligny-Montrachet may be used for white wine and red with respectively Chardonnay and Pinot noir as the main grape variety. However, almost only white Puligny-Montrachet is produced, at around 99.5 per cent of the total production. There are four Grand Cru vineyards within Puligny-Montrachet, with Montrachet the most well-known, and 17 Premier Cru vineyards.

In 2008, there were 207.98 hectares (513.9 acres) of vineyard surface was in production for Puligny-Montrachet wine at village and Premier Cru level, and 10,844 hectolitres of wine was produced, of which 10,792 hectolitres white wine and 52 hectolitres red wine. Some 3.67 hectares (9.1 acres) of this area was used for the red wines in 2007. The amount produced corresponds to slightly fewer than 1.5 million bottles of which slightly fewer than 7,000 bottles were red wine.

For white wines, the AOC regulations allow both Chardonnay and Pinot blanc to be used, but most wines are 100% Chardonnay. The AOC regulations also allow up to 15 per cent total of Chardonnay, Pinot blanc and Pinot gris as accessory grapes in the rare red wines, but this not very often practised. The allowed base yield is 45 hectolitres per hectare for white wine (40 for red wine). The grapes must reach a maturity of at least 11.0 per cent potential alcohol for village-level white wine (10.5 for red) and 11.5 per cent for Premier Cru white wine (11.0 for red).

The style of white Puligny-Montrachet is often very mineral, with a more restrained oak character compared to the white wines of some of the other Côte de Beaune villages, and tends to be described as "elegant" rather than fruit-driven, although some aspects of the style (such as the level of fruitiness) varies somewhat between producers and specific vineyards.

== Grands Crus ==
There are four Grand Cru vineyards located in the southern part of Puligny-Montrachet, bordering on Chassagne-Montrachet. Montrachet and Bâtard-Montrachet cross the communal border and are shared with Chassagne-Montrachet, totaling respectively 7.99 hectares (19.7 acres) and 11.24 hectares (27.8 acres) of vineyards in 2008. Bienvenues-Bâtard-Montrachet, 3.53 hectares (8.7 acres), and Chevalier-Montrachet, 7.47 hectares (18.5 acres), are located entirely within Puligny-Montrachet.

== Premiers Crus ==
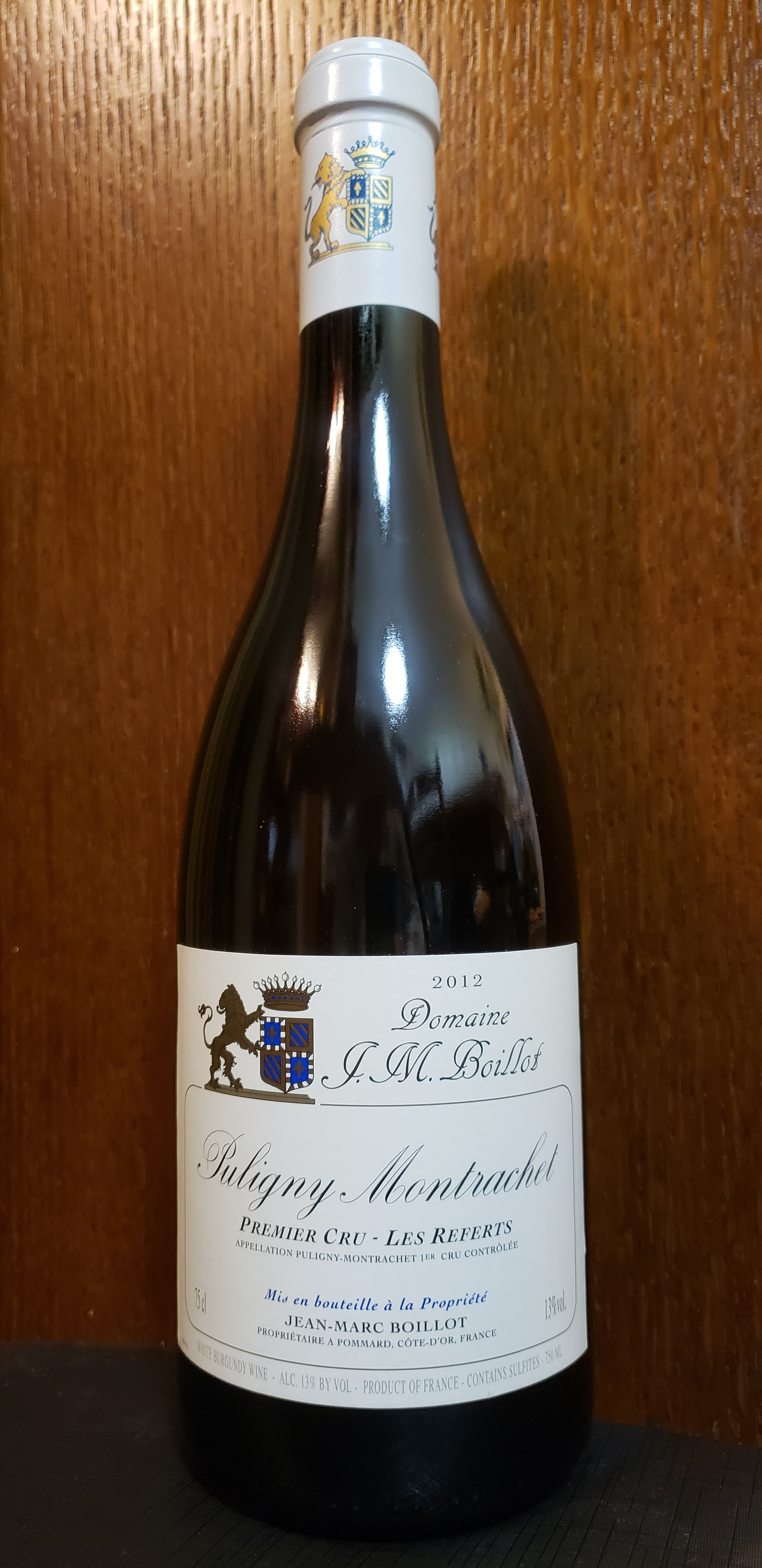
A Premier Cru from the appellation

There are 19 climats in Puligny-Montrachet classified as Premier Cru vineyards, located both to the south of the village, in the Chassagne-Montrachet direction, and to the north, in the Meursault direction. Their wines are designated Puligny-Montrachet Premier Cru + vineyard name, such as Puligny-Montrachet Premier Cru Les Folatières, or may be labelled just Puligny-Montrachet Premier Cru, in which case it is possible to blend wine from several Premier Cru vineyards within the AOC.

In 2007, 88.65 hectares (219.1 acres) of the total Puligny-Montrachet vineyard surface consisted of Premier Cru vineyards, of which 87.61 hectares (216.5 acres) white and 1.04 hectares (2.6 acres) red Puligny-Montrachet Premier Cru. The annual production of Premier Cru wine, as a five-year average, is 4,597 hectolitres of white wine and 63 hectolitres of red wine.

The climats classified as Premiers Crus are:

- Sous le Puits (Blagny)
- La Garenne (Blagny)
- Hameau de Blagny (Blagny)
- La Truffière
- Champ Gain
- Les Chalumeaux
- Champ Canet
- Clos de la Garenne
- Les Folatières
- Peux Bois
- Le Cailleret
- Au Chaniot
- Les Pucelles
- Clos Des Meix
- Clavoillon
- Les Perrières
- Clos de la Mouchère
- Les Combettes
- Les Referts

Three climats in the north of the commune, close to the border of Meursault are also entitled to the Blagny AOC, which is used for red wine.
