= Chassagne-Montrachet wine =

Type of wine

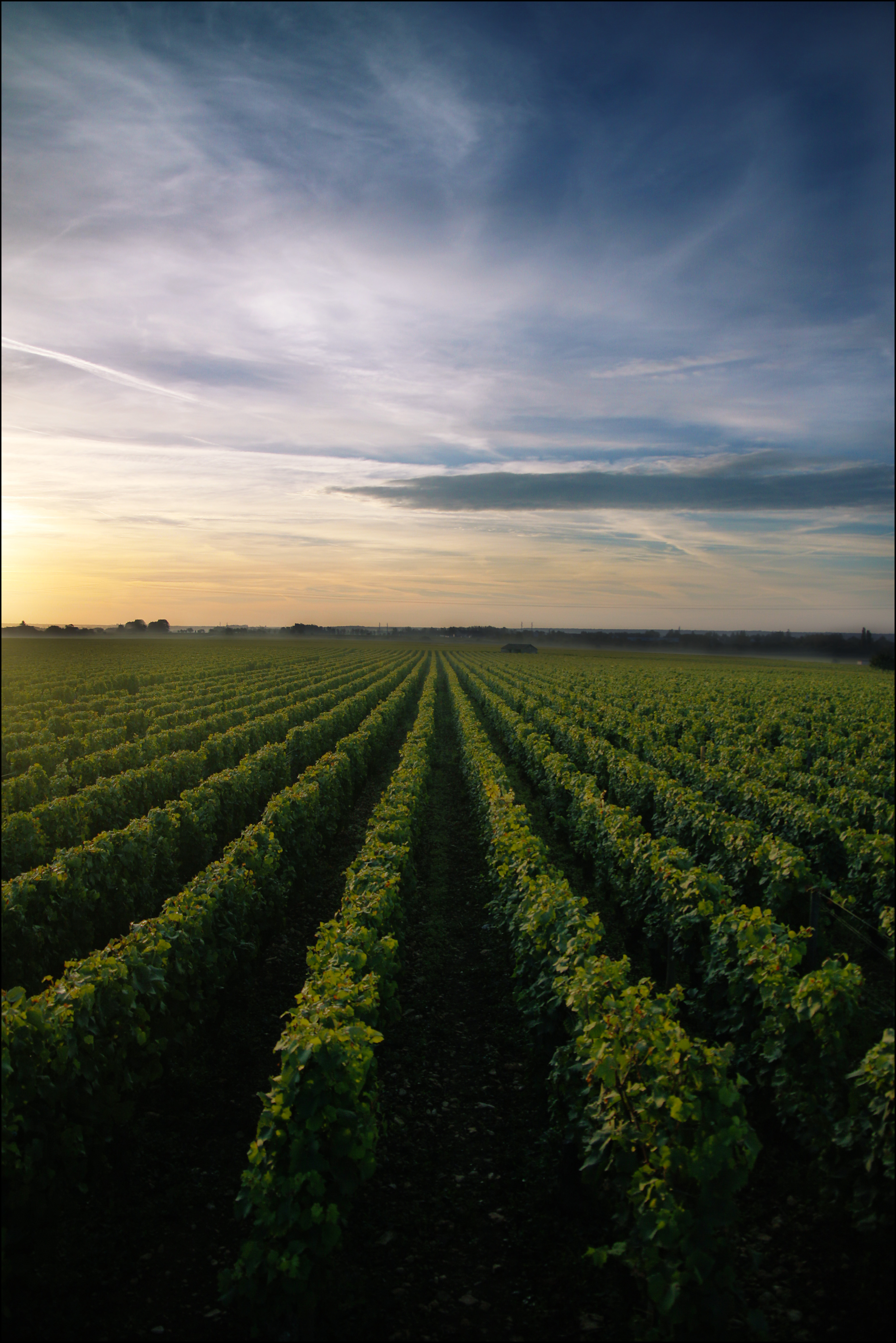
Vineyard of Chassagne-Montrachet

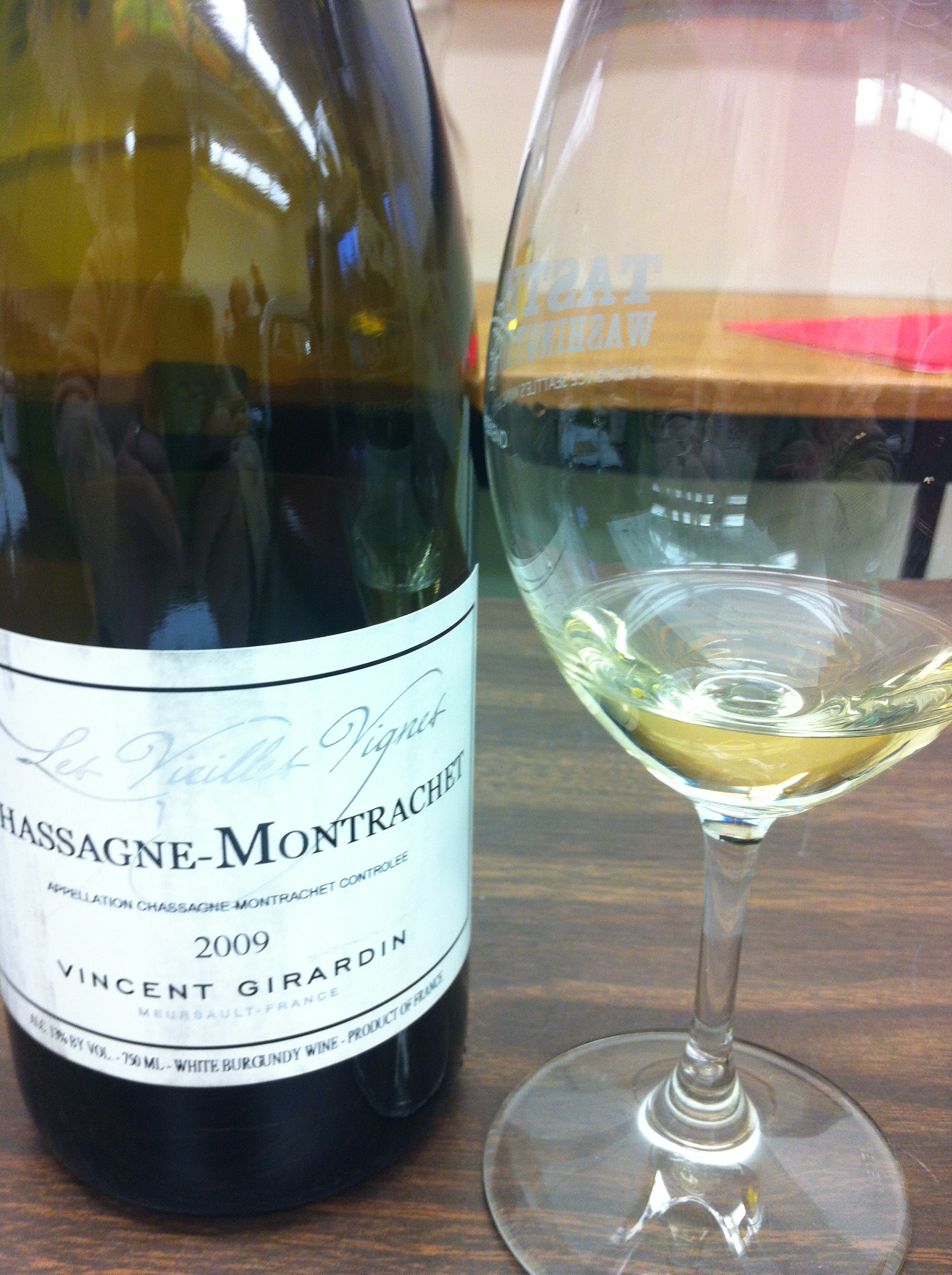
A glass of Chassagne-Montrachet.

Chassagne-Montrachet wine is produced in the communes of Chassagne-Montrachet and Remigny in Côte de Beaune of Burgundy. The Appellation d'origine contrôlée (AOC) Chassagne-Montrachet may be used for white wine and red with respectively Chardonnay and Pinot noir as the main grape variety. The production consists of around two-thirds of white wine and one-third of red wine, which is produced primarily in the southern part of the commune, in the direction of Santenay. There are three Grand Cru vineyards within Chassagne-Montrachet, with Montrachet the most well-known, and 50 Premier Cru vineyards.

In 2008, there were 301.43 hectares (744.8 acres) of vineyard surface in production for Chassagne-Montrachet wine at village and Premier Cru level, and 15,660 hectoliter of wine was produced, of which 10,398 hectoliter white wine and 5,262 hectoliter red wine. Some 121.21 hectares (299.5 acres) of this area was used for the red wines in 2007. The amount produced corresponds to almost 2.1 million bottles, almost 1.4 million bottles of white wine and 700.000 bottles of red wine.

For white wines, the AOC regulations allow both Chardonnay and Pinot blanc to be used, but most wines are 100% Chardonnay. The AOC regulations also allow up to 15 per cent total of Chardonnay, Pinot blanc and Pinot gris as accessory grapes in the red wines, but this not very often practiced. The allowed base yield is 40 hectoliter per hectare of red wine and 45 hectoliter per hectare for white wine. The grapes must reach a maturity of at least 10.5 per cent potential alcohol for village-level red wine, 11.0 per cent for village-level white wine and Premier Cru red wine, and 11.5 per cent for Premier Cru white wine.

The style of white Chassagne-Montrachet is often both fruity and mineral, with the level of oak varying between producers.

== Premiers Crus ==
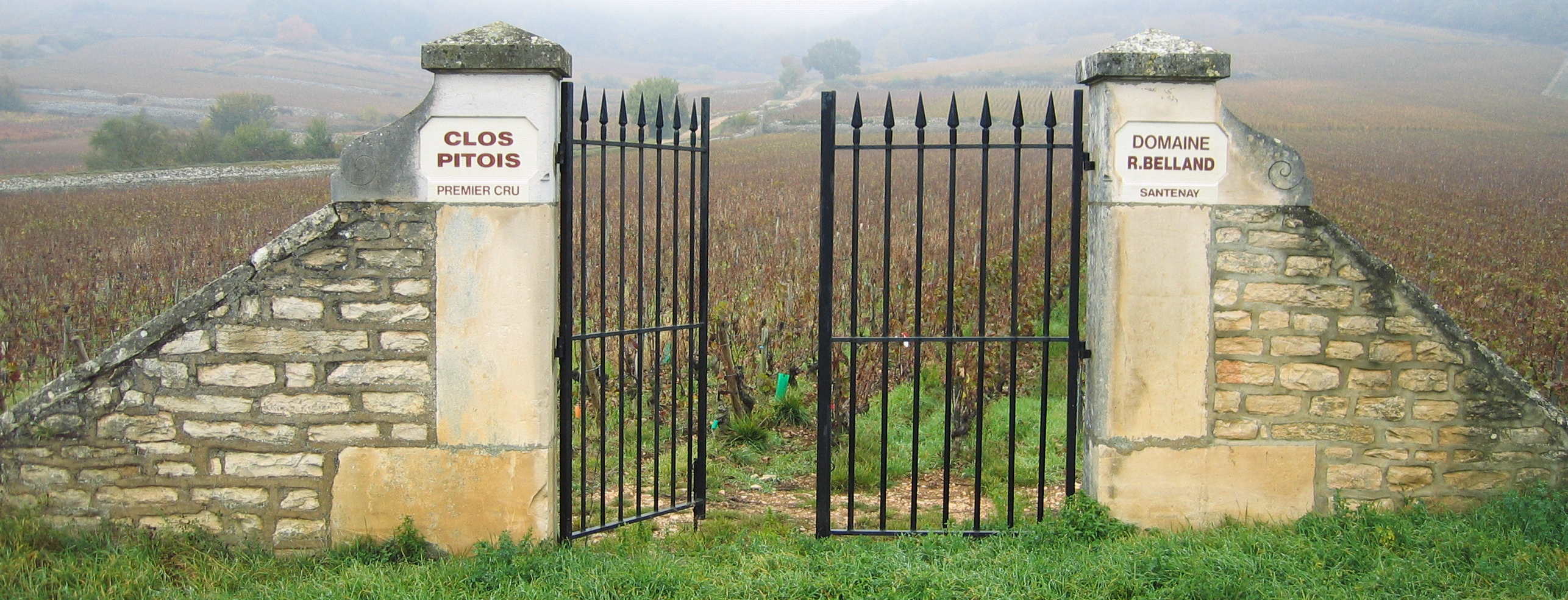
Clos Pitois, a Premier Cru vineyard in the southern part of Chassagne-Montrachet.

There are 48 climats in Chassagne-Montrachet classified as Premier Cru vineyards, located both to the south of the village, in the Santenay direction, and to the north, in the Puligny-Montrachet direction. Their wines are designated Chassagne-Montrachet Premier Cru + vineyard name, such as Chassagne-Montrachet Premier Cru La Maltroie, or may labelled just Chassagne-Montrachet Premier Cru, in which case it is possible to blend wine from several Premier Cru vineyards within the AOC.

In 2007, 144.97 hectares (358.2 acres) of the total Chassagne-Montrachet vineyard surface consisted of Premier Cru vineyards, of which 108.11 hectares (267.1 acres) white and 36.86 hectares (91.1 acres) red Chassagne-Montrachet Premier Cru. The annual production of Premier Cru wine, as a five-year average, is 5,520 hectoliter of white wine and 1,463 hectoliter of red wine.

The climats classified as Premiers Crus are:

- Les Baudines
- Les Embrazées
- Clos Pitois
- La Grande Borne
- Clos Chareau
- Bois de Chassagne
- Tête du Clos
- Francemont
- Les Brussonnes
- Les Boirettes
- La Romanée
- Les Grand Clos
- Morgeot (Produce Reds)
- Abbaye de Morgeot
- Les Petit Clos
- Vigne Blanche
- La Roquemaure
- Ez Crottes
- Guerchère
- Grandes Ruchottes
- Les Petites Fairendes
- Les Fairendes
- La Boudriotte (Produce Reds)
- Les Chaumes
- Champs Jendreau
- En Virondot
- En Cailleret
- Vigne Derrière
- Les Champs Gain
- Les Combards
- Chassagne
- Chassagne du Clos St-Jean
- Les Murées
- Ez Crets
- La Maltroie
- Clos Saint-Jean (Produce Reds)
- Les Rebichets
- Les Places
- Les Charmées
- Petingerets
- Les Vergers
- Les Pasquelles
- Les Chenevottes
- Les Macherelles
- Les Bondues
- Les Commes
- Blanchot Dessus
- En Remilly

== Grands Crus ==
There are three Grand Cru vineyards located in the northern part of Chassagne-Montrachet, bordering on Puligny-Montrachet. Montrachet and Bâtard-Montrachet cross the communal border and are shared with Puligny-Montrachet, totalling respectively 7.99 hectares (19.7 acres) and 11.24 hectares (27.8 acres) of vineyards in 2008. Criots-Bâtard-Montrachet, 1.57 hectares (3.9 acres), is located entirely within Chassagne-Montrachet.
