= Saint-Aubin wine =

Coordinates: 46.9542°N 4.7172°E

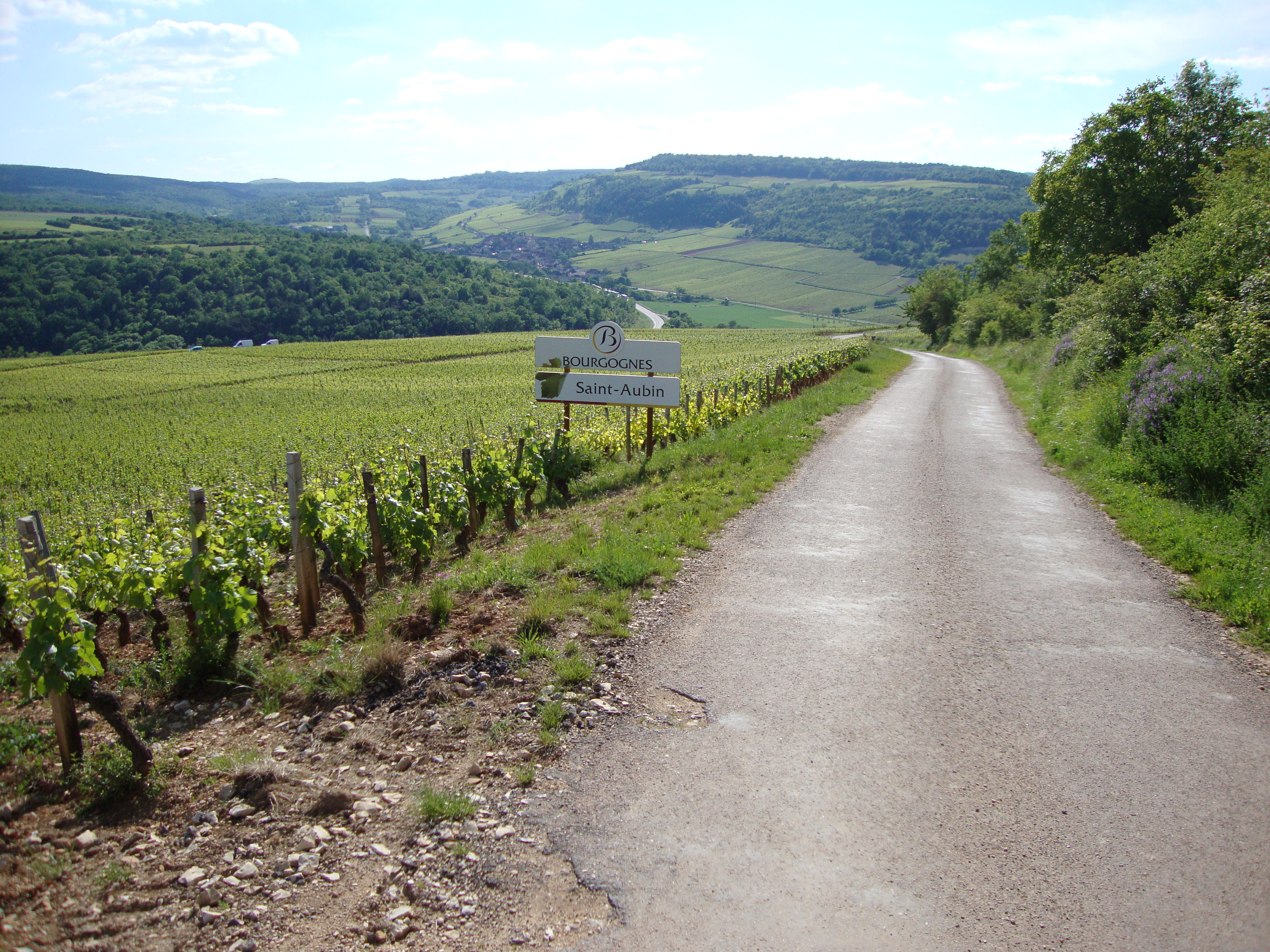
Vineyards in Saint-Aubin

Saint-Aubin wine is produced in the commune of Saint-Aubin in Côte de Beaune of Burgundy. Rather than being situated on the main Côte d'Or escarpment, as most of the other Côte de Beaune wine villages, the vineyards of Saint-Aubin are mainly located in a side valley to the west of Chassagne-Montrachet. The Appellation d'origine contrôlée (AOC) Saint-Aubin may be used for white and red wine with respectively Chardonnay and Pinot noir as the main grape variety. The production consists of around 75% white wine, and 25% red wine. There are no Grand Cru vineyards within the Saint-Aubin AOC.

In 2008, there was 162.81 hectares (402.3 acres) of vineyard surface in production for Saint-Aubin wine at village and Premier Cru level, and 8,264 hectoliter of wine was produced, of which 6,247 hectoliter white wine and 2,017 hectoliter red wine. Some 49.38 hectares (122.0 acres) of this area was used for the red wines in 2007. The total amount produced corresponds to around 1.1 million bottles, of which just over 800,000 bottles of white wine and just over 300,000 bottles of red wine.

For white wines, the AOC regulations allow both Chardonnay and Pinot blanc to be used, but most wines are 100% Chardonnay. The AOC regulations also allow up to 15 per cent total of Chardonnay, Pinot blanc and Pinot gris as accessory grapes in the red wines, but this not very often practiced. The allowed base yield is 40 hectoliter per hectare of red wine and 45 hectoliter per hectare for white wine. The grapes must reach a maturity of at least 10.5 per cent potential alcohol for village-level red wine, 11.0 per cent for village-level white wine and Premier Cru red wine, and 11.5 per cent for Premier Cru white wine.

== Premiers Crus ==
There are 20 climats in Saint-Aubin classified as Premier Cru vineyards. One group of vineyards in the eastern part of the commune is contiguous with Premier Cru vineyards of Chassagne-Montrachet, and continue up a south-facing slope situated a little to the west of the Montrachet vineyard. Another group is situated on an east-facing slope in the side valley, forming a band immediately above the village of Saint-Aubin itself. The village of Gamay is situated between these two groups of vineyards.

The wines of these vineyards are designated Saint-Aubin Premier Cru + vineyard name, or may labelled just Saint-Aubin Premier Cru, in which case it is possible to blend wine from several Premier Cru vineyards within the AOC.

In 2007, 127.48 hectares (315.0 acres) of the total Saint-Aubin vineyard surface consisted of Premier Cru vineyards, of which 94.98 hectares (234.7 acres) white and 32.50 hectares (80.3 acres) red Saint-Aubin Premier Cru. The annual production of Premier Cru wine, as a five-year average, is 4,239 hectoliter of white wine and 1,489 hectoliter of red wine.

The climats classified as Premiers Crus are:

- Derrière la Tour
- En Créot
- Les Champlots
- Sur Gamay
- La Chatenière
- En Remilly
- Les Murgers des Dents de Chien
- Les Combes
- Le Charmois
- Village
- Les Castets
- Derrière chez Édouard
- Le Puits
- Sur le Sentier du Clou
- Les Frionnes
- Sous Roche Dumay
- Vignes Moingeon
- Pitangeret
- Les Perrières
- Les Cortons
