= Blagny AOC =

Blagny is an appellation d'origine contrôlée (AOC) for red wine from Pinot noir produced in the communes of Meursault and Puligny-Montrachet in Côte de Beaune of Burgundy. The appellation only covers seven Premier Cru-classed climats in the two communes, and takes its name from a small village in Puligny-Montrachet situated just on the commune border to Meursault. The AOC was created in 1970.

In 2008, there were 4.66 hectares (11.5 acres) of vineyard surface in production for Blagny AOC, and 164 hectoliter of wine was produced, corresponding to just under 22,000 bottles.

The AOC regulations allow up to 15 per cent total of Chardonnay, Pinot blanc and Pinot gris as accessory grapes in the red wines, but this not very often practiced. The allowed base yield is 40 hectoliter per hectare and the grapes must reach a maturity of at least 10.5 per cent potential alcohol for village-level wine and 11.0 per cent Premier Cru wine.

The seven climats of Blagny AOC are:

- In Meursault: La Jeunelotte, La Pièce sous le Bois, Sous le Dos d’Ane, Sous Blagny.
- In Puligny-Montrachet: Sous le Puits, La Garenne (or Sur la Garenne), Hameau de Blagny.

White wines from these vineyards are entitled to the Meursault Premier Cru or Puligny-Montrachet Premier Cru designation, depending on in which commune they are situated, while red wines from these vineyards may only be designated Blagny Premier Cru. While all vineyards within Blagny are entitled to the Blagny Premier Cru designation, it is also possible to produce village-level Blagny.
