= Chevalier-Montrachet =

French wine region and vineyard

Coordinates: 46°56′47″N 4°44′14″E

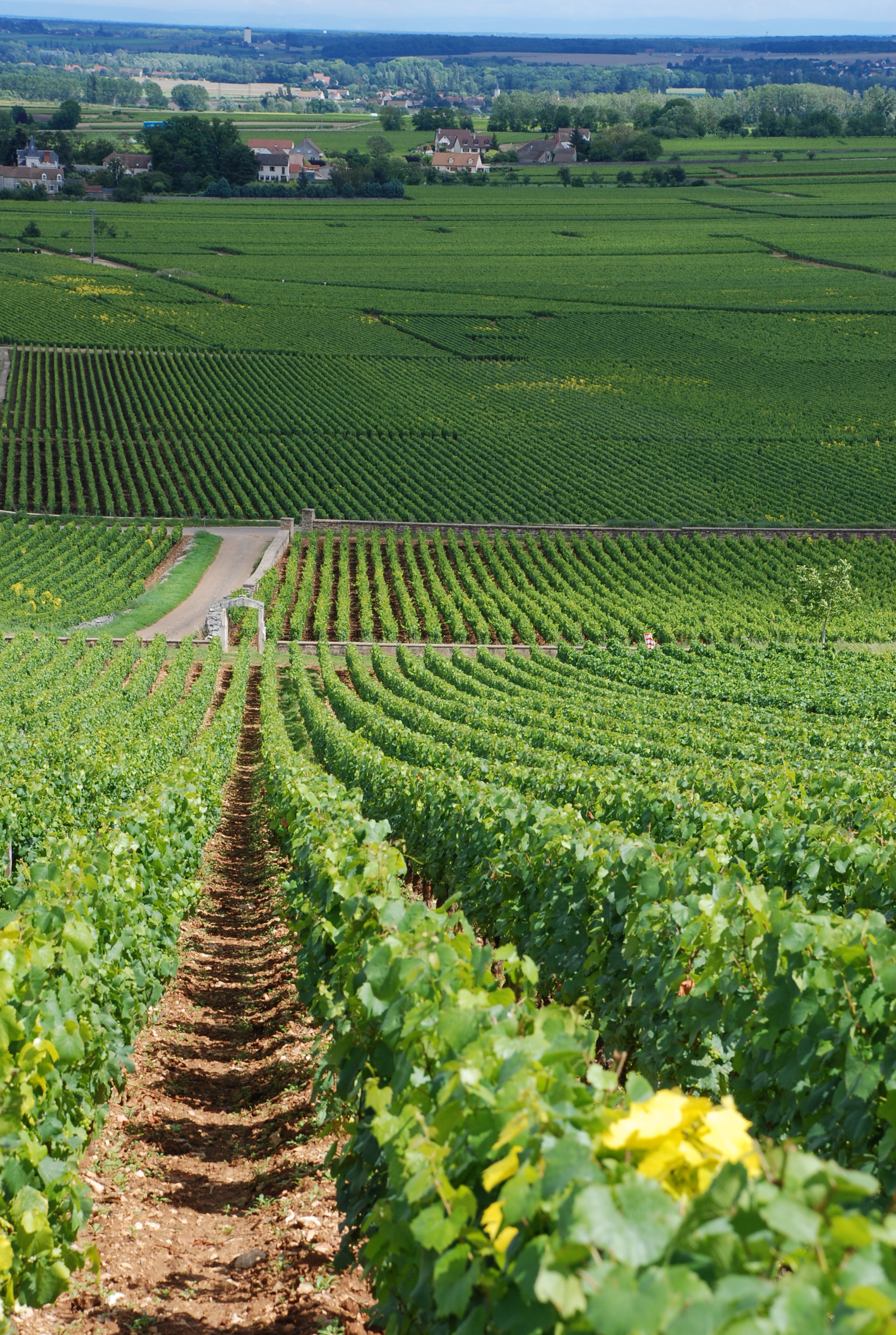
View from the hillside vineyard of Chevalier-Montrachet down to Montrachet with Batard-Montrachet at the bottom. In the background is the community of Puligny-Montrachet

Chevalier-Montrachet is an Appellation d'origine contrôlée (AOC) and Grand Cru vineyard for white wine from Chardonnay in the Côte de Beaune subregion of Burgundy. It is located within the commune of Puligny-Montrachet. Bâtard-Montrachet borders the Grand Cru vineyard Montrachet and the Puligny-Montrachet Premier Cru vineyard Le Cailleret in the east. In terms of the Côte d'Or hillside, Chevalier-Montrachet is located above Montrachet and is located highest of the five "Montrachet" vineyards. The AOC was created in 1937.

== Etymology ==
The name derives from the Medieval legend that the Lord of Puligny divided his land between his eldest son ("le chevalier", the knight), his daughters ("les pucelles", the maidens) and his illegitimate son ("le bâtard", the bastard) : "Chevalier", "Bâtard" and "Les Pucelles" became three different plots within the commune of Puligny-Montrachet.

== Production ==
In 2008, 7.47 hectares (18.5 acres) of vineyard surface were in production within the AOC, and 311 hectoliters of wine were produced, corresponding to just over 41,000 bottles.

== AOC regulations ==
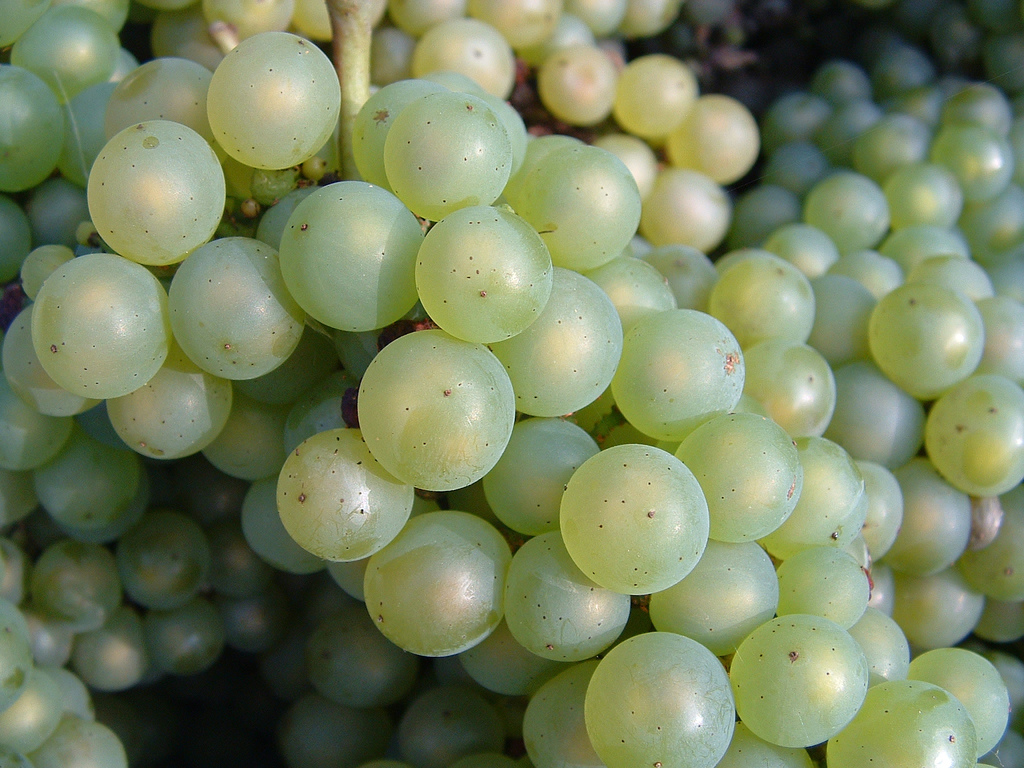
Chardonnay

The only grape variety allowed for Chevalier-Montrachet is Chardonnay, unlike other white Burgundy wines, where up to 15% Pinot Blanc may be added. The allowed base yield is 40 hectoliters per hectare, and the minimum grape maturity is 12.0 percent potential alcohol.

== See also ==
- List of Burgundy Grand Crus
