= Criots-Bâtard-Montrachet =

Wine label in Bourgogne, France

Coordinates: 46°56′29″N 4°44′16″E

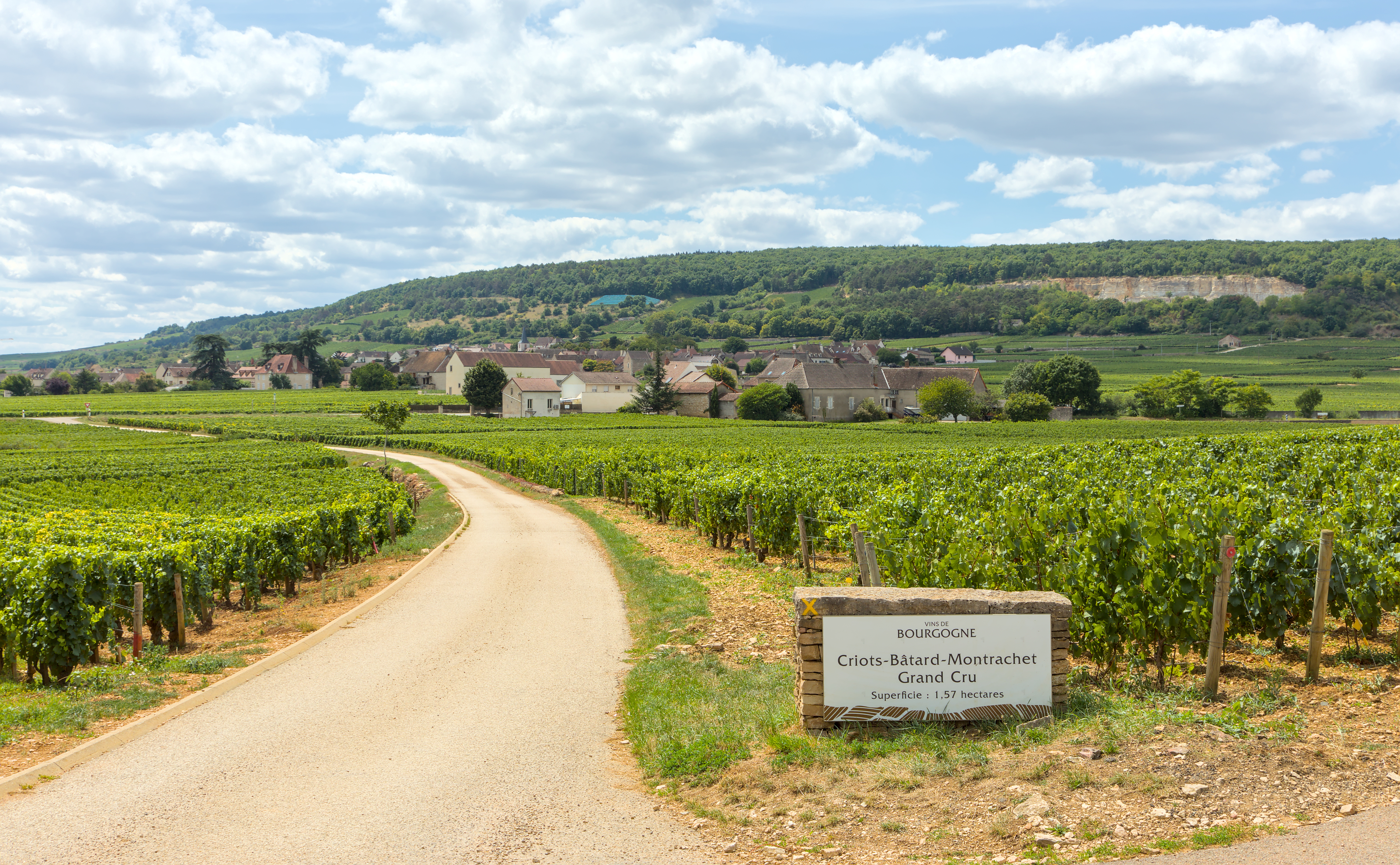
Criots-Bâtard-Montrachet Grand Cru vineyard, with the village of Chassagne-Montrachet in the background.

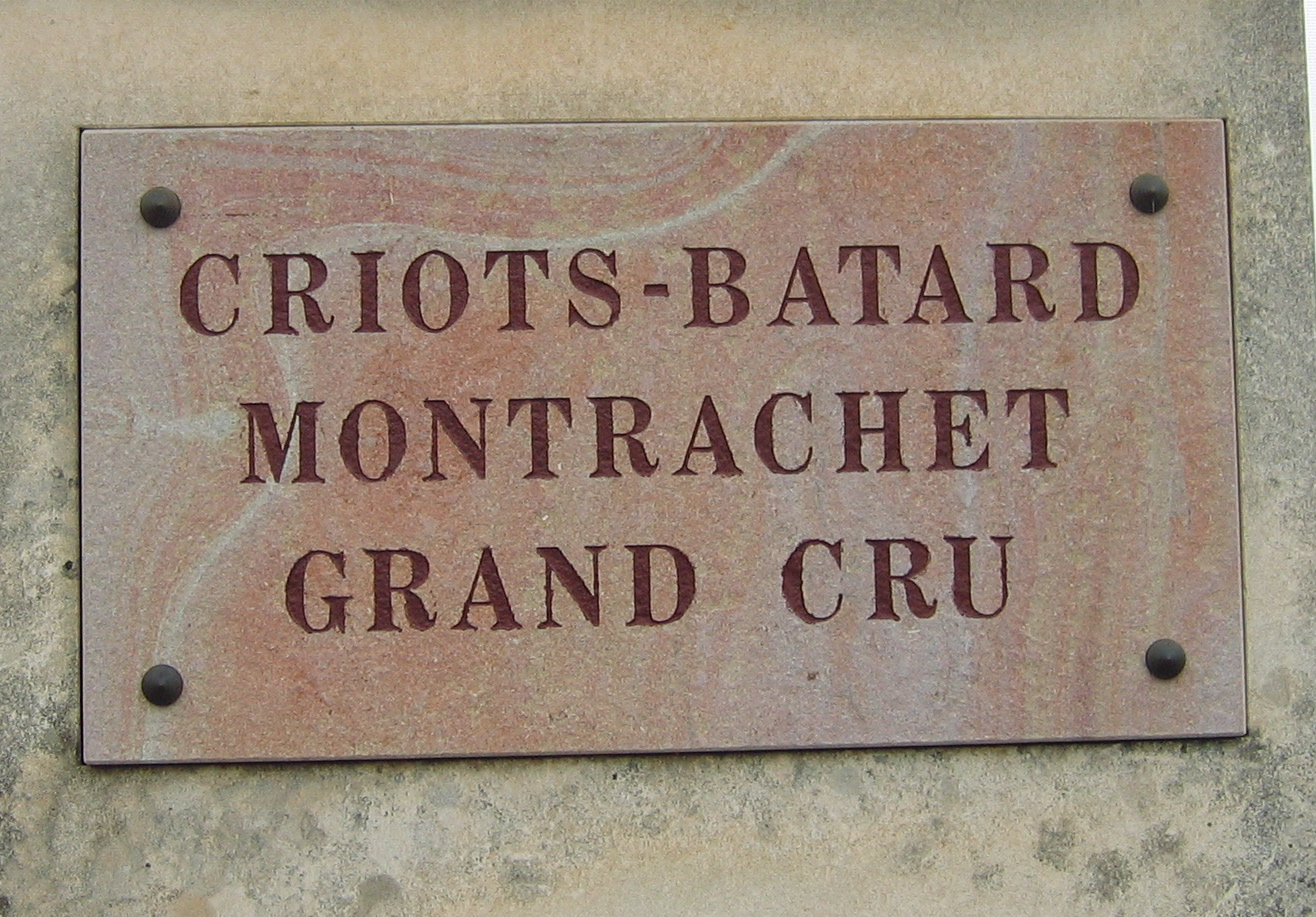
A vineyard sign in Criots-Bâtard-Montrachet

Criots-Bâtard-Montrachet is an Appellation d'origine contrôlée (AOC) and Grand Cru vineyard for white wine from Chardonnay in the Côte de Beaune subregion of Burgundy. It is located within the commune of Chassagne-Montrachet. Criots-Bâtard-Montrachet borders on the Grand Cru vineyard Bâtard-Montrachet in the north, on the Chassagne-Montrachet Premier Cru vineyard Blanchot Dessus in the west and on village-level Chassagne-Montrachet vineyards in the south and east. The AOC was created in 1937.

== Production ==
In 2008, 1.57 hectares (3.9 acres) of vineyard surface was in production within the AOC, and 73 hectoliter of wine was produced, corresponding to just under 10,000 bottles.

== AOC regulations ==
The only grape variety allowed for Criots-Bâtard-Montrachet is Chardonnay. The allowed base yield is 40 hectoliter per hectare, and the minimum grape maturity is 11.5 per cent potential alcohol.

== See also ==
- List of Burgundy Grand Crus
