= Bienvenues-Bâtard-Montrachet =

Vineyard in Burgundy, France

Coordinates: 46°56′45″N 4°44′32″E

Bienvenues-Bâtard-Montrachet is an Appellation d'origine contrôlée (AOC) and Grand Cru vineyard for white wine from Chardonnay in the Côte de Beaune subregion of Burgundy. It is located within the commune of Puligny-Montrachet. Bienvenues-Bâtard-Montrachet borders on the Grand Cru vineyard Bâtard-Montrachet in the west and south, on the Puligny-Montrachet Premier Cru vineyard Les Pucelles in the north and on village-level Puligny-Montrachet vineyards in the east. The AOC was created in 1937.

== Production ==
In 2008, 3.53 hectares (8.7 acres) of vineyard surface was in production within the AOC, and 146 hectoliter of wine was produced, corresponding to just under 20,000 bottles.

== AOC regulations ==
The only grape variety allowed for Bienvenues-Bâtard-Montrachet is Chardonnay. The allowed base yield is 40 hectoliter per hectare, and the minimum grape maturity is 11.5 per cent potential alcohol.

== See also ==
- List of Burgundy Grand Crus
