= Dheune =

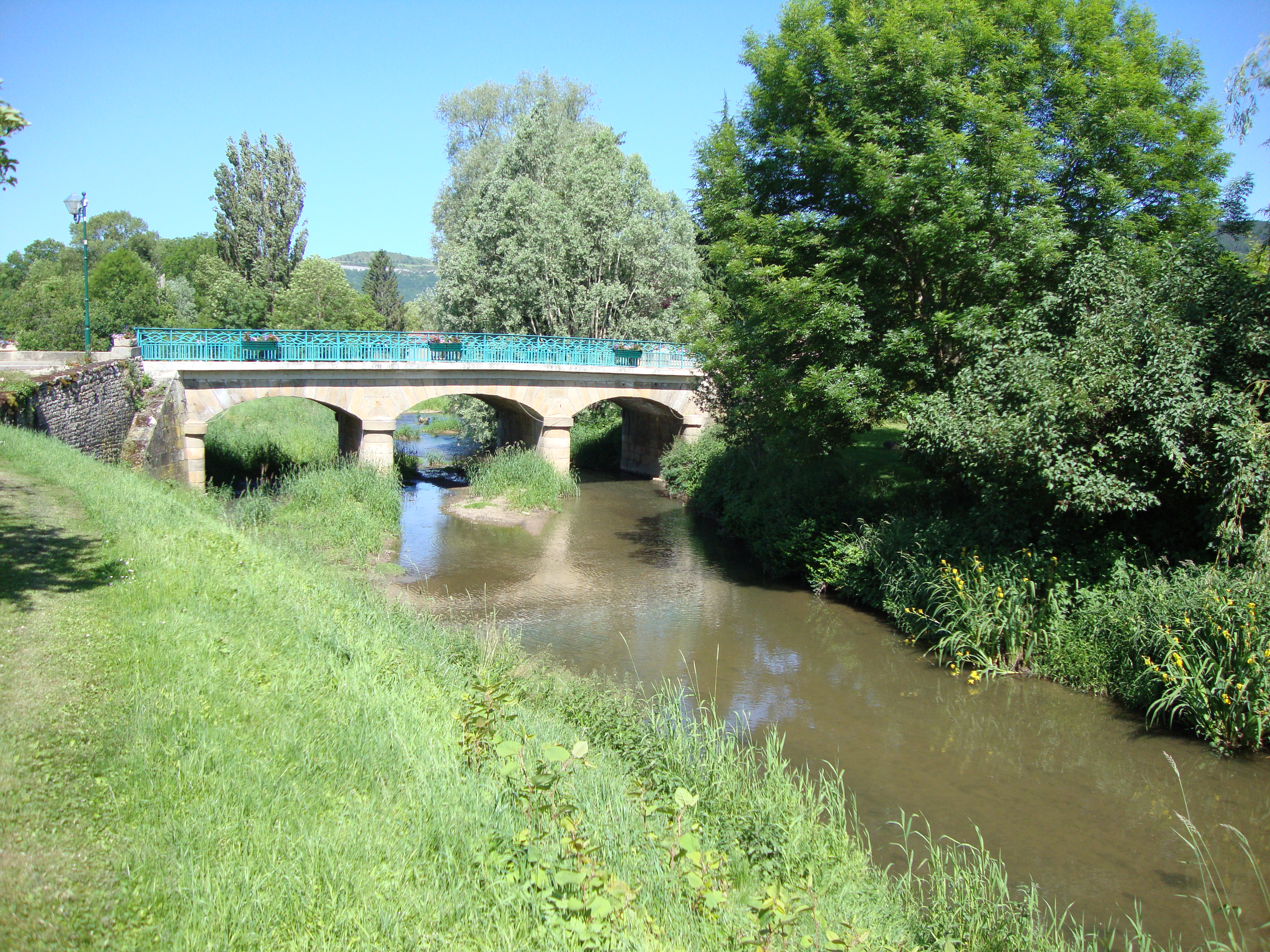
- Bridge over the Dheune at Santenay, Côte-d'Or

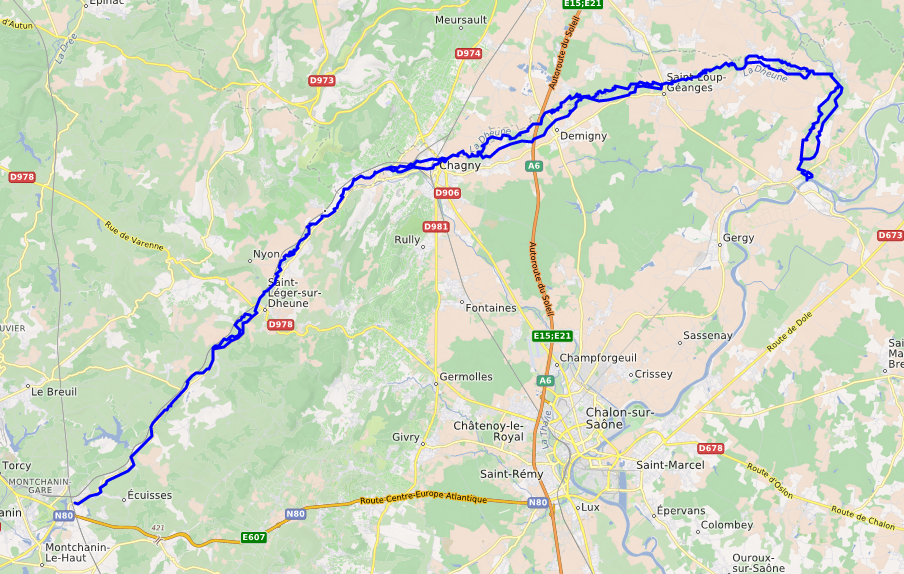

Location
- Country: France

Physical characteristics
- Source
  - location: Burgundy
- Mouth
  - location: Saône
  - coordinates: 46°54′25″N 5°00′27″E
- Length: 71 km (44 mi)

Basin features
- Progression: Saône→ Rhône→ Mediterranean Sea

The Dheune (French pronunciation: [dœn]) is a 71 km long river running through the Côte-d'Or and Saône-et-Loire departments of France. It flows into the Saône at Allerey-sur-Saône.
