= Bâtard-Montrachet =

Vineyard in Côte de Beaune, Burgundy, France

Coordinates: 46°56′37″N 4°44′24″E

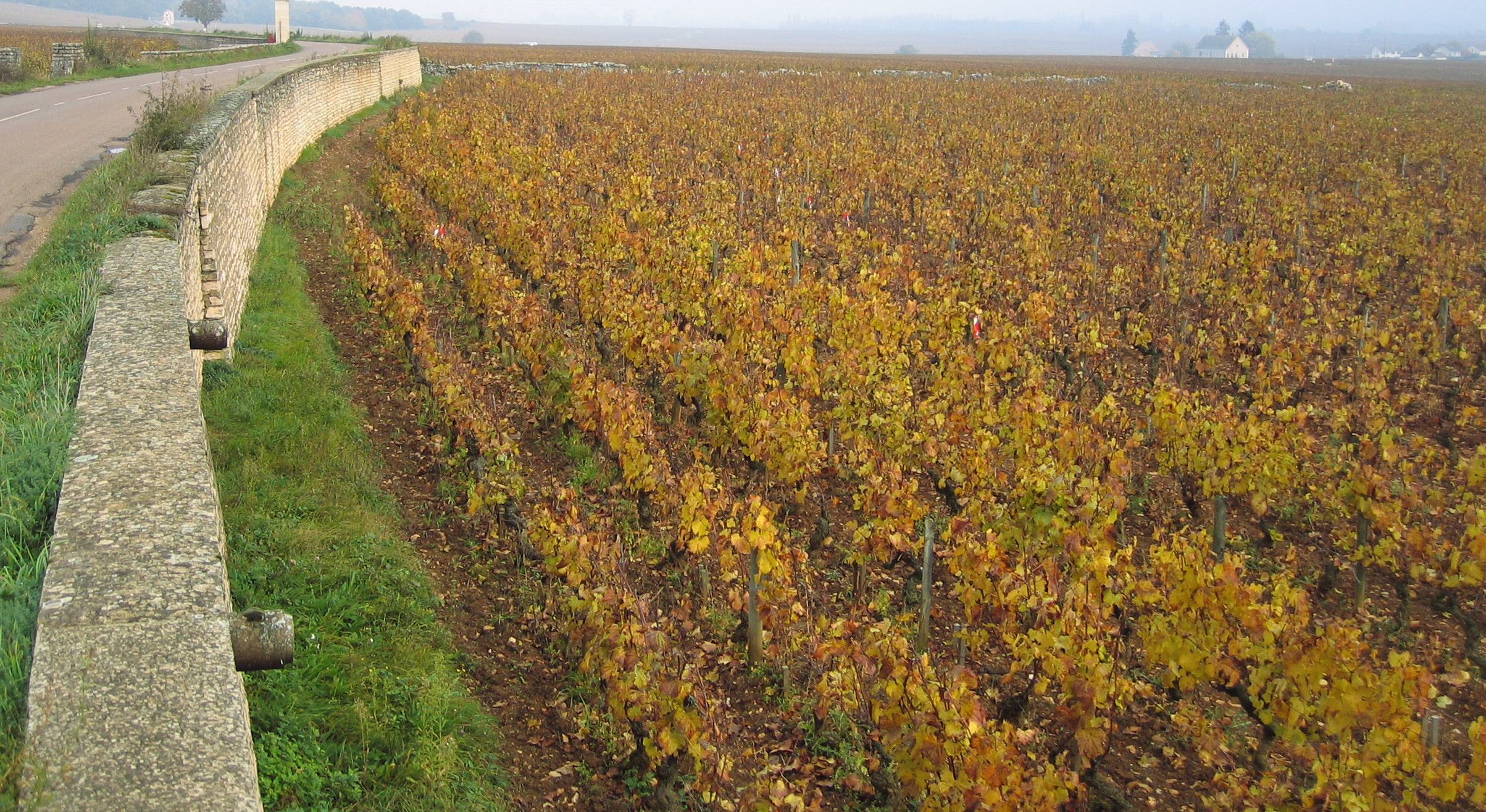
Bâtard-Montrachet in autumn.

Bâtard-Montrachet is an Appellation d'origine contrôlée (AOC) and Grand Cru vineyard for white wine from Chardonnay in the Côte de Beaune subregion of Burgundy. It is located within the communes of Puligny-Montrachet and Chassagne-Montrachet. Bâtard-Montrachet borders on the Grand Cru vineyard Montrachet in the west, on Bienvenues-Bâtard-Montrachet in the east/northeast and on Criots-Bâtard-Montrachet in the south. In terms of the Côte d'Or hillside, Bâtard-Montrachet is located below Montrachet, with the Route des Grands Crus running between the two vineyards. The AOC was created in 1937.

== Etymology ==
The name derives from the Medieval legend that the Lord of Puligny divided his land between his eldest son (le chevalier, the knight), his daughters (les pucelles, the maidens) and his illegitimate son (le bâtard, the bastard) : Chevalier, Bâtard and Les Pucelles became three different plots within the commune of Puligny-Montrachet.

== Production ==
In 2008, 11.24 hectares (27.8 acres) of vineyard surface was in production within the AOC, and 476 hectoliters of wine were produced, corresponding to just over 63,000 bottles.

== AOC regulations ==
The only grape variety allowed per AOC regulations for Bâtard-Montrachet is Chardonnay. The allowed base yield is 40 hectoliters per hectare, and the minimum grape maturity is 11.5% potential alcohol.

== See also ==
- List of Burgundy Grand Crus
