= Montrachet =

Grand Cru vineyard in France

Coordinates: 46°56′40″N 4°44′16″E

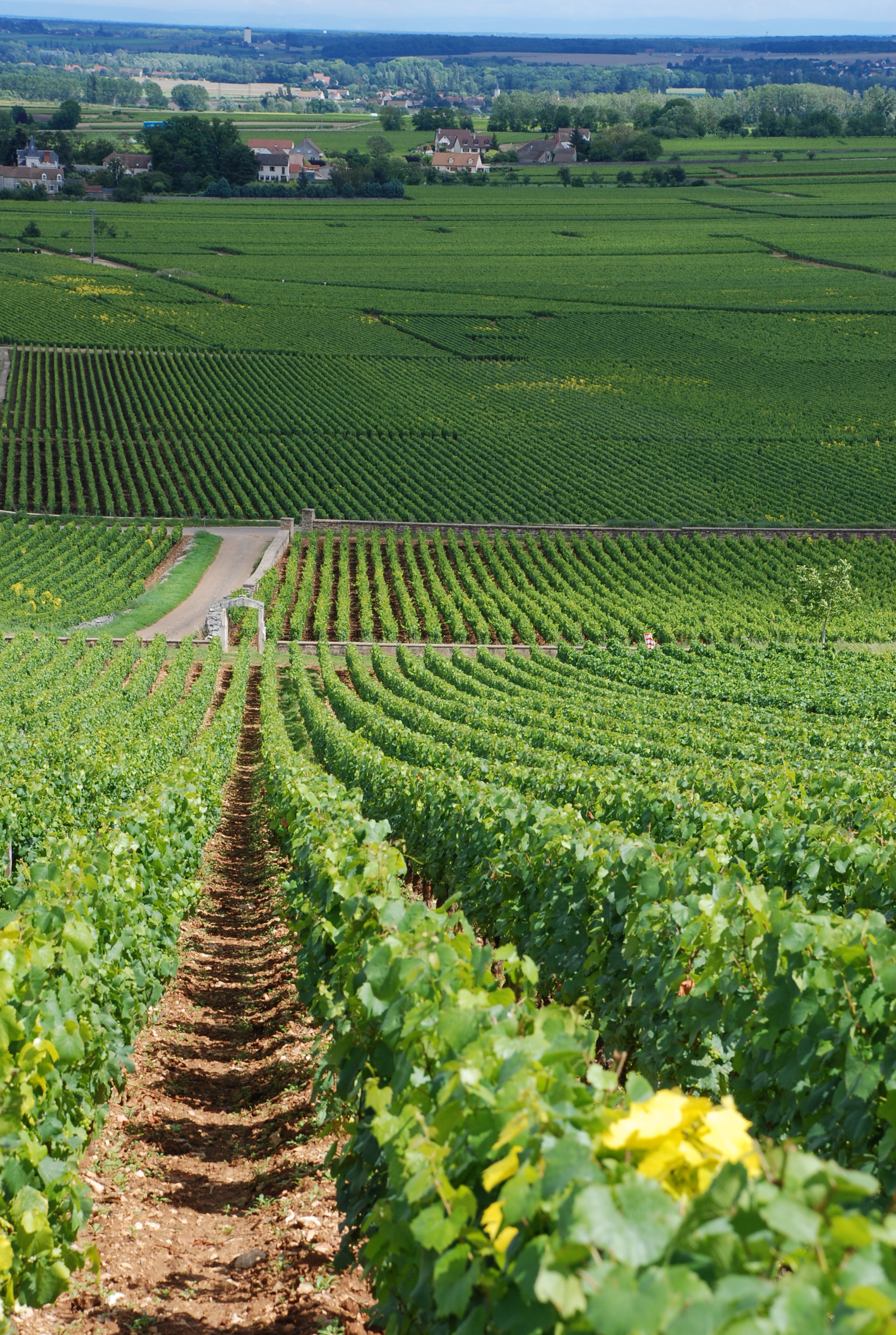
Looking down the vines of Chevalier-Montrachet with Montrachet below and Batard-Montrachet just beyond. The village of Puligny-Montrachet is in the distance.

Montrachet (pronounced Mon-rashay; French pronunciation: [mɔ̃ʁaʃɛ]) is an Appellation d'origine contrôlée (AOC) and Grand Cru vineyard for white wine made of Chardonnay in the Côte de Beaune subregion of Burgundy. It straddles the border between the two communes of Chassagne-Montrachet and Puligny-Montrachet and produces what many consider to be the greatest dry white wine in the world. It is surrounded by four other Grand Cru vineyards all having "Montrachet" as part of their names. Montrachet itself is generally considered superior to its four Grand Cru neighbours, and this is reflected in its higher price.

Montrachet is located in the south of the Côte de Beaune, which is the southern half of the Côte d'Or, which in turn is the most important of the several wine producing subregions of Burgundy.

The Montrachet vineyard is almost equally divided between Puligny-Montrachet and Chassagne-Montrachet. Both of these appellations have, as is customary, appended the name of their most famous vineyard (in this case a shared one) to the name of their main village. The wine from the Chassagne side is usually known as Le Montrachet while the wine from the Puligny side is known as Montrachet.

== History ==
The Montrachet vineyard was first planted in the Middle Ages. Although the date of its establishment is unknown, Pierre and Arnolet de Puligny gifted wines in "Mont Rachaz" to the Abbey of Maizières in 1252.

During the 19th century, Montrachet, along with Burgundy as a whole, was ravaged by a succession of vineyard diseases. In the mid-nineteenth century oidium struck. At the end of the nineteenth century phylloxera struck, eventually overcome by the grafting of European vines on American stock.

The Appellation Controlée system was introduced in Burgundy in 1935. Montrachet and Bâtard-Montrachet (see below) were both recognised as AOC Grands Crus in 1937.

== Production ==
In 2008, 7.99 hectares (19.7 acres) of vineyard surface was in production within the AOC, and 349 hectolitres (9,200 US gal; 7,700 imp gal) of wine was produced, corresponding to just under 47,000 bottles.

== AOC regulations ==
Wines from Montrachet are composed almost entirely of Chardonnay, unlike in other white Burgundy wines, where up to 15% of Pinot Blanc can be added. These are, like most French wines, referred to by their place of origin rather than by grape variety. The allowed base yield of Montrachet is 40 hectolitres per hectare, and the minimum grape maturity is 12.0 per cent potential alcohol.

== Producers ==
There were 18 owners and 26 producers as of October 2007 (an owner can own different subdivisions and/or lease to different producers). The largest owner is the de Laguiche family (an aristocratic family from 1300), which leases its subdivision to Joseph Drouhin. The highest prices are typically charged for Montrachet produced by Domaine de la Romanée-Conti, which owns 0.67 hectares (1.7 acres) and produces around 3,000 bottles per year.

The last sale of a subdivision occurred in 1993 when the Crédit Foncier bank (owner of Château de Puligny) bought 428 m^{2} (4606 sq. ft.) for over half a million Euros.

Montrachet wines are the most expensive dry white wines in the world: prices can range from €150 to €2500 per 75 cl bottle. The price depends on the reputation of the producer (in Burgundy, vineyards are divided among multiple growers, and there can be substantial variation in quality) and the vintage.

== Montrachet and its Grand Cru neighbours ==
Four additional Grand Cru vineyards lie alongside Montrachet and incorporate its name as part of their own; these are Chevalier-Montrachet, which is situated immediately above Montrachet on the slope, Bâtard-Montrachet, which is situated immediately below Montrachet and is separated from it by the Route des Grands Crus, Bienvenues-Bâtard-Montrachet, which is situated immediately beyond Bâtard-Montrachet, in the direction of Puligny-Montrachet, and Criots-Bâtard-Montrachet, which is situated next to Bâtard-Montrachet in the direction of Chassagne-Montrachet. Chevalier-Montrachet and Bienvenues-Bâtard-Montrachet lie entirely within the commune of Puligny-Montrachet. Criots-Bâtard-Montrachet lies entirely within Chassagne-Montrachet. Batard-Montrachet, like Montrachet itself, is split between the two villages.

Grand Cru	Relative position	Vineyard surface (2007)	Average production (2003–2007)
Montrachet	Centre	7.99 hectares (19.7 acres)	310 hl
Bâtard-Montrachet	East	11.09 hectares (27.4 acres)	502 hl
Chevalier-Montrachet	West	7.08 hectares (17.5 acres)	305 hl
Bienvenues-Bâtard-Montrachet	Northeast	3.70 hectares (9.1 acres)	163 hl
Criots-Bâtard-Montrachet	South	1.57 hectares (3.9 acres)	73 hl

== See also ==
- French wine
- List of Burgundy grands crus
