= Santenay, Côte-d'Or =

Santenay
- Commune
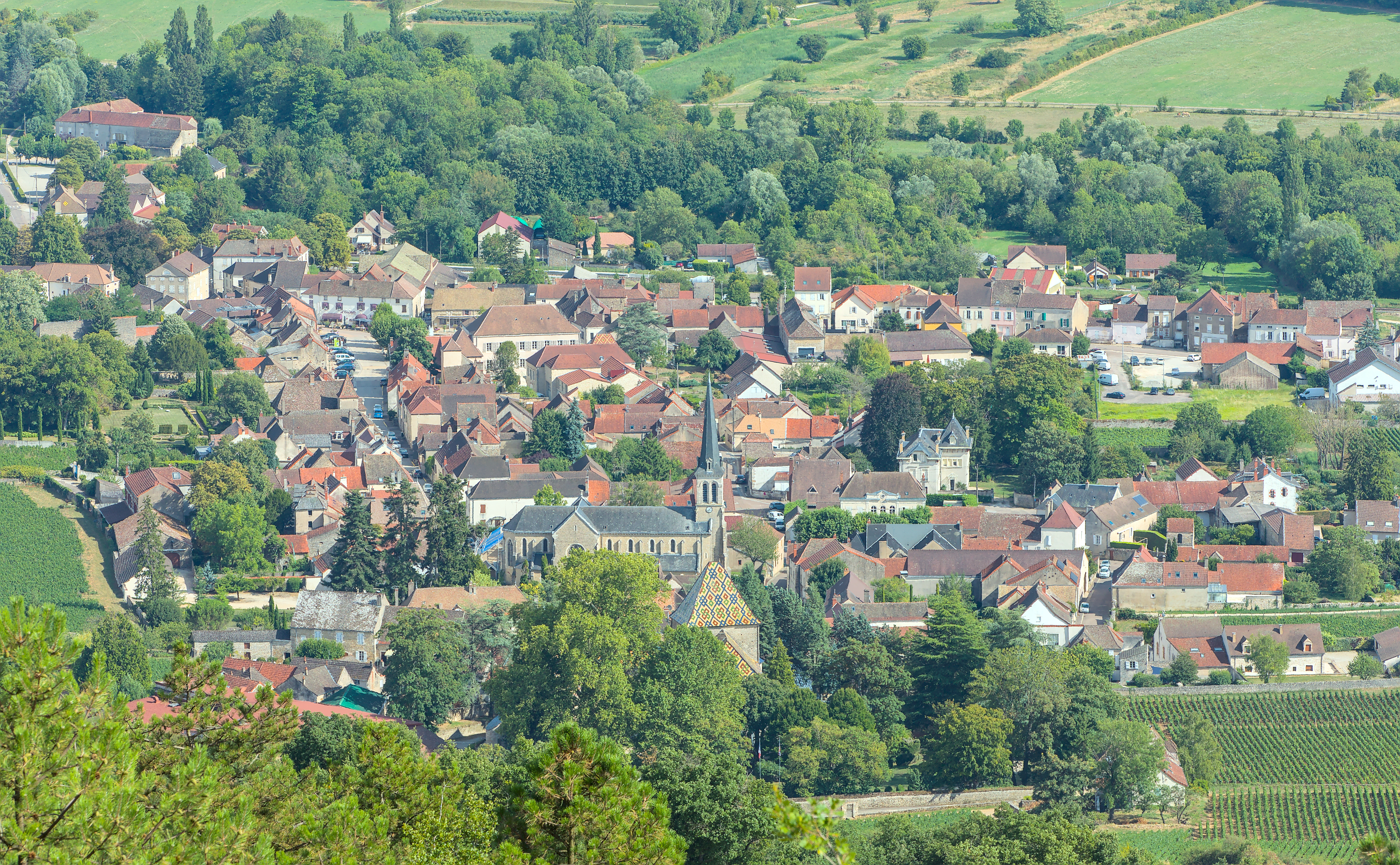
- View of Santenay from Mont de Sène.

- Coat of arms
- Location of Santenay
- Location within France Location within Bourgogne-Franche-Comté
- Coordinates: 46°54′49″N 4°41′53″E
- Country: France
- Region: Bourgogne-Franche-Comté
- Department: Côte-d'Or
- Arrondissement: Beaune
- Canton: Ladoix-Serrigny
- Intercommunality: CA Beaune Côte et Sud

Government
  - Mayor (2020–2026): Guy Vadrot
- Area^{1}: 10.36 km^{2} (4.00 sq mi)
- Elevation: 225 m (738 ft)
- Highest elevation: 522 m (1,713 ft)
- Lowest elevation: 211 m (692 ft)
- Population (2023): 820
  - Density: 79/km^{2} (200/sq mi)
- Time zone: UTC+01:00 (CET)
  - Summer (DST): UTC+02:00 (CEST)
- INSEE/Postal code: 21582 /21590
- ^{1} French Land Register data, which excludes lakes, ponds, glaciers > 1 km^{2} (0.386 sq mi or 247 acres) and river estuaries.

Santenay (French pronunciation: [sɑ̃tnɛ]) is a commune in the Côte-d'Or department in eastern France.

Lying at the southern end of the Côte de Beaune, it is an appellation of Burgundy wine.

== Population ==
Historical population
Year	Pop.	±% p.a.
1968	1,007	—
1975	1,008	+0.01%
1982	1,014	+0.08%
1990	1,008	−0.07%
1999	904	−1.20%
2007	839	−0.93%
2012	859	+0.47%
2017	892	+0.76%
2023	820	−1.39%
Source: INSEE

== Sights ==
Santenay is the location of the chateau of Philip the Bold (1342-1404), Duke of Burgundy. The chateau is open to the public and has its own wine cellars and wine tasting and sale.

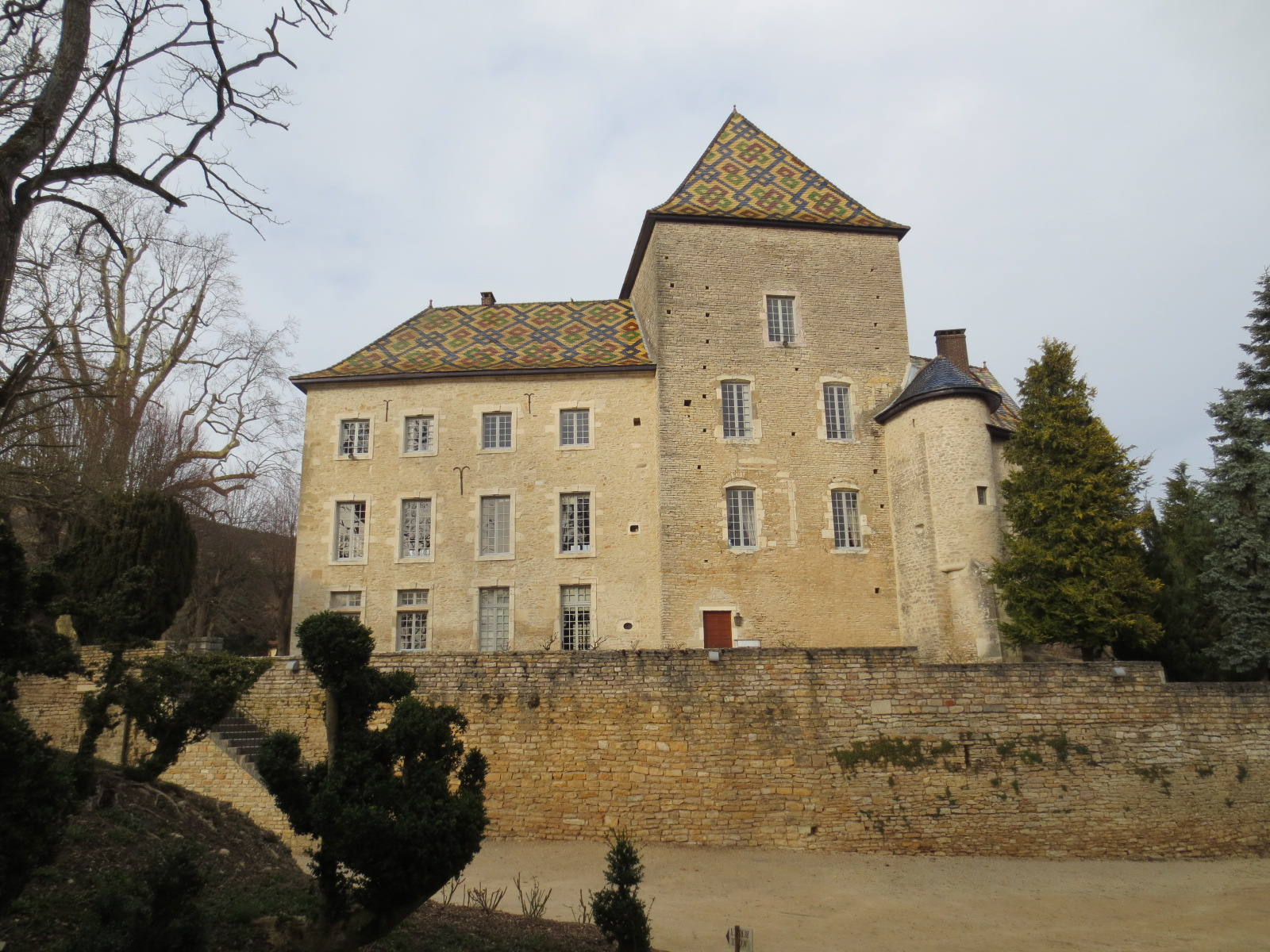
Chateau of Santenay

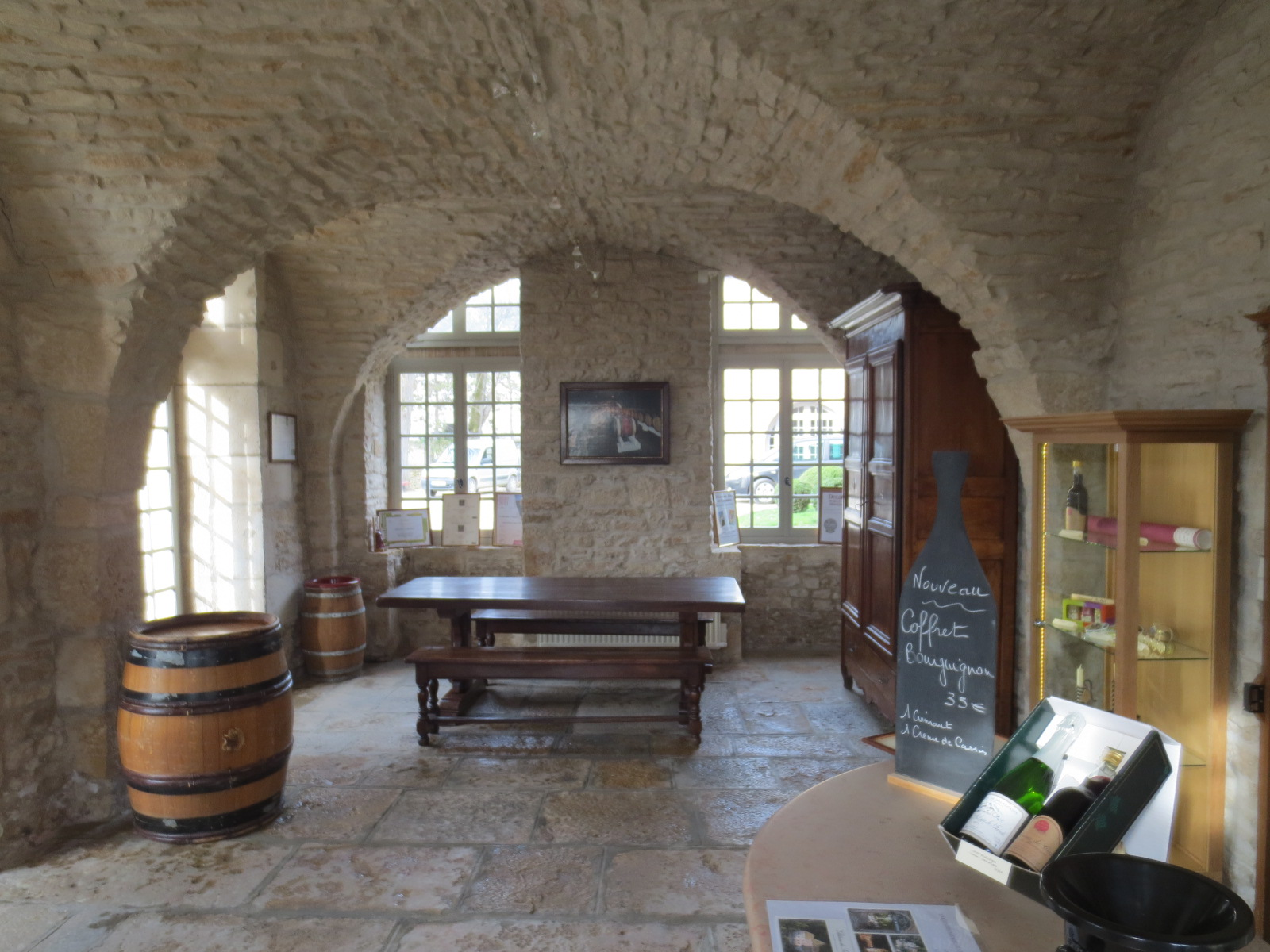
Chateau interior

== Wine ==
Around 85% of the wine from Santenay is red wine made from Pinot noir. The wines are solid, tending more towards the rustic than the elegant, but are cheaper than the big names of the more famous Côte de Beaune villages to the north. Santenay has 124 ha of Premier Crus in its 379ha.

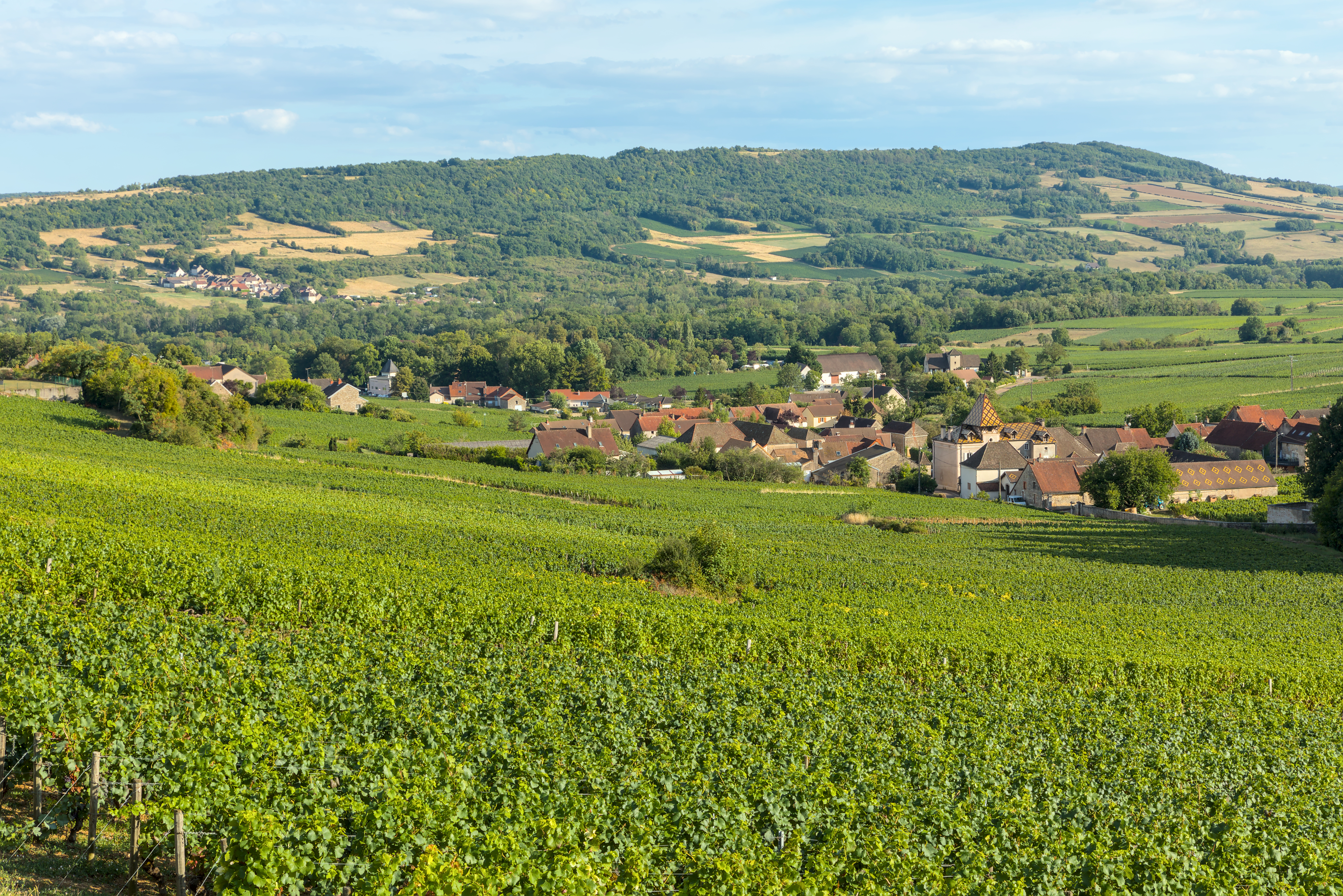
Vineyard, with the hamlet of Haut-Santenay in the background.

== See also ==
- Communes of the Côte-d'Or department
- French wine
- Burgundy wine
- Côte de Beaune
- Ensemble Santenay - an ensemble specializing in the performance of Early Music.
