= Côte d'Or (escarpment) =

Limestone escarpment in Burgundy, France

Coordinates: 47.07°N 4.87°E

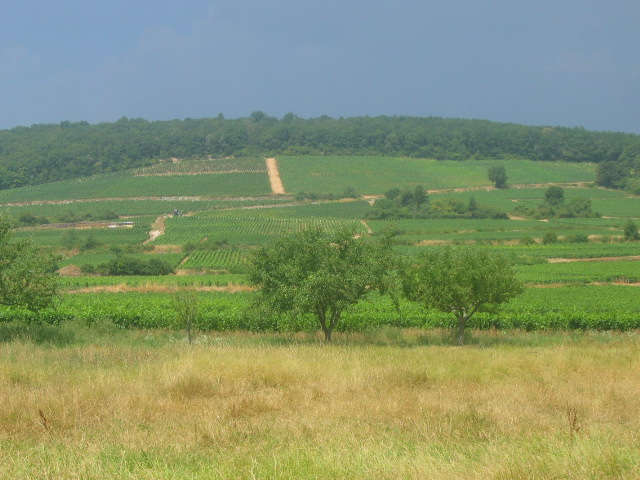
The scarp at Fixin, near Dijon

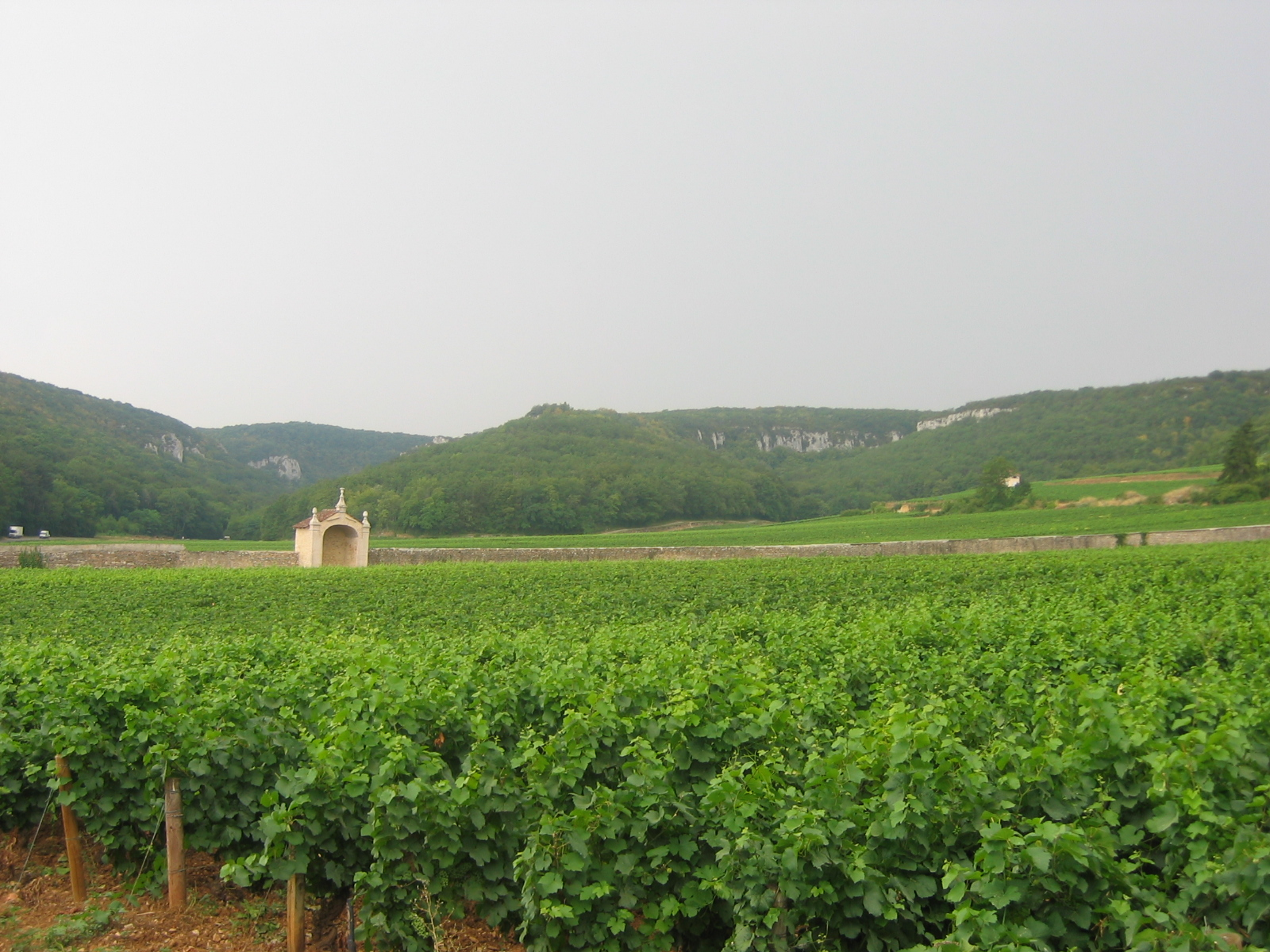
Côte d'Or countryside: vineyards and the coomb of Lavaux

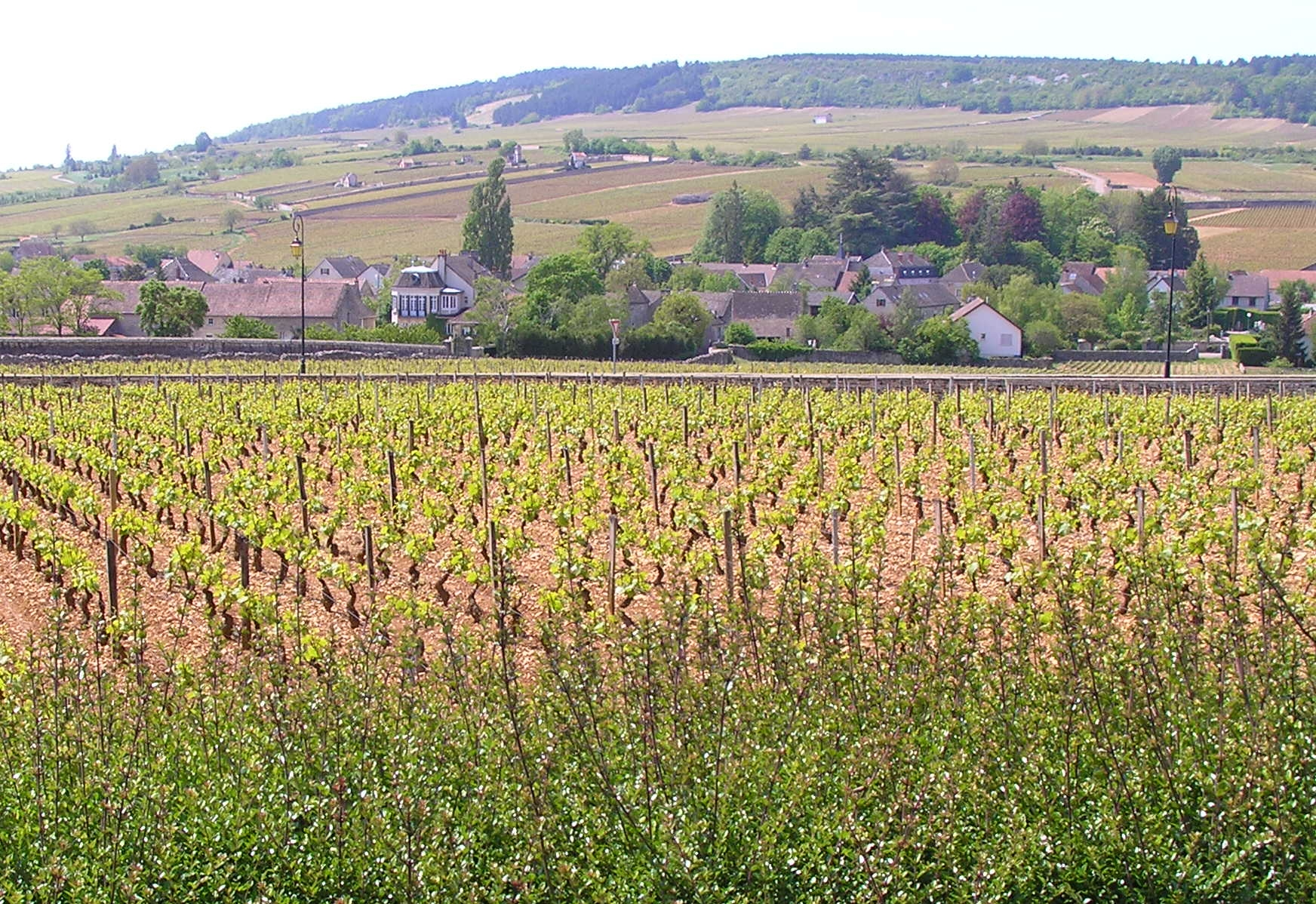
The Côte d'Or near Meursault

The Côte d'Or (French pronunciation: [kot dɔʁ]) is a limestone escarpment in Burgundy, France, and the namesake of the department in which it is located. It stretches from Dijon in the north to the river Dheune to the south, overlooking the valley of the Saône to the east.

The east-facing slope of the Côte d'Or is home to Burgundy wines such as Gevrey-Chambertin, Clos de Vougeot, Meursault and Montrachet. The northern half, the Côte de Nuits, produces red wine almost exclusively. To the south, the Côte de Beaune produces a mix of white wine and red wine. The Route des Grands Crus (Route Nationale 74) runs along the foot of the ridge and is popular with tourists.

== History ==
The area was settled by the Celts, and there is considerable evidence of Roman occupation in the area. Later it came under the influence of the Dukes of Burgundy, with the Cistercians from Cîteaux Abbey playing a prominent role in the development of the vineyards.

== Geology ==
If the Paris hydrological and geological basin is viewed as a saucer with Paris at its centre, the Côte d'Or may be seen as a segment of its south-eastern rim; the counterpart of the chalk cliffs of the Pays de Caux, on the English Channel coast to the north-west. The River Seine rises near the Côte d'Or and enters the sea near the Pays de Caux, having passed through Paris.

The Côte d'Or scarp arises where a broad, relatively shallow graben has formed as a result of an interaction between the forces raising the alpine ridges and the Massif Central. The Jurassic limestone contributes the chemically basic component of the mixture of requirements for a good vineyard, while the scarp provides the drainage and aspect.

At the Côte d'Or, the middle and upper Jurassic rocks overlook the Oligocene, Pliocene and Quaternary rocks of the plain through which the Saône flows southward towards the Mediterranean Sea. The côte therefore forms part of the watershed between northern and southern Europe. On the far side of the plain rise the Jura Mountains, for which the Jurassic period was named.

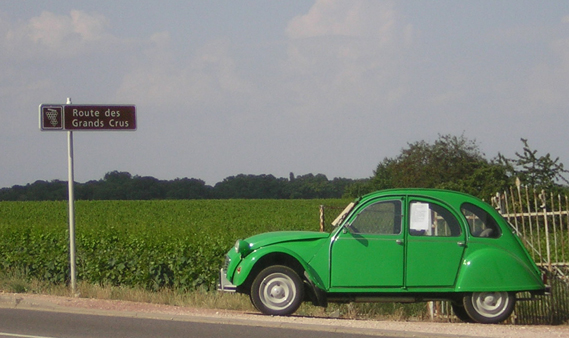
The Route des Grands Crus

== Comblanchien stone ==
Near Nuits-Saint-Georges, part of the middle Jurassic limestone has been metamorphosed into marble. The metamorphism seems to have arisen from the volcanic disturbances in the already existing (Variscan) Massif Central, set off by the Alpine orogeny. The Massif Central is represented locally by its northern extension, the Morvan, which lies between Nevers and the Côte d'Or.

There is a famous vein of fine-grained marble called Pierre de Comblanchien extending from the village of Comblanchien, just south of Nuits-Saint-Georges. The quarries lie in the Côte north and south of the village, overlooking Route Nationale 74. The stone comes in a variety of shades, from beige to the pink of bindweed (Convolvulus). It is not susceptible to frost damage and is capable of accepting a polish.

== See also ==
- Burgundy wine
- French wine
