= Chassagne-Montrachet =

- Commune
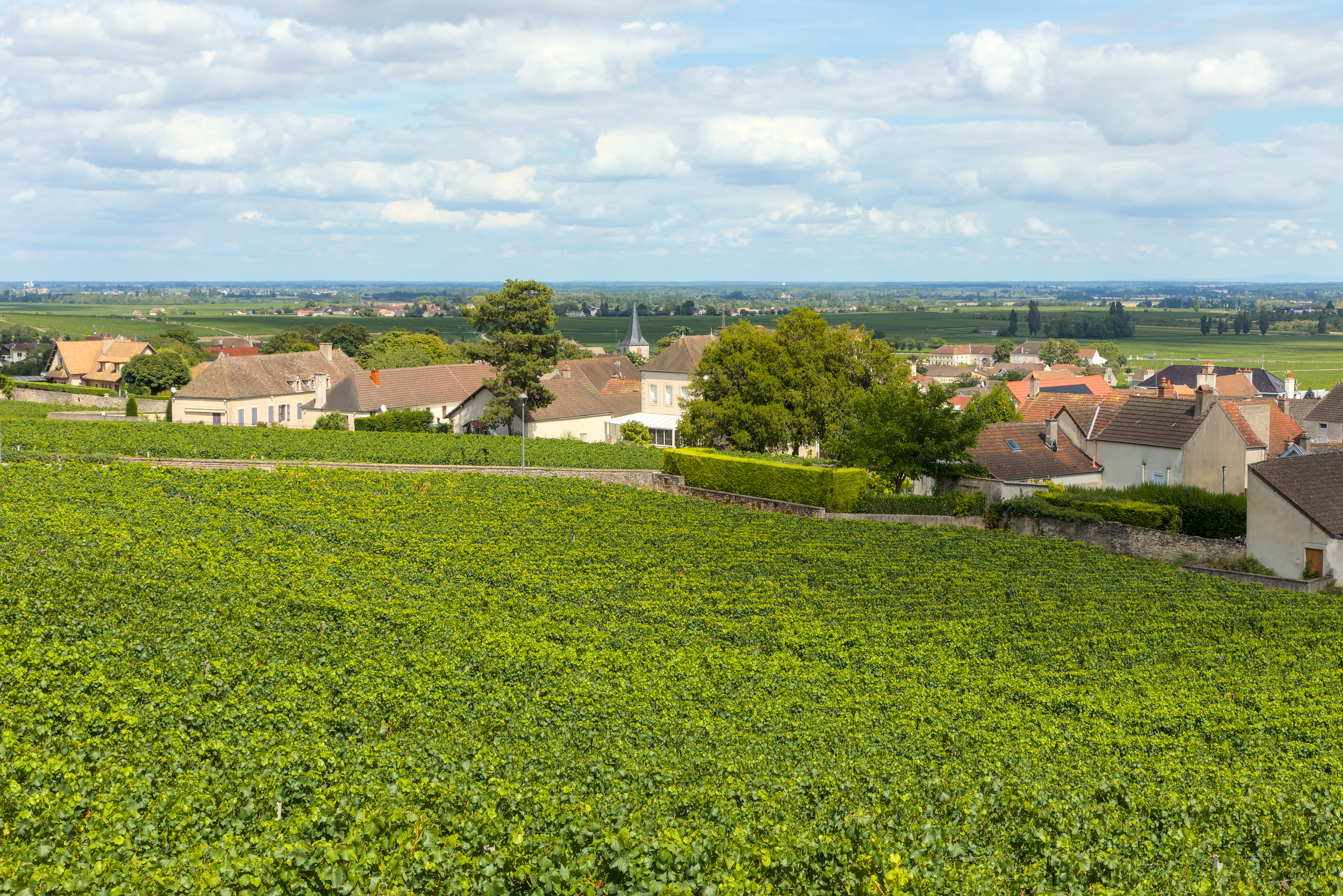
- The village in the vineyards

- Coat of arms
- Location of Chassagne-Montrachet
- Location within France Location within Bourgogne-Franche-Comté
- Coordinates: 46°56′16″N 4°43′45″E
- Country: France
- Region: Bourgogne-Franche-Comté
- Department: Côte-d'Or
- Arrondissement: Beaune
- Canton: Ladoix-Serrigny
- Intercommunality: CA Beaune Côte et Sud

Government
  - Mayor (2020–2026): Céline Dancer
- Area^{1}: 6.5 km^{2} (2.5 sq mi)
- Elevation: 268 m (879 ft)
- Highest elevation: 410 m (1,350 ft)
- Lowest elevation: 209 m (686 ft)
- Population (2023): 261
  - Density: 40/km^{2} (100/sq mi)
- Time zone: UTC+01:00 (CET)
  - Summer (DST): UTC+02:00 (CEST)
- INSEE/Postal code: 21150 /21190
- ^{1} French Land Register data, which excludes lakes, ponds, glaciers > 1 km^{2} (0.386 sq mi or 247 acres) and river estuaries.

Chassagne-Montrachet (French pronunciation: [ʃasaɲ mɔ̃ʁaʃɛ]) is a commune in the Côte-d'Or department of Bourgogne-Franche-Comté in eastern France.

It used to be known under the name Chassagne-le-Haut, but the name was changed to Chassagne-Montrachet by a decree on November 27, 1879. Around this time, many Burgundy villages appended the name of their most famous vineyard to that of the village name.

== Population and politics ==
Historical population
Year	Pop.	±% p.a.
1968	504	—
1975	446	−1.73%
1982	454	+0.25%
1990	431	−0.65%
1999	472	+1.01%
2007	394	−2.23%
2012	330	−3.48%
2017	305	−1.56%
2023	261	−2.56%
Source: INSEE

Chassagne-Montrachet leans to the right in presidential elections. In 2017 it gave 43% of its vote to François Fillon amidst a poor national showing of 20%.

Election	Winning candidate	Party	%
2017	Emmanuel Macron	EM	67.66
2012	Nicolas Sarkozy	UMP	66.00
2007	Nicolas Sarkozy	UMP	68.36
2002	Jacques Chirac	RPR	82.37
1995	Jacques Chirac	RPR	65.37

== Wine ==
Chassagne-Montrachet is an appellation consisting of 350 ha (865 acres) of clayish limestone located south of Côte de Beaune. Most wine produced in the village is white wine from the Chardonnay grape, although red wine is also made from the Pinot noir grape.

The village shares two Grand Cru vineyards - Montrachet and Bâtard-Montrachet - with the neighbouring village of Puligny-Montrachet, and also includes the entirety of a third, Criots-Bâtard-Montrachet, within its boundaries. These three vineyards produce some of the most expensive and long-lived white wines in the world.

== See also ==
- Montrachet
- French Wine
