= Puligny-Montrachet =

- Commune
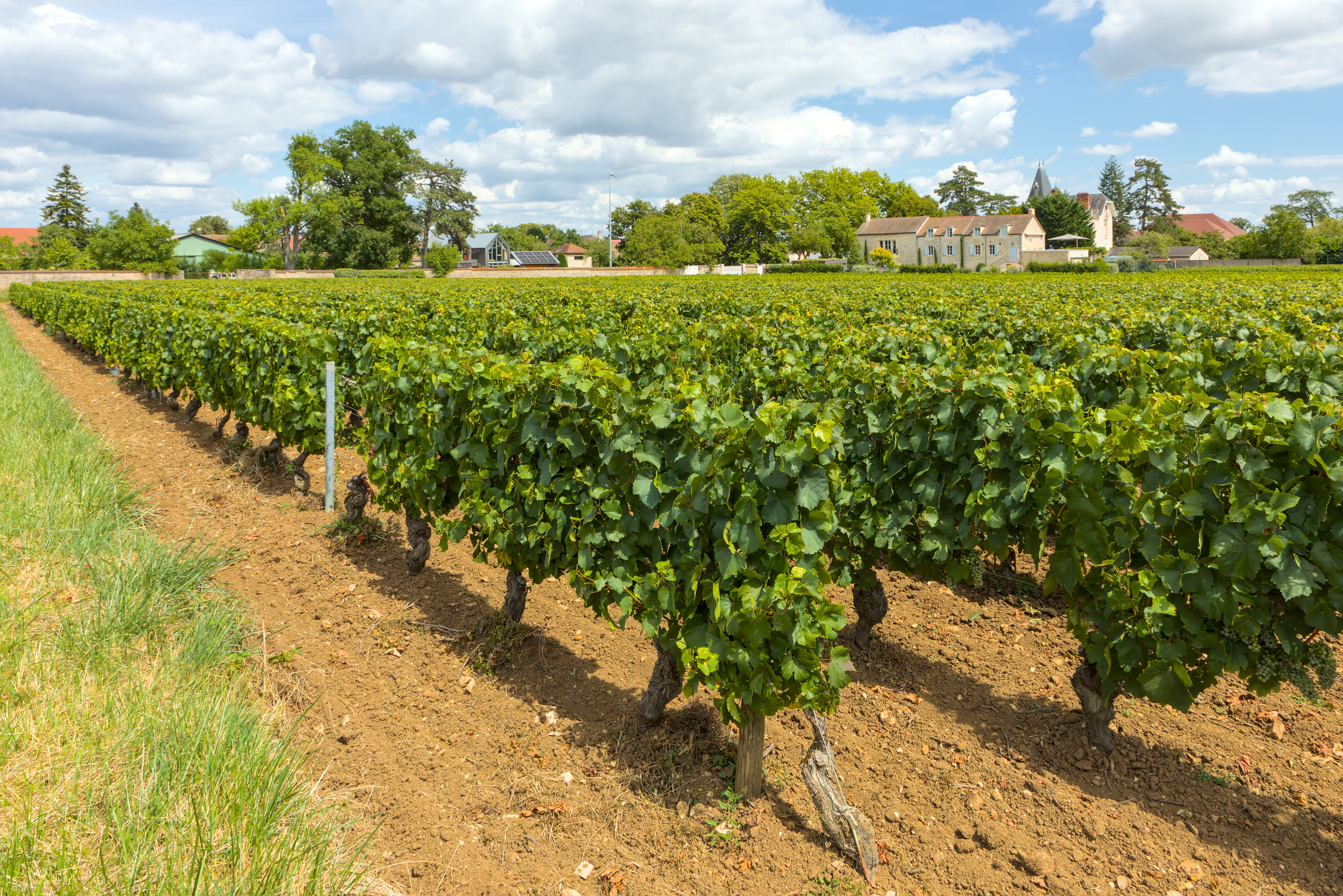
- Vineyard with the village in the background

- Coat of arms
- Location of Puligny-Montrachet
- Location within France Location within Bourgogne-Franche-Comté
- Coordinates: 46°56′46″N 4°45′11″E
- Country: France
- Region: Bourgogne-Franche-Comté
- Department: Côte-d'Or
- Arrondissement: Beaune
- Canton: Ladoix-Serrigny
- Intercommunality: CA Beaune Côte et Sud

Government
  - Mayor (2020–2026): Alexandra Pascal
- Area^{1}: 7.28 km^{2} (2.81 sq mi)
- Elevation: 217 m (712 ft)
- Highest elevation: 435 m (1,427 ft)
- Lowest elevation: 200 m (660 ft)
- Population (2023): 340
  - Density: 47/km^{2} (120/sq mi)
- Time zone: UTC+01:00 (CET)
  - Summer (DST): UTC+02:00 (CEST)
- INSEE/Postal code: 21512 /21190
- ^{1} French Land Register data, which excludes lakes, ponds, glaciers > 1 km^{2} (0.386 sq mi or 247 acres) and river estuaries.

Puligny-Montrachet (French pronunciation: [pyliɲi mɔ̃ʁaʃɛ]) is a commune in the Côte-d'Or department in eastern France.

In the middle of the Côte de Beaune, it is a well-known appellation of Burgundy wine, containing one of the most famous vineyards in the world, Montrachet.

== Population ==
Historical population
Year	Pop.	±% p.a.
1968	597	—
1975	528	−1.74%
1982	528	+0.00%
1990	466	−1.55%
1999	464	−0.05%
2007	426	−1.06%
2012	384	−2.05%
2017	389	+0.26%
2023	340	−2.22%
Source: INSEE

== Wine ==
The "Scabby Hill" ("Mont Rachaz"), not much more than an undulation between the villages of Puligny and Chassagne, is one of the most famous vineyard sites in the world. As with other Burgundy villages, both Puligny and Chassagne now officially append the name of their most famous vineyard to their own names. Wines from the Chassagne side are called "Le Montrachet" and from the Puligny side simply "Montrachet" - there are 4 hectares of each. Above Montrachet proper is the 7.59ha of Chevalier Montrachet (all in Puligny), at the bottom of the slope lies Bâtard Montrachet (6.02ha in Puligny). The names of these two Grand Crus supposedly reflect the division of the estate of the Seigneur de Montrachet between his two sons, one of whom had been a knight in the Crusades, the other was illegitimate. Puligny also contains the Grand Cru of Bienvenues-Bâtard-Montrachet (3.69ha).[2]

There are also 100ha of Premier Cru vineyards out of the total of 235ha in Puligny. Technically there are 24 Premier Crus, although 10 of them represent particular plots within other Premier Crus. While the complex, minerally white wines get all the attention, there are 6.4ha of Pinot Noir.

== See also ==
- Communes of the Côte-d'Or department
- French wine
- Burgundy wine
- Côte de Beaune
