= Côte de Beaune =

Southern part of the Côte d'Or, Burgundy, France

Coordinates: 46°59′24″N 4°46′48″E

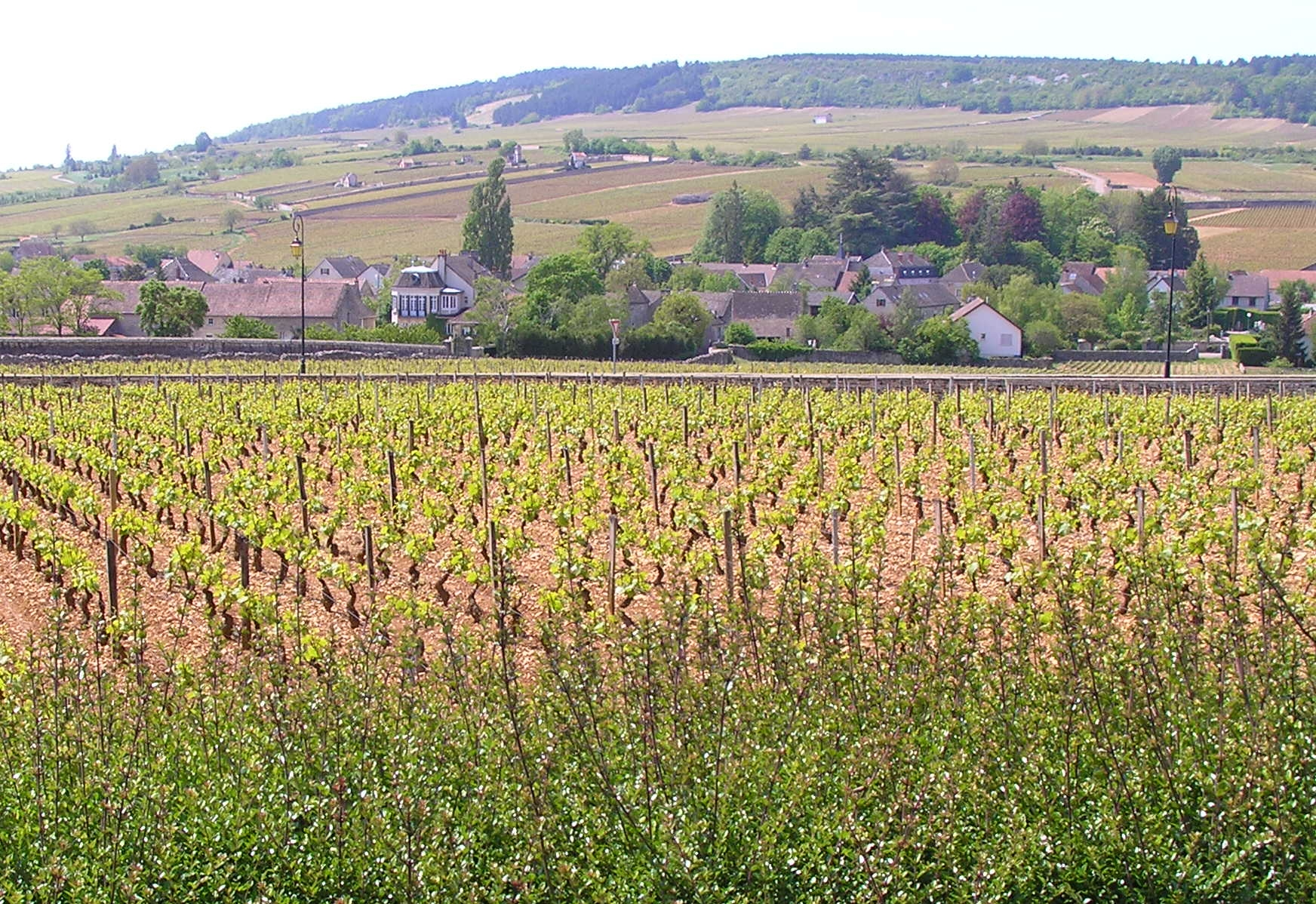
Chardonnay vines around Meursault

The Côte de Beaune area is the southern part of the Côte d'Or, the limestone ridge that is home to the great names of Burgundy wine. The Côte de Beaune (France) starts between Nuits-Saint-Georges and Beaune, and extends southwards for about 25 km to the river Dheune. The trend of producing red wines continues from the Côte de Nuits to the north, down through Beaune, although the wines become lighter and more perfumed. Farther south lies the great names of white Burgundy such as Meursault and Chassagne-Montrachet. The far south of the district sees a return to red wines in Santenay that continues across the Dheune into the Côte Chalonnaise. This mix of Pinot noir and Chardonnay grapes reflects geology in the southern Côte d'Or that is more variable than in the north.

== Appellations ==
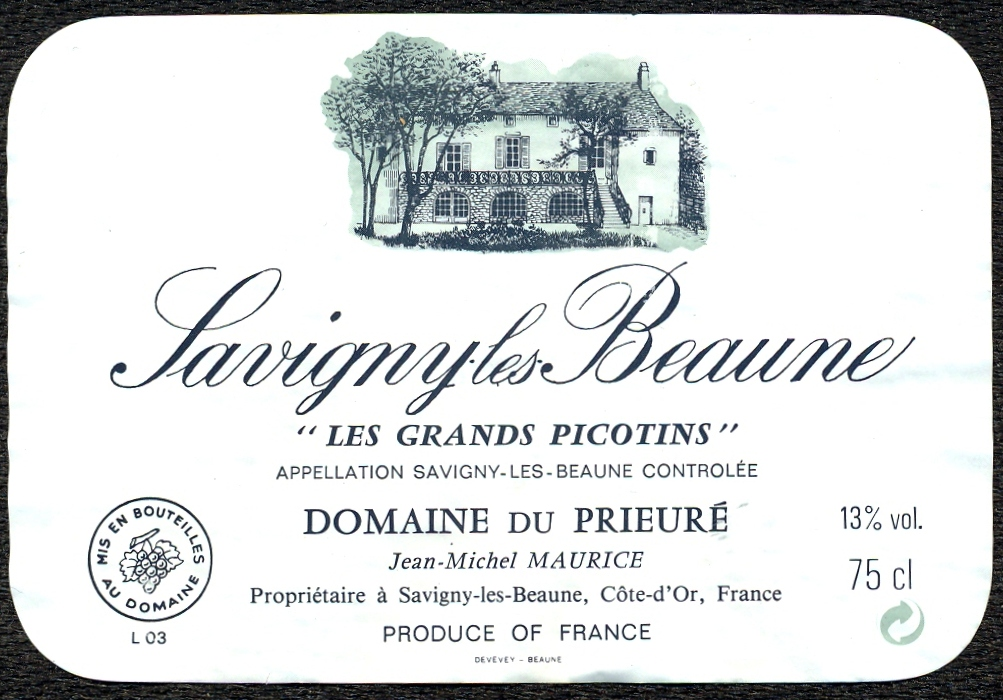
Wine label from Savigny

The Burgundy Wine article explains the local classifications in more detail. Above the basic AOC Bourgogne lies Côte de Beaune Villages, a general appellation for wines from one or more of 16 villages in the district excluding Aloxe-Corton, Pommard, Volnay and Beaune. Four vineyards on a hill above Beaune get the confusing designation of Côte de Beaune. The Hautes-Côtes de Beaune are a separate appellation for the hills to the west of Beaune.

Individual 'village' appellations are the next step up, followed by the Premiers Crus, which roughly correspond to individual vineyards that aren't good enough for Grand Cru status. "Premier Cru" on its own refers to a blend from several premier cru vineyards, wine made from just one location will say "Premier Cru" followed by the name of the vineyard.

The "Cortons" in Aloxe-Corton are the only Grand Cru red wines in the district. The same commune has one of the great white wines in the Grand Cru of Corton-Charlemagne (which extends into Pernand and Ladoix), whilst the Montrachet family of Grand Crus are farther south, split between Puligny-Montrachet and Chassagne-Montrachet.

From north to south, the communes of the Côte de Beaune are as follows :

== Northern communes ==
=== Pernand-Vergelesses ===
In the northwest corner of the Côte de Beaune, Pernand-Vergelesses produces about 30,000 cases, 75% red. The commune contains 34.3ha of the Grand Cru Corton-Charlemagne (see Aloxe-Corton below), and five Premier Crus (57ha), of which Ile de Vergelesses is the most notable. There are 228.3 ha of vineyards in total.

=== Ladoix-Serrigny ===
Down on the plain, Ladoix is the most northernly of the villages of the Côte de Beaune on the N74 Route des Grand Crus. It has 160.1ha of vineyards, including another piece of Corton-Charlemagne.

=== Aloxe-Corton ===
Like Vougeot with the Clos de Vougeot, the appellation of Aloxe (pronounced 'Alosse') is dominated by a single vineyard. The east side of the hill of Corton, about 100 hectares, is devoted to red wines. Each of the 22 plots here is allowed to append its name to that of the vineyard, so you see Corton Le Corton, Corton Clos du Roi, Corton-Bressandes, Corton-Renardes and so on. At their best, the red wines of Corton combine the muscularity of the Côte de Nuits with the elegance of the Côte de Beaune.

On the southwest side of the hill is a piece of land given by Charlemagne to the Abbey of Saulieu in 775. According to legend, his wife had insisted white grapes be planted on the site, to avoid his beard being stained by red wine. If so she had a sharp eye for a vineyard, as the 72ha of Corton-Charlemagne produces some of the great white Burgundies. The appellation of Aloxe-Corton covers 297.1 ha. of which 169.6 ha is Grand Cru and 37.5 ha is Premier Cru.

=== Savigny-lès-Beaune ===
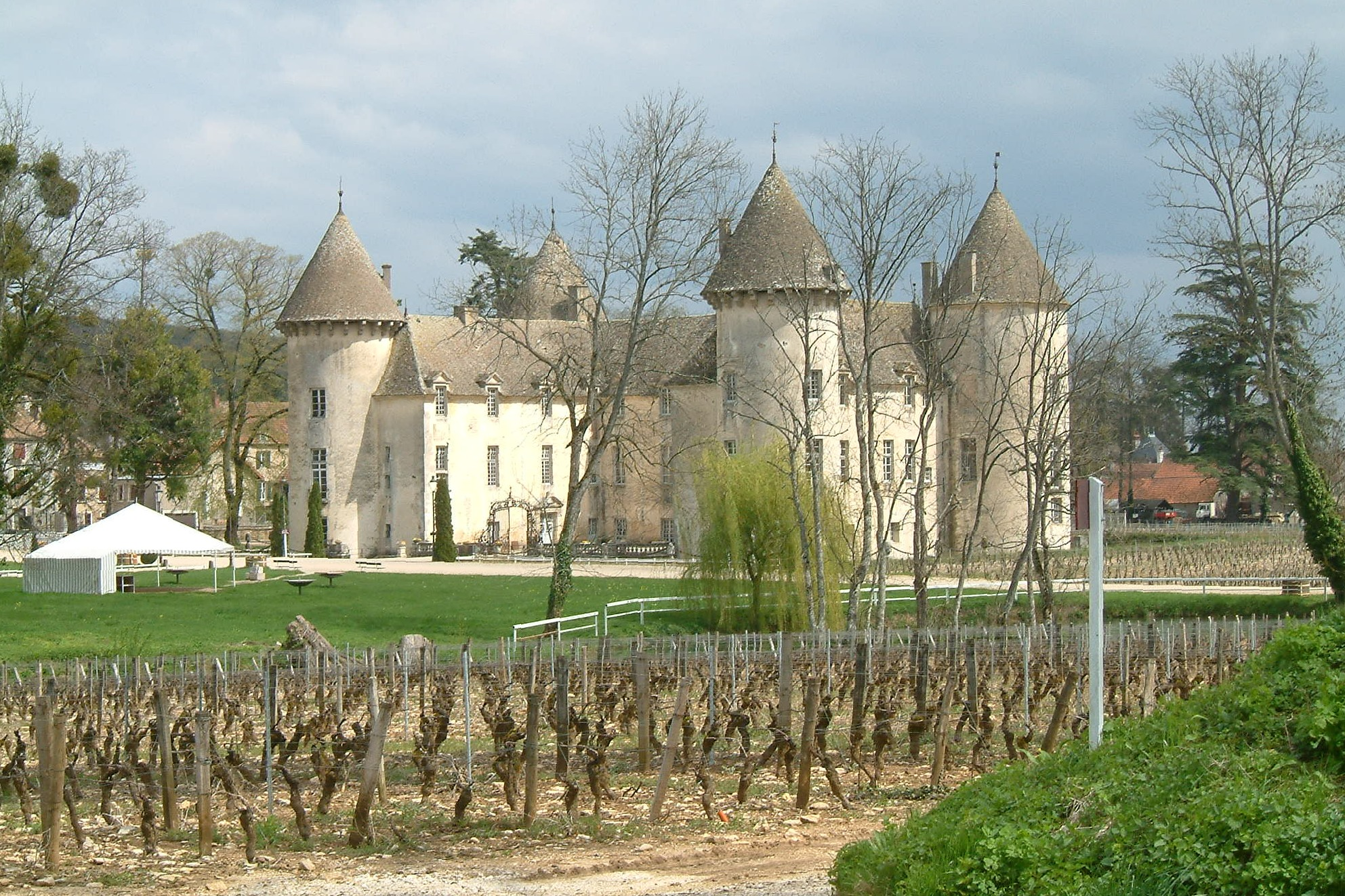
Château of Savigny-lès-Beaune

Savigny is the third biggest appellation by production in the Côte de Beaune, with around 100,000 cases of mostly red wine. The 22 Premier Crus come in two styles, more delicate on the south-facing clay soils to the north, and rounder and more forward on the east-facing gravel to the south. The vineyards cover 544 ha of which 141.5 ha is Premier Cru.

=== Chorey-lès-Beaune ===
Another satellite of Beaune produces mostly red wine in a similar style to Beaune and Savigny but even lighter. The appellation was only awarded in 1970. There are no Premier Crus in its 168ha, of which 9.3ha is Chardonnay.

=== Beaune ===
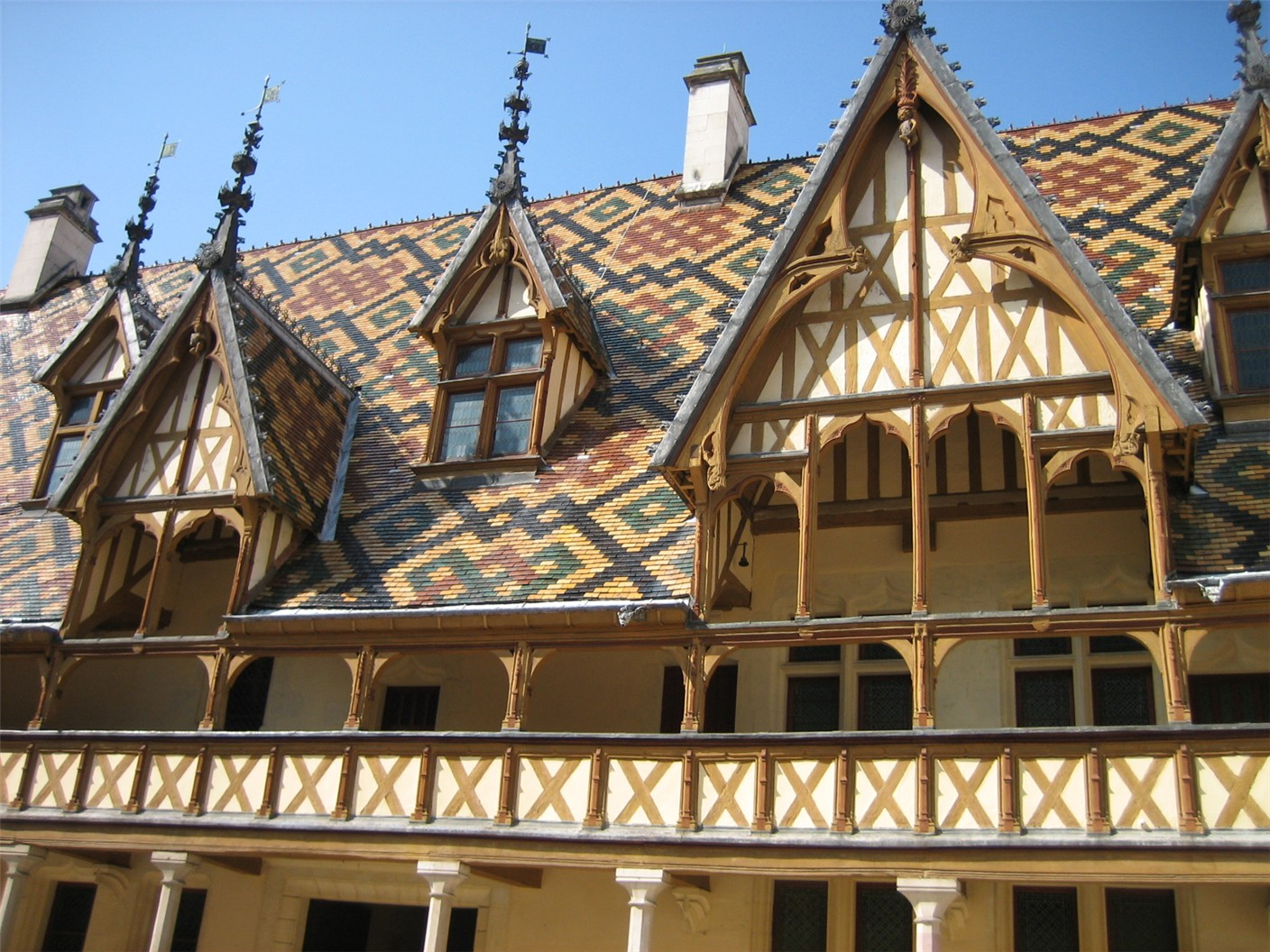
The famous roof of the Hospices de Beaune

The commercial centre of the Côte d'Or is also the biggest appellation by production, with 170,000 cases. Most of the big negociants have substantial holdings in the region. The 28 Premier Crus occupy 322ha of the 450ha. The northern wines are firmer and longer lasting, and the southern wines are softer and more forward. As mentioned above, a local hill gets its own appellation of "Côte de Beaune".

The Hospices de Beaune is a charity based in the town, consisting of the Hôtel-Dieu Hospital and the Hospices de la Charité. The Hospices are funded by their endowment of 55ha of vineyards on the Côte d'Or, and the auction of their wines on the third Sunday in November sets a benchmark for prices for that vintage.

=== Pommard ===
Pommard (pronounced Poe-Marr) makes some of the most tannic and full-bodied wines from the Côte d'Or department. Like Nuits-St-George, the name of Pommard was made famous as a marketplace for wines from better areas, in the days before Appellation Controlee. The fact that its name is easy for foreigners to pronounce also helped. 130,000 cases from 337ha make Pommard the second biggest area by production after Beaune. 135ha of that is Premier Cru, of which Les Epenots and Les Rugiens are the most notable.

=== Volnay ===
In general, the wines from Volnay are lighter, more elegant, and more graceful than most other red Burgundies from the Côte d'Or. 80,000 cases of red wine come from its 242ha of vineyards, of which 115ha is split among 26 Premier Crus. The most notable of these are Bousse d'Or, Champans, Clos des Chenese, Clos des Ducs, Les Caillerets, Santenots and Taille Pied.

Red wine from the Santenots vineyard is classified as Volnay Santenots, whereas white wine from the same vineyard can call itself Meursault Premier Cru or Meursault Santenots.

=== Monthélie ===
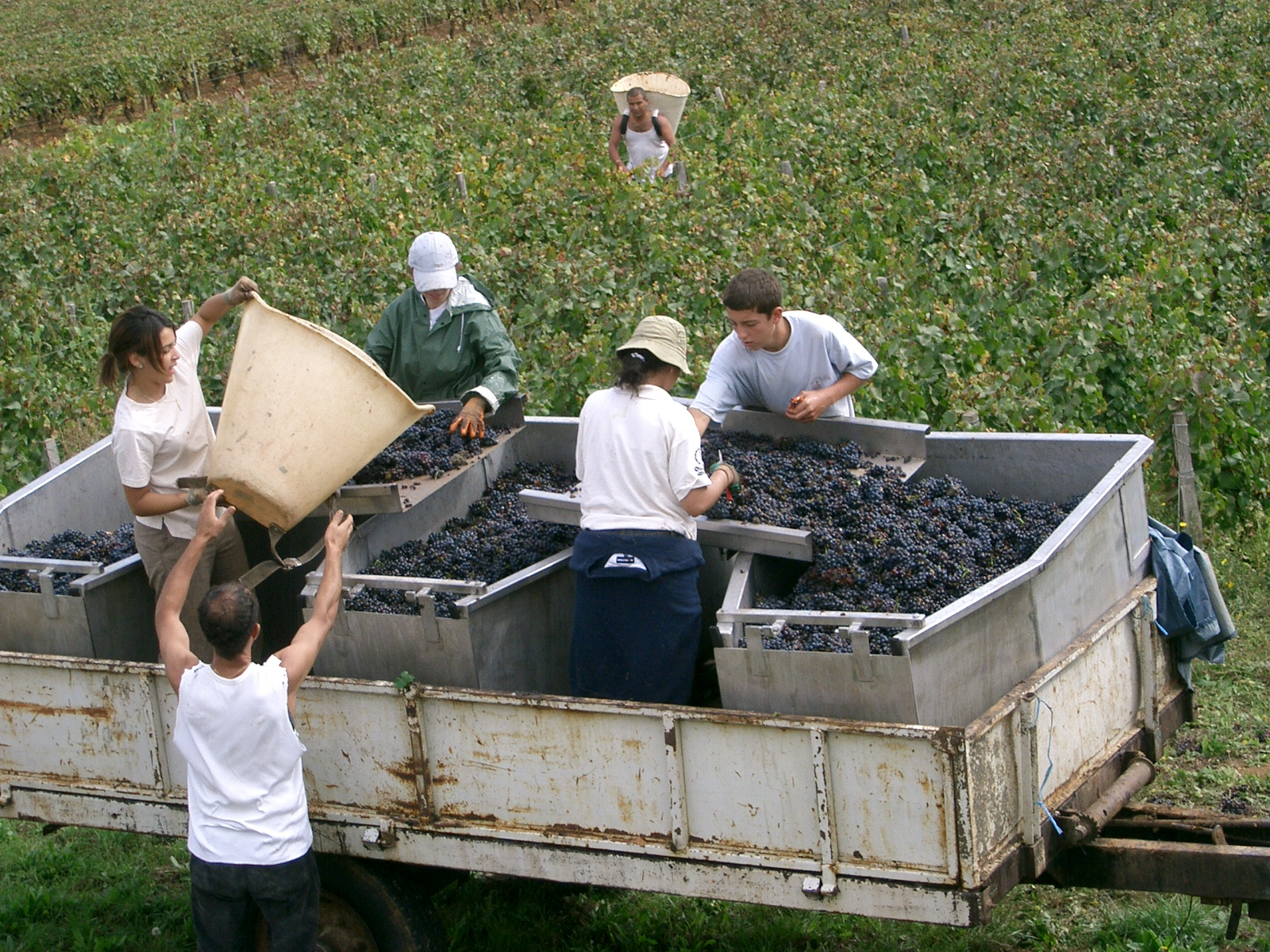
Harvest time on the Côte de Beaune

Southwest of Volnay lies the historic hamlet of Monthélie. It's a little off the beaten track both literally and in the world of wine, but Volnay's little brother can supply Volnay-style red wines at less-than-Volnay prices. 31ha of the 140ha is Premier Cru.

=== Saint Romain ===
The former name of "Belles Roches" hints at the spectacular location of Saint Romain, nestling under a cliff at the top of the Clous valley above Meursault. The appellation was only designated in 1947, and there are no Premier Crus in its 135 ha. The mostly red wines represent the more rustic side of Burgundy and take a little while to come around.

=== Auxey-Duresses ===
Formerly owned by the abbey at Cluny, Auxey was once the site of many watermills powered by the river Clous. It is another of those appellations that are less well known, as its wines used to be sold as Volnay or Pommard. It has 32ha of Premier Crus within its 170ha, and the significant plantings of Chardonnay tell us that we are about to enter white wine territory.

== Southern communes ==
=== Meursault ===
Perhaps surprisingly, one of the most famous names in Burgundy has no Grand Crus, although there have been calls for Les Perrieres to be so designated ever since it was described as "tête de cuvée" in the 1855 list. Meursault grows Chardonnay almost exclusively (note the exception of Santenots mentioned in the Volnay section), which makes wonderfully rich and buttery white Burgundy, developing a certain nuttiness with time. The Premier Crus occupy 132ha of the 437ha.

=== Blagny ===
Blagny is a former Gallo-Roman village down on the plain, whose white wines are sold as Meursault or Puligny-Montrachet. The Blagny appellation was created in 1970 for the red wines of the neighbourhood. They don't have the fineness of the wines from up on the ridge, but Blagny is a source of cheaper red Burgundy in a light, rustic style.

=== Puligny-Montrachet ===
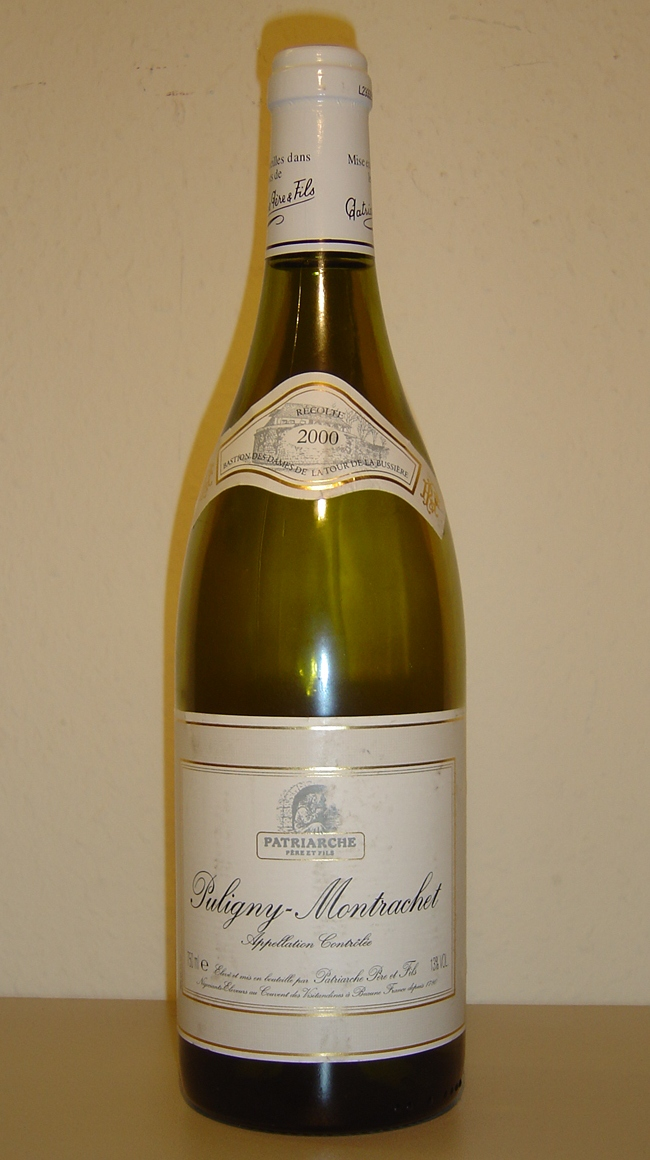
Puligny-Montrachet village wine

The "Scabby Hill" ("Mont Rachaz"), not much more than an undulation between Puligny and Chassagne, is one of the most famous vineyard sites in the world. Wines from the Chassagne side are called "Le Montrachet" and from the Puligny side simply "Montrachet" - there are 4 hectares of each. Above Montrachet proper is the 7.59ha of Chevalier Montrachet (all in Puligny), at the bottom of the slope lies Bâtard Montrachet (6.02ha in Puligny). The names of these two Grand Crus supposedly reflect the division of the estate of the Seigneur de Montrachet between his two sons, one of whom had been a knight in the Crusades, the other was illegitimate. Puligny also contains the Grand Cru of Bienvenues-Bâtard-Montrachet (3.69ha).

There are also 100ha of Premier Cru vineyards out of the total of 235ha in Puligny. Technically there are 24 Premier Crus, although 10 of them represent particular plots within other Premier Crus. While the complex, minerally white wines get all the attention, there is 6.4ha of Pinot Noir.

=== Chassagne-Montrachet ===
As well as 4ha of Le Montrachet (sic) and 5.85ha of Bâtard Montrachet, Chassagne contains all 1.57ha of the Grand Cru Criots-Bâtard-Montrachet. There are 159 hectares of Premier Cru in the 350.4ha of Chassagne, which contains a surprising amount of Pinot noir. Less red wine is now being produced, as it sells for lower prices than the whites although much of the Pinot land is less suited to Chardonnay production. The white wine tends to be richer than that of Puligny but not as elegant; the reds are quite robust and need time to come around.

=== Saint Aubin ===
Out towards the Hautes-Côtes de Beaune west of Montrachet, the vineyards of St Aubin were once planted with Gamay but now produce a mixture of Chardonnay and Pinot noir. Traditionally the village has been overshadowed by the famous names to the east, although the reputation of its white wines is developing as the prices of their neighbours head into the stratosphere. The red wines have leathery notes in their youth, that soften attractively with age. 156ha of the 237ha are Premier Crus.

=== Santenay ===
The southern tail of the Côte de Beaune sees Pinot noir predominate, with 90% of wine from Santenay being red. The wines are solid, tending more towards the rustic than the elegant, but are cheaper than the big names to the north. Santenay has 124ha of Premier Crus in its 379ha. Greyish limestone makes up the high ground up to a height of 500 meters. Lower down the slope, starting at the 300-meter line, is oolitic limestone, white oolite, marls, kidney-shaped limestone, and lower oolite on a layer of marl.

=== Les Maranges ===
Les Maranges was created in 1989 as a merger of three appellations west of Santenay: Cheilly-lès-Maranges, Dezizes-lès-Maranges, and Sampigny-lès-Maranges. Being in Saône et Loire some people consider these villages to be not part of the Côte d'Or proper, although the geology is similar and the wines are decent. 100ha of the 240ha is Premier Cru.

== See also ==
- French wine
- Burgundy wine
- Côte de Nuits
