= List of Appellation d'Origine Contrôlée wines =

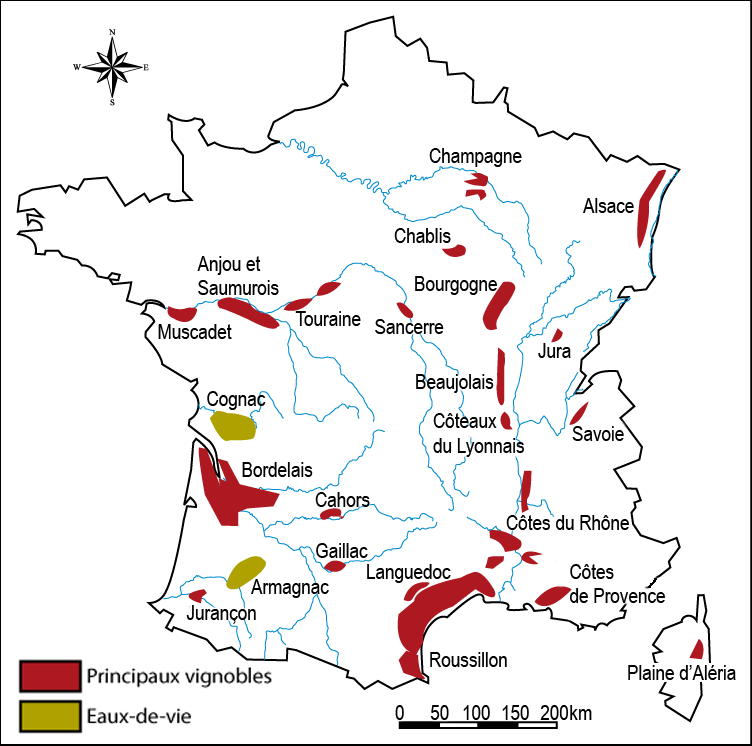
Wine regions of France

The following is a list of French wines that are entitled to use the designation Appellation d'Origine Contrôlée (AOC) on their label. There are currently over 300 appellations acknowledged by the INAO.

AOC	Wine region	Est. date	Comments
Ajaccio	Corsica	1984	Before 1984 a designation within Corse or Vin du Corse under the alternative names Ajaccio or Coteaux d'Ajaccio
Aloxe-Corton	Burgundy	1938	
Alsace	Alsace	1945	
Alsace Grand Cru	Alsace	1975	
Anjou	Loire	1936	
Anjou-Coteaux de la Loire	Loire	1946	
Anjou-Gamay	Loire	1936	
Anjou mousseux	Loire	1938	
Anjou Villages	Loire	1991	
Anjou Villages Brissac	Loire	1998	
Arbois	Jura	1936	
Auxey-Duresses	Burgundy	1970	
Bandol	Provence	1941	
Banyuls	Languedoc-Roussillon	1972	
Banyuls Grand Cru	Languedoc-Roussillon	1972	
Barsac	Bordeaux	1936	
Bâtard-Montrachet	Burgundy	1937	
Béarn	South West France	1975	
Beaujolais	Beaujolais	1937	
Beaujolais-Villages	Beaujolais	1937	
Beaumes de Venise	Rhône	2005	Before 2005 a part of Côtes du Rhône Villages
Beaune	Burgundy	1936	
Bellet	Provence	1941	
Bergerac	South West France	1936	
Bergerac sec	South West France	1936	
Bergerac rosé	South West France	1936	
Bienvenues-Bâtard-Montrachet	Burgundy	1937	
Blagny	Burgundy	1970	
Blanquette de Limoux	Languedoc-Roussillon	1981	
Blanquette méthode ancestrale	Languedoc	1981	
Blaye	Bordeaux	1936	
Bonnes-Mares	Burgundy	1936	
Bonnezeaux	Loire	1951	
Bordeaux	Bordeaux	1936	
Bordeaux clairet	Bordeaux	1936	
Bordeaux Côtes de Francs	Bordeaux	1936	
Bordeaux Haut-Benauge	Bordeaux	1936	
Bordeaux moelleux	Bordeaux	1936	
Bordeaux rosé	Bordeaux	1936	
Bordeaux sec	Bordeaux	1936	
Bordeaux supérieur	Bordeaux	1943	
Bourgogne	Burgundy	1937	
Bourgogne aligoté	Burgundy	1937	
Bourgogne clairet	Burgundy	1937	
Bourgogne clairet Côte chalonnaise	Burgundy		
Bourgogne Coulanges-la-Vineuse	Burgundy		
Bourgogne Côte Saint-Jacques	Burgundy		
Bourgogne Coulanges-la-Vineuse	Burgundy		
Bourgogne Côtes d'Auxerre	Burgundy		
Bourgogne Côtes du Couchois	Burgundy		
Bourgogne Epineuil	Burgundy		
Bourgogne grand ordinaire	Burgundy		
Bourgogne Hautes-côtes de Beaune	Burgundy	1937	
Bourgogne Hautes-côtes de Nuits	Burgundy	1937	
Bourgogne La Chapelle Notre-Dame	Burgundy		
Bourgogne le Chapitre	Burgundy		
Bourgogne Montrecul	Burgundy		
Bourgogne mousseux	Burgundy		
Bourgogne ordinaire	Burgundy		
Bourgogne Passe-tout-grains	Burgundy	1937	
Bourgogne Vézelay	Burgundy		
Bourgogne rosé	Burgundy	1937	
Bourgueil	Loire	1937	
Bouzeron	Burgundy	1998	AOC under this name in 1998, the designation Bourgogne aligoté Bouzeron existed since 1937
Brouilly	Beaujolais	1938	
Bugey	Bugey	2009	
Buzet	South West France	1973	Originally under the name Côtes de Buzet, changed to Buzet in 1986
Cabardes	Languedoc-Roussillon	1999	As VDQS also known under the alternative name Côtes du Cabardès et de l'Orbiel
Cabernet d'Anjou	Loire	1964	
Cabernet de Saumur	Loire	1964	
Cadillac	Bordeaux	1973	
Cahors	South West France	1971	
Cairanne	Rhone Valley	2018	
Cassis	Provence	1936	
Cérons	Bordeaux	1936	
Chablis	Burgundy	1938	
Chablis Grand Cru	Burgundy	1938	
Chablis Premier Cru	Burgundy	1938	
Chambertin	Burgundy	1937	
Chambertin-Clos-de-Beze	Burgundy	1937	
Chambolle-Musigny	Burgundy	1936	
Champagne	Champagne	1936	
Chapelle-Chambertin	Burgundy	1937	
Charlemagne	Burgundy	1937	
Charmes-Chambertin	Burgundy	1937	
Chassagne-Montrachet	Burgundy	1970	
Château-Chalon	Jura	1936	
Château-Grillet	Rhône	1936	
Châteauneuf-du-Pape	Rhône	1923	
Châtillon-en-Diois	Rhône	1975	
Chaume	Loire	2003	Until 2003 and 2005-2007 a village designation within Coteaux du Layon. Created as a separate AOC in 2003 under the name Chaume Premier Cru des Coteaux du Layon, which was annulled in 2005. Chaume created anew as an AOC in 2007.
Chénas	Beaujolais	1936	
Chevalier-Montrachet	Burgundy	1937	
Cheverny	Loire	1993	
Chinon	Loire	1937	
Chiroubles	Beaujolais	1936	
Chorey-les-Beaune	Burgundy	1970	
Clairette de Bellegarde	Languedoc-Roussillon	1949	
Clairette de Die	Rhône	1993	
Clairette du Languedoc	Languedoc-Roussillon	1948	Original decree of 28 September 1948 updated 12 April 1965, 30 August 1972, and 15 November 1983
Clos des Lambrays	Burgundy	1981	Originally a Premier Cru vineyard in Morey-Saint-Denis
Clos de la Roche	Burgundy	1936	
Clos de Tart	Burgundy	1939	
Clos de Vougeot	Burgundy	1937	
Clos Saint-Denis	Burgundy	1936	
Collioure	Languedoc-Roussillon	1971	
Condrieu	Rhône	1940	
Corbieres	Languedoc-Roussillon	1985	
Cornas	Rhône	1938	
Corse or Vin de Corse	Corsica	1976	
Corton	Burgundy	1937	
Corton-Charlemagne	Burgundy	1937	
Costières de Nîmes	Rhône	1986	Originally Costières du Gard, renamed to Costières de Nîmes in 1989, and in 2004 reassigned to the Rhône region
Côte de Beaune	Burgundy	1970	
Côte de Beaune-Villages	Burgundy	1970	
Côte de Brouilly	Beaujolais	1938	
Côte de Nuits-villages	Burgundy	1964	
Côte Roannaise	Loire	1994	
Côte-Rôtie	Rhône	1940	
Coteaux Champenois	Champagne	1974	
Coteaux d'Aix-en-Provence	Provence	1985	
Coteaux de Die	Rhône	1993	
Coteaux de l'Aubance	Loire	1950	
Coteaux de Pierrevert	Provence	1998	
Coteaux du Giennois	Loire	1998	
Coteaux du Languedoc	Languedoc-Roussillon	1985	
Coteaux du Layon	Loire	1950	
Coteaux du Loir	Loire	1948	
Coteaux du Lyonnais	Lyonnais	1984	
Coteaux du Quercy	South West France	2011	upgraded to AOC (AOP) from AOVDQS as disappear as label in 2011
Coteaux de Saumur	Loire	1948	
Coteaux du Tricastin	Rhône	1973	
Coteaux du Vendômois	Loire	2001	
Coteaux Varois	Provence	1993	
Côtes de Bergerac	South West France	1936	
Côtes de Bergerac Blanc	South West France	1936	
Côtes de Blaye	Bordeaux	1995	Formerly part of Blaye
Côtes de Bordeaux Saint-Macaire	Bordeaux	1937	
Côtes de Bourg	Bordeaux	1936	AOC in 1936 for red wines, in 1941 for white wines
Côtes de Castillon	Bordeaux	1989	Separate AOC in 1989, formerly Côtes de Castillon could be added to Bordeaux AOC
Côtes de Duras	South West France	1937	
Côtes du Forez	Loire	2000	
Côtes de la Malepere	Languedoc	2007	
Côtes de Millau	South West France	2011	upgraded to AOC (AOP) from AOVDQS as disappear as label in 2011
Côtes de Montravel	South West France	1937	
Côtes de Provence	Provence	1977	
Côtes de Toul	Eastern France	1998	
Côtes du Jura	Jura	1937	
Côtes du Luberon	Rhône	1988	
Côtes du Marmandais	South West France	1990	
Côtes du Rhône	Rhône	1937	
Côtes du Rhône Villages	Rhône	1966	
Côtes du Roussillon	Languedoc-Roussillon	1977	
Côtes du Roussillon Villages	Languedoc-Roussillon	1977	
Côtes du Ventoux	Rhône	1973	
Côtes du Vivarais	Rhône	1999	
Cour-Cheverny	Loire	1993	
Crémant d'Alsace	Alsace	1976	
Crémant de Bordeaux	Bordeaux	1990	
Crémant de Bourgogne	Burgundy	1975	
Crémant de Die	Rhône	1993	
Crémant du Jura	Jura	1995	
Crémant de Limoux	Languedoc-Roussillon	1990	
Crémant de Loire	Loire	1975	
Crépy	Savoy	1948	
Criots-Bâtard-Montrachet	Burgundy	1937	
Crozes-Hermitage	Rhône	1937	
Échezeaux	Burgundy	1937	
Entre-Deux-Mers	Bordeaux	1937	
Entre-Deux-Mers-Haut-Benauge	Bordeaux	1937	
Faugeres	Languedoc-Roussillon	1982	
Fitou	Languedoc-Roussillon	1948	
Fixin	Burgundy	1936	
Fleurie	Beaujolais	1936	
Fronsac	Bordeaux	1937	Originally Côtes de Fronsac, name changed to Fronsac in 1976
Frontignan	Languedoc-Roussillon	1936	
Fronton	South West France	1975	Originally under the name Côtes du Frontonnais, name changed to Fronton in 2005
Gaillac	South West France	1970	
Gaillac Premieres Côtess	South West France	1970	
Gevrey-Chambertin	Burgundy	1936	
Gigondas	Rhône	1971	
Givry	Burgundy	1946	
Grand Roussillon	Languedoc-Roussillon	1972	
Grands Échezeaux	Burgundy	1936	
Graves	Bordeaux	1937	
Graves de Vayres	Bordeaux	1937	
Graves Supérieures	Bordeaux	1937	
Griotte-Chambertin	Burgundy	1937	
Gros-plant-du-pays-nantais	Loire	2012	
Haut-Médoc	Bordeaux	1936	
Haut-Montravel	South West France	1937	
Haut-Poitou	Loire	2011	
Hermitage	Rhône	1937	
Irancy	Burgundy	1999	The designation Bourgogne Irancy existed since 1937
Irouléguy	South West France	1970	
Jasnieres	Loire	1937	
Juliénas	Beaujolais	1938	
Jurançon	South West France	1936	
L'Étoile	Jura	1937	
Ladoix	Burgundy	1970	
La Grande Rue	Burgundy	1936	
Lalande-de-Pomerol	Bordeaux	1936	
La Romanée	Burgundy	1936	
La Tâche	Burgundy	1936	
Latricieres-Chambertin	Burgundy	1937	
Les Baux-de-Provence	Provence	1995	Before 1995 a part of Coteaux d'Aix-en-Provence AOC
Limoux	Languedoc-Roussillon	1981	
Lirac	Rhône	1947	
Listrac-Médoc	Bordeaux	1957	Separate AOC in 1957 under the name Listrac, also part of the area for Haut-Médoc. Change of name to Listrac-Médoc in 1986.
Loupiac	Bordeaux	1936	
Lussac-Saint-Émilion	Bordeaux	1936	
Mâcon	Burgundy	1937	
Mâcon supérieur	Burgundy	1937	
Mâcon-villages	Burgundy	1937	
Madiran	South West France	1948	
Maranges	Burgundy	1989	
Marcillac	South West France	1990	
Margaux	Bordeaux	1936	
Marsannay	Burgundy	1987	
Maury	Languedoc-Roussillon	1972	
Mazis-Chambertin	Burgundy	1937	
Mazoyeres-Chambertin	Burgundy	1937	
Médoc	Bordeaux	1936	
Menetou-Salon	Loire	1959	
Mercurey	Burgundy	1936	
Meursault	Burgundy	1970	
Minervois	Languedoc-Roussillon	1985	
Minervois-La Liviniere	Languedoc-Roussillon	1999	
Monbazillac	South West France	1936	
Montagne Saint-Émilion	Bordeaux	1936	
Montagny	Burgundy	1936	
Monthelie	Burgundy	1970	
Montlouis	Loire	1938	
Montrachet	Burgundy	1937	
Montravel	South West France	1937	
Morey-Saint-Denis	Burgundy	1936	
Morgon	Beaujolais	1936	
Moulin a vent	Beaujolais	1936	
Moulis or Moulis-en-Médoc	Bordeaux	1938	
Muscadet	Loire	1937	
Muscadet-Coteaux de la Loire	Loire	1936	
Muscadet-Côtes de Grandlieu	Loire	1994	
Muscadet-Sevre et Maine	Loire	1936	also written Muscadet de Sèvre et Maine
Muscat de Beaumes-de-Venise	Rhône	1945	
Muscat de Frontignan	Languedoc-Roussillon	1936	
Muscat de Lunel	Languedoc-Roussillon	1943	
Muscat de Mireval	Languedoc-Roussillon	1959	
Muscat de Rivesaltes	Languedoc-Roussillon	1972	
Muscat de Saint-Jean de Minervois	Languedoc-Roussillon	1949	
Musigny	Burgundy	1936	
Néac	Bordeaux	1936	
Nuits-Saint-Georges	Burgundy	1972	
Orléans	Loire	2006	
Orléans-Cléry	Loire	2006	
Pacherenc du Vic-Bilh	South West France	1948	
Pacherenc du Vic-Bilh Sec	South West France	1948	
Palette	Provence	1948	
Patrimonio	Corsica	1984	Before 1984 a designation within Corse or Vin du Corse
Pauillac	Bordeaux	1936	
Pécharmant	South West France	1946	
Pernand-Vergelesses	Burgundy	1970	
Pessac-Léognan	Bordeaux	1987	Before 1987 part of Graves AOC
Petit Chablis	Burgundy	1944	
Pomerol	Bordeaux	1936	
Pommard	Burgundy	1936	
Pouilly-Fuissé	Burgundy	1936	
Pouilly-Fumé	Loire	1937	May also be written Blanc Fumé de Pouilly
Pouilly-Loché	Burgundy	1940	
Pouilly-sur-Loire	Loire	1937	
Pouilly-Vinzelles	Burgundy	1940	
Premieres Côtes de Blaye	Bordeaux	1994	Before 1994 part of Blaye
Premieres Côtes de Bordeaux	Bordeaux	1937	
Puisseguin Saint-Émilion	Bordeaux	1936	
Puligny-Montrachet	Burgundy	1970	
Quarts de Chaume	Loire	1954	
Quincy	Loire	1936	
Régnié	Beaujolais	1988	
Reuilly	Loire	1937	
Richebourg	Burgundy	1936	
Rivesaltes	Languedoc-Roussillon	1997	
Romanée-Conti	Burgundy	1936	
Romanée-Saint-Vivant	Burgundy	1936	
Rosé d'Anjou	Loire	1936	
Rosé de Loire	Loire	1974	
Rosé des Riceys	Champagne	1971	
Rosette	South West France	1946	
Roussette de Savoie	Savoy	1973	
Roussette du Bugey	Bugey	2009	
Ruchottes-Chambertin	Burgundy	1937	
Rully	Burgundy	1939	
Saint-Amour	Beaujolais	1946	
Saint-Aubin	Burgundy	1970	
Saint-Bris	Burgundy	2003	As VDQS previously known as Sauvignon de Saint-Bris
Saint-Chinian	Languedoc-Roussillon	1982	
Saint-Émilion	Bordeaux	1936	
Saint-Émilion Grand Cru	Bordeaux	1936	
Saint-Estephe	Bordeaux	1936	
Saint-Georges Saint-Émilion	Bordeaux	1936	
Saint-Joseph	Rhône	1956	
Saint-Julien	Bordeaux	1936	
Saint-Mont	South West France	2011	upgraded to AOC (AOP) from AOVDQS as disappear as label in 2011
Saint-Nicolas-de-Bourgueil	Loire	1937	
Saint-Péray	Rhône	1936	
Saint-Pourçain	Loire	2009	
Saint-Romain	Burgundy	1970	
Saint-Sardos	South West France	2011	upgraded to AOC (AOP) from AOVDQS as disappear as label in 2011
Saint-Véran	Burgundy	1971	
Sainte-Croix-du-Mont	Bordeaux	1936	
Sainte-Foy-Bordeaux	Bordeaux	1937	
Sancerre	Loire	1936	
Santenay	Burgundy	1970	
Saumur	Loire	1936	
Saumur-Champigny	Loire	1936	
Saumur mousseux	Loire	1976	
Saussignac	South West France	1982	
Sauternes	Bordeaux	1936	
Savennières	Loire	1952	
Savennières-Coulée-de-Serrant	Loire	1952	
Savennières-Roche-aux-Moines	Loire	1952	
Savigny-les-Beaune	Burgundy	1970	
Seyssel	Savoy	1942	
Tavel	Rhône	1936	
Tonnerre	Burgundy	2006	
Touraine	Loire	1939	Originally called Coteaux de Touraine, changed to Touraine in 1953
Touraine-Amboise	Loire	1939	
Touraine-Azay-le-Rideau	Loire	1939	
Touraine-Mesland	Loire	1939	
Touraine Noble Joué	Loire	2001	
Tursan	South West France	2011	upgraded to AOC (AOP) from AOVDQS as disappear as label in 2011
Vacqueyras	Rhône	1990	
Valençay	Loire	2004	
Vin de Savoie	Savoy	1973	
Vins d'Entraygues et du Fel	South West France	2011	upgraded to AOC (AOP) from AOVDQS as disappear as label in 2011
Vins d'Estaing	South West France	2011	upgraded to AOC (AOP) from AOVDQS as disappear as label in 2011
Vins Fins de la Côte de Nuits	Burgundy	1964	
Viré-Clessé	Burgundy	1999	Previously the two designations Mâcon-Clessé and Mâcon-Viré existed within Mâcon AOC since 1937
Vinsobres	Rhône	2006	Separate AOC in 2006, previously a part of Côtes du Rhône Villages
Volnay	Burgundy	1937	
Volnay Santenots	Burgundy	1937	
Vosne-Romanée	Burgundy	1936	
Vougeot	Burgundy	1936	
Vouvray	Loire	1936	

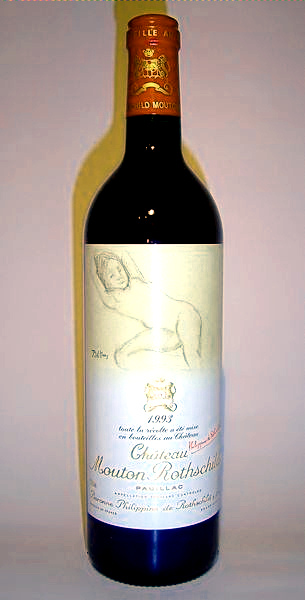
1993 Château Mouton-Rothschild, Premier Grand Cru Classé, part of the Pauillac appellation

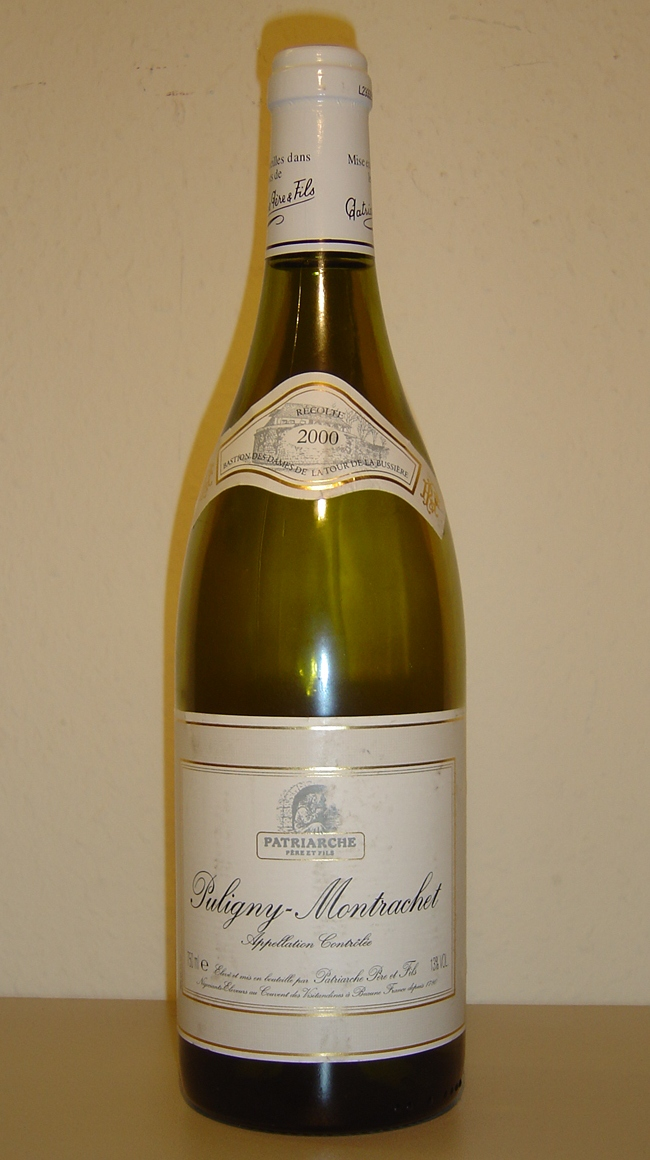
2000 Puligny-Montrachet, Burgundy, Puligny-Montrachet A.O.C.

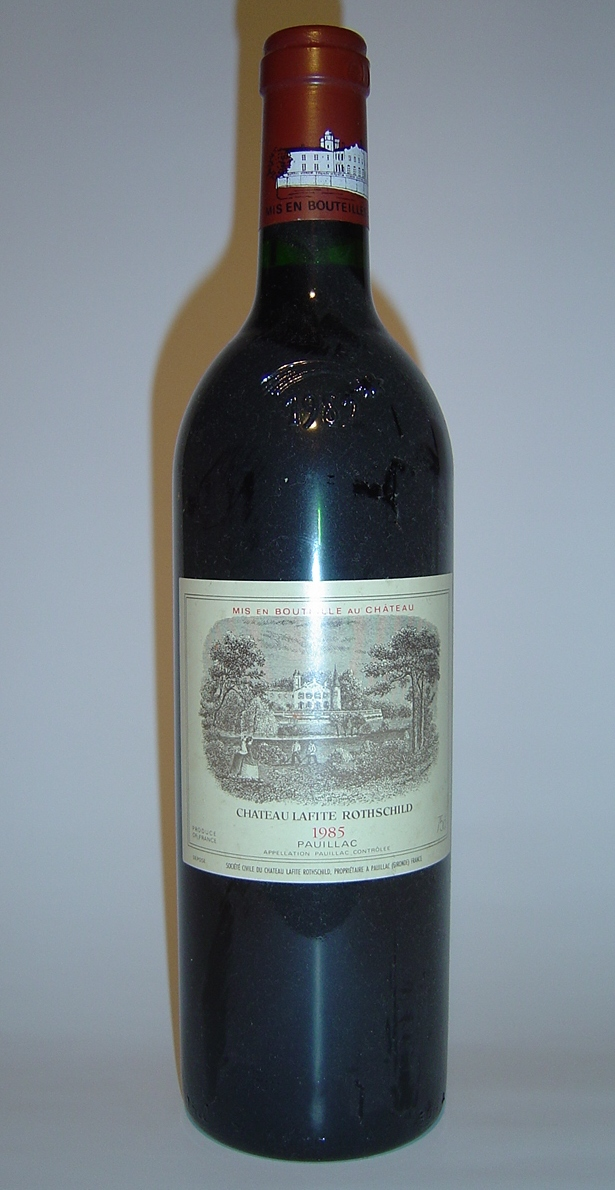
1985 Château Lafite-Rothschild, Premier Grand Cru Classé, part of the Pauillac appellation

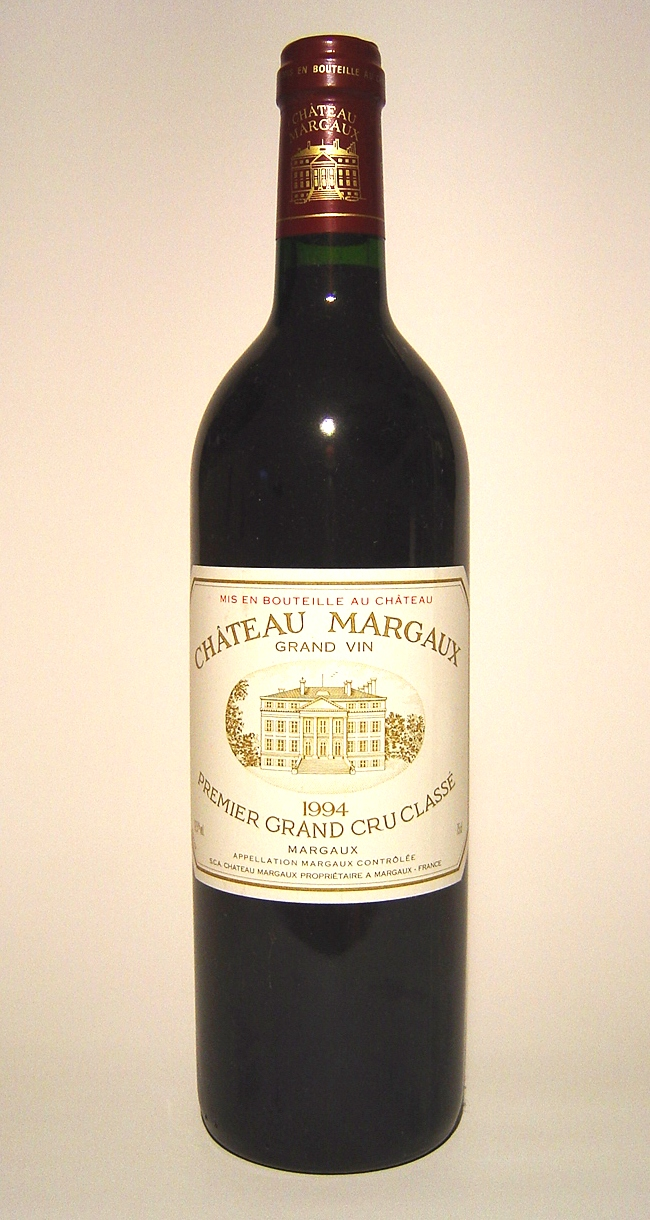
1994 Château Margaux, Premier Grand Cru Classé, part of the Margaux appellation

== See also ==
- List of Appellation d'Origine Contrôlée liqueurs and spirits
- List of VDQS wines
- List of Vins de Primeur
