= Ladoix wine =

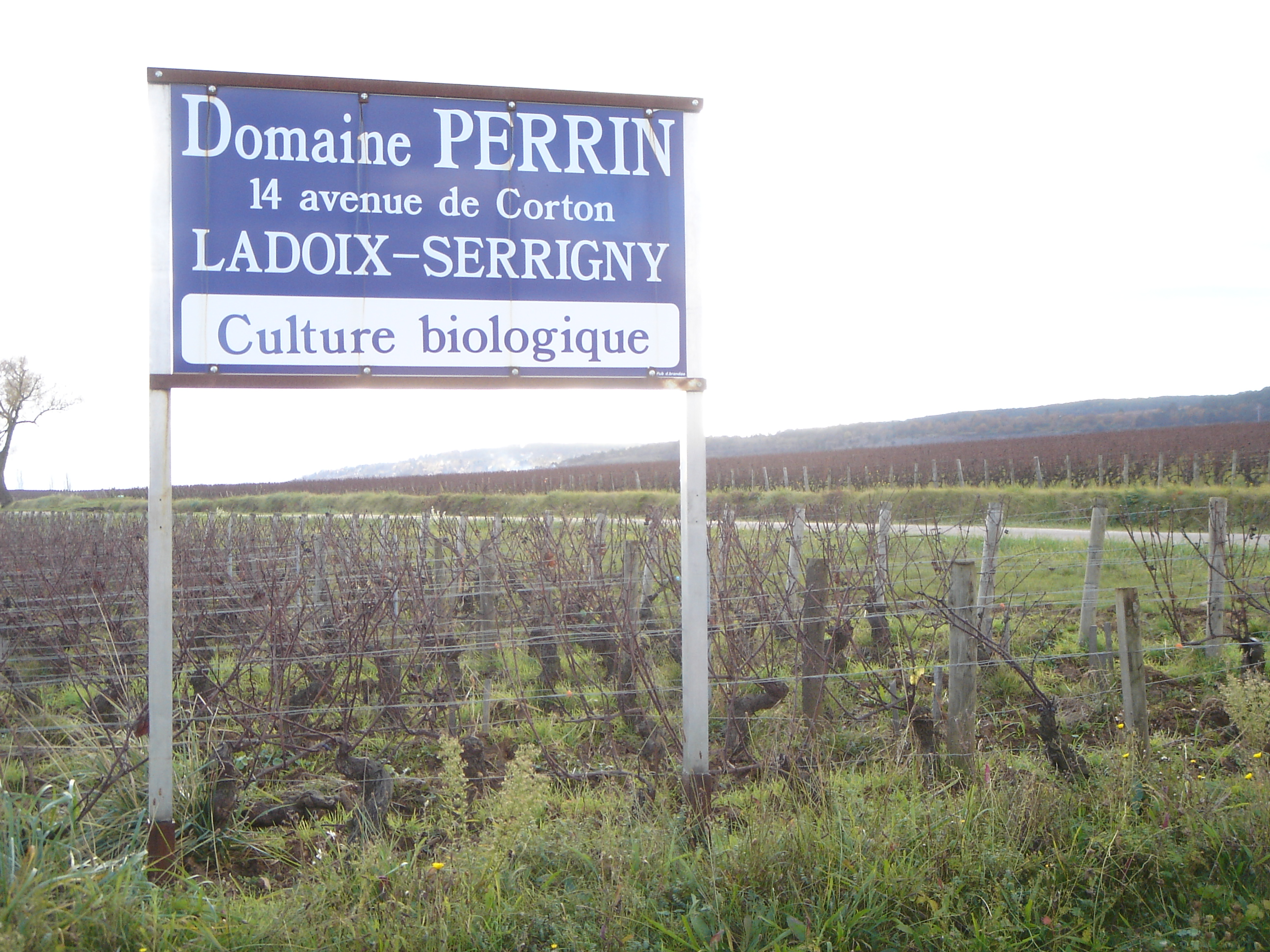
A vineyard in Ladoix-Serrigny

Ladoix wine is produced in the commune of Ladoix-Serrigny in Côte de Beaune of Burgundy, France. The Appellation d'origine contrôlée (AOC) Ladoix may be used for red and white wine with respectively Pinot noir and Chardonnay as the main grape variety. The production consists of around three-quarter red wine, and around one-quarter white wine. The northeastern part of the Corton hill is located in the commune of Ladoix-Serrigny, including vineyards of two of the three Grand Cru AOCs of the hill, Corton and Corton-Charlemagne. Some of the Premier Cru vineyards of Ladoix-Serrigny are part of the Aloxe-Corton AOC of the neighbouring village rather than of Ladoix AOC, and vinified and sold as Aloxe-Corton Premier Cru.

The AOC designation Ladoix-Serrigny can also be seen used in some instances, although this is not explicitly covered by the appellation regulations.

In 2008, there was 94 hectares (230 acres) of vineyard surface in production for Ladoix wine at village and Premier Cru level, and 4,063 hectoliter of wine was produced, of which 3,021 hectoliter red wine and 1,042 hectoliter white wine. Some 80.05 hectares (197.8 acres) of this area was used for the red wines in 2007. The total amount produced corresponds to close to 550,000 bottles, of which just over 400,000 bottles of red wine, and closer to 150,000 bottles of white wine.

For white wines, the AOC regulations allow both Chardonnay and Pinot blanc to be used, but most wines are 100% Chardonnay. The AOC regulations also allow up to 15 per cent total of Chardonnay, Pinot blanc and Pinot gris as accessory grapes in the red wines, but this not very often practiced. The allowed base yield is 40 hectoliter per hectare of red wine and 45 hectoliter per hectare for white wine. The grapes must reach a maturity of at least 10.5 per cent potential alcohol for village-level red wine, 11.0 per cent for village-level white wine and Premier Cru red wine, and 11.5 per cent for Premier Cru white wine.

== Premiers Crus ==
There are 11 climats in the Ladoix AOC classified as Premier Cru vineyards. Some of these vineyards are classified Premier Cru for both red and white wines, while some hold the classification for red wines only or white wines only. The wines of these vineyards are designated Ladoix Premier Cru + vineyard name, or may labelled just Ladoix Premier Cru, in which case it is possible to blend wine from several Premier Cru vineyards within the AOC.

In 2007, 23.98 hectares (59.3 acres) of the total Ladoix vineyard surface consisted of Premier Cru vineyards, of which 16.26 hectares (40.2 acres) red and 7.72 hectares (19.1 acres) white Ladoix Premier Cru. The annual production of Premier Cru wine, as a five-year average, is 684 hectoliter of red wine and 416 hectoliter of white wine.

The climats of the AOC classified as Premiers Crus, per wine style, are:

Red and white wines:

- La Corvée
- Le Clou d’Orge
- La Micaude
- Basses Mourottes
- Hautes Mourottes

Red wines only:

- Les Buis
- Les Joyeuses
- Bois Roussot

White wines only:

- Les Grêchons
- En Naget
- Le Rognet et Corton

The climats located within the commune of Ladoix-Serrigny which are classified as Aloxe-Corton Premiers Crus (red wines only) are those listed below. They are located just outside the village of Ladoix-Serrigny.

- Clos des Maréchaudes
- La Maréchaude
- Les Petites Lolières
- Les Moutottes
- La Coutière
- La Toppe au Vert

== Grands Crus ==
The Grand Cru AOCs of the Corton hill are partially overlapping, and are situated in three communes; Pernand-Vergelesses, Aloxe-Corton (the largest part) and Ladoix-Serrigny. The two appellations which partially fall within Ladoix-Serrigny are Corton AOC, which may be used for both red and white wine, and Corton-Charlemagne for white wine.
