= Pernand-Vergelesses wine =

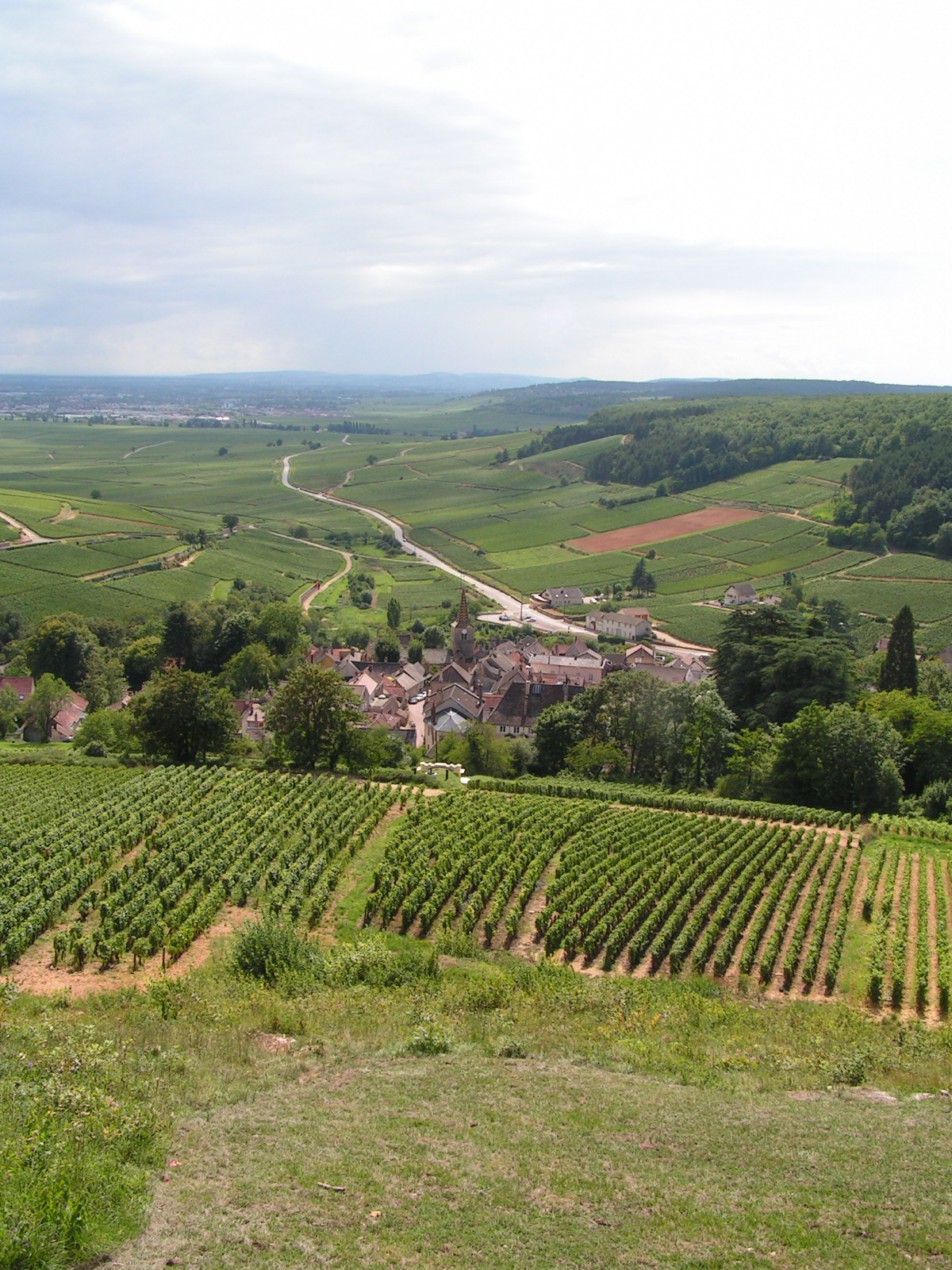
View from the north over Pernand-Vergelesses and its vineyards. On the left, just beyond the village, is the foot of the Corton hill with Grand Cru vineyards. On the right beyond the village are various Pernand-Vergelesses Premier Cru vineyards.

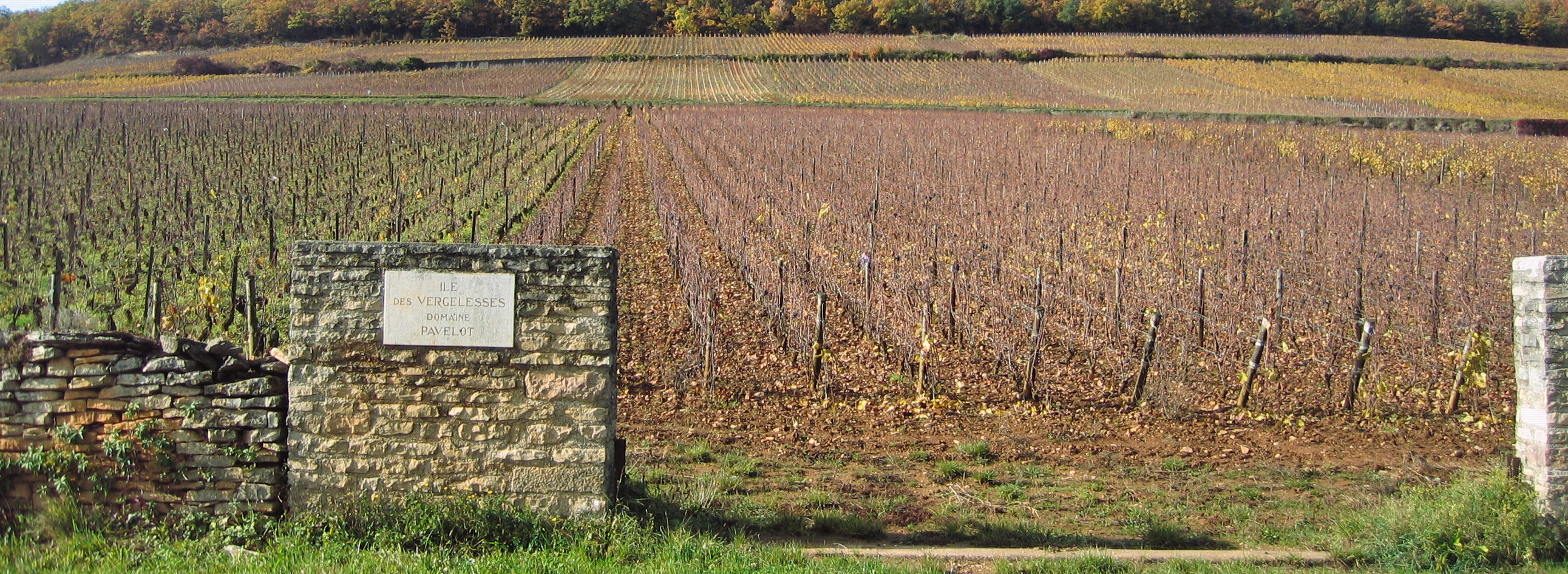
The Premier Cru vineyard Île de Vergelesses.

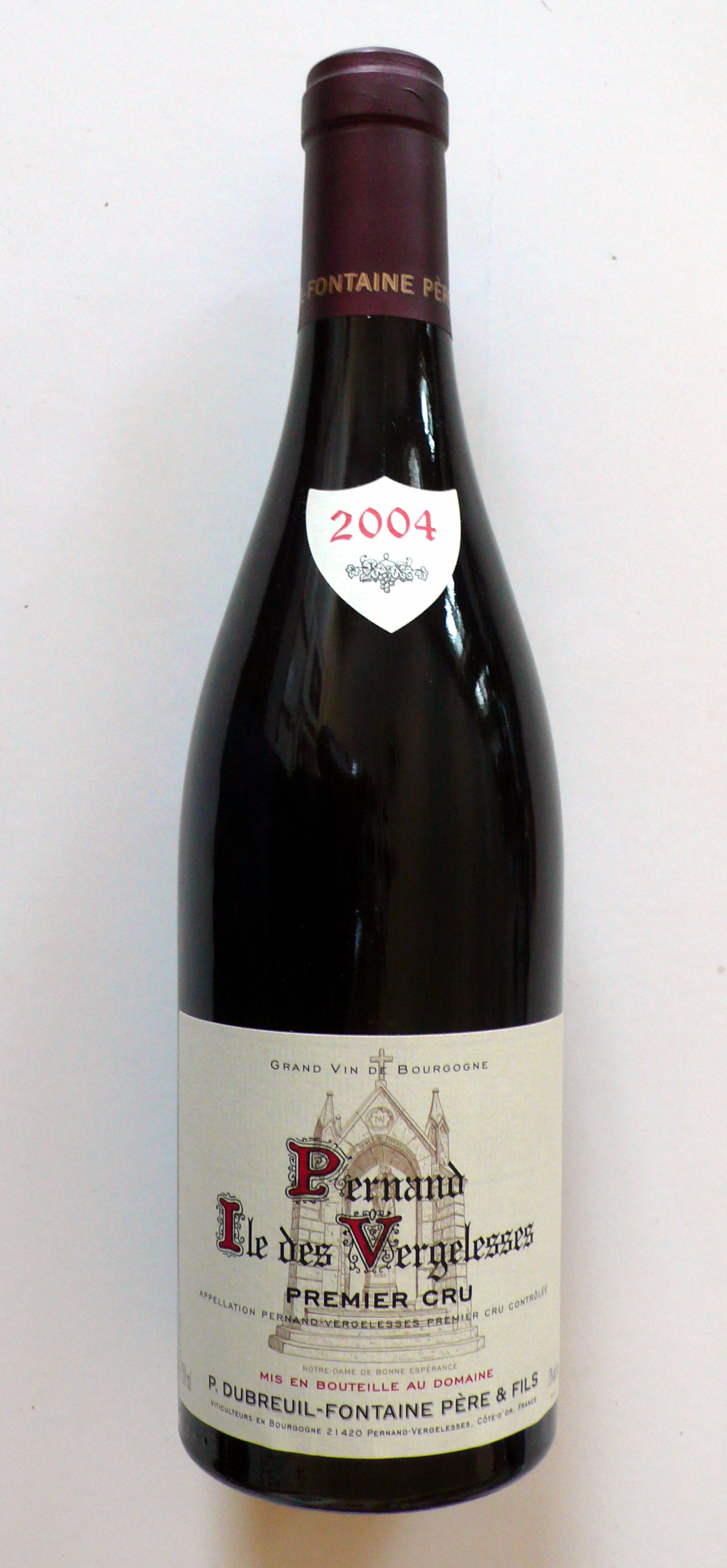
A bottle of Pernand-Vergelesses wine from the Premier Cru vineyard Île de Vergelesses.

Pernand-Vergelesses wine (French pronunciation: [pɛʁnɑ̃ vɛʁʒəlɛs]) is produced in the commune of Pernand-Vergelesses in Côte de Beaune of Burgundy. The Appellation d'origine contrôlée (AOC) Pernand-Vergelesses may be used for red and white wine, with Pinot noir and Chardonnay as the main grape variety, respectively. The production consists of a little more than half red wine, and slightly less than half white wine. The western side of the Corton hill is located in the commune, including vineyards of all three Grand Cru AOCs of the hill: Corton, Corton-Charlemagne and Charlemagne.

In 2008, there were 135.32 hectares (334.4 acres) of vineyard surface in production for Pernand-Vergelesses wine at village and Premier Cru level, and 5,638 hectoliters of wine were produced, of which 2,958 hectoliters were red wine and 2,680 hectoliters were white wine. Some 81.54 hectares (201.5 acres) of this area were used for the red wines in 2007. The total amount produced corresponds to around 750,000 bottles, including almost 400,000 bottles of red wine and a little over 350,000 bottles of white wine.

For white wines, the AOC regulations allow both Chardonnay and Pinot blanc to be used, but most wines are 100 percent Chardonnay. The AOC regulations also allow up to 15 percent total of Chardonnay, Pinot blanc and Pinot gris as accessory grapes in the red wines, but this not very often practiced. The allowed base yield is 40 hectoliters per hectare of red wine and 45 hectoliters per hectare for white wine. The grapes must reach a maturity of at least 10.5 percent potential alcohol for village-level red wine, 11.0 percent for village-level white wine and Premier Cru red wine, and 11.5 percent for Premier Cru white wine.

== Premiers Crus ==
There are eight climats in Pernand-Vergelesses classified as Premier Cru vineyards. They belong to two groups: One group is situated south of the village, in the direction of Savigny-lès-Beaune, and may produce both red and white Premier Cru wines; the other group is located immediately to the northeast of the village, on a hill adjacent to the Corton hill, and may produce only white Premier Cru wine.

The wines of these vineyards are designated Pernand-Vergelesses Premier Cru + vineyard name, or may be labelled just Pernand-Vergelesses Premier Cru, in which case it is possible to blend wine from several Premier Cru vineyards within the AOC.

In 2007, 61.70 hectares (152.5 acres) of the total Pernand-Vergelesses vineyard surface consisted of Premier Cru vineyards, with 44.15 hectares (109.1 acres) producing red and 17.55 hectares (43.4 acres) producing white Pernand-Vergelesses Premier Cru. The annual production of Premier Cru wine, as a five-year average, is 1,669 hectoliters of red wine and 738 hectoliters of white wine.

The climats classified as Premiers Crus are:

- Sous Frétille (white wine only)
- Clos Berthet (white wine only; a monopole owned by Domaine Dubreuil-Fontaine)
- Clos du Village (white wine only)
- Creux de la Net
- En Caradeux
- Île des Vergelesses
- Les Fichots
- Les Vergelesses

== Grands Crus ==
The three Grand Cru AOCs of the Corton hill are partially overlapping, and are situated in three communes: Pernand-Vergelesses, Aloxe-Corton (the largest part) and Ladoix-Serrigny. While Corton in general is an AOC for both red and white wine, the Corton vineyards situated within Pernand-Vergelesses may only use the Corton AOC for red wine. Corton-Charlemagne and Charlemagne are white appellations only.
