= Auxey-Duresses wine =

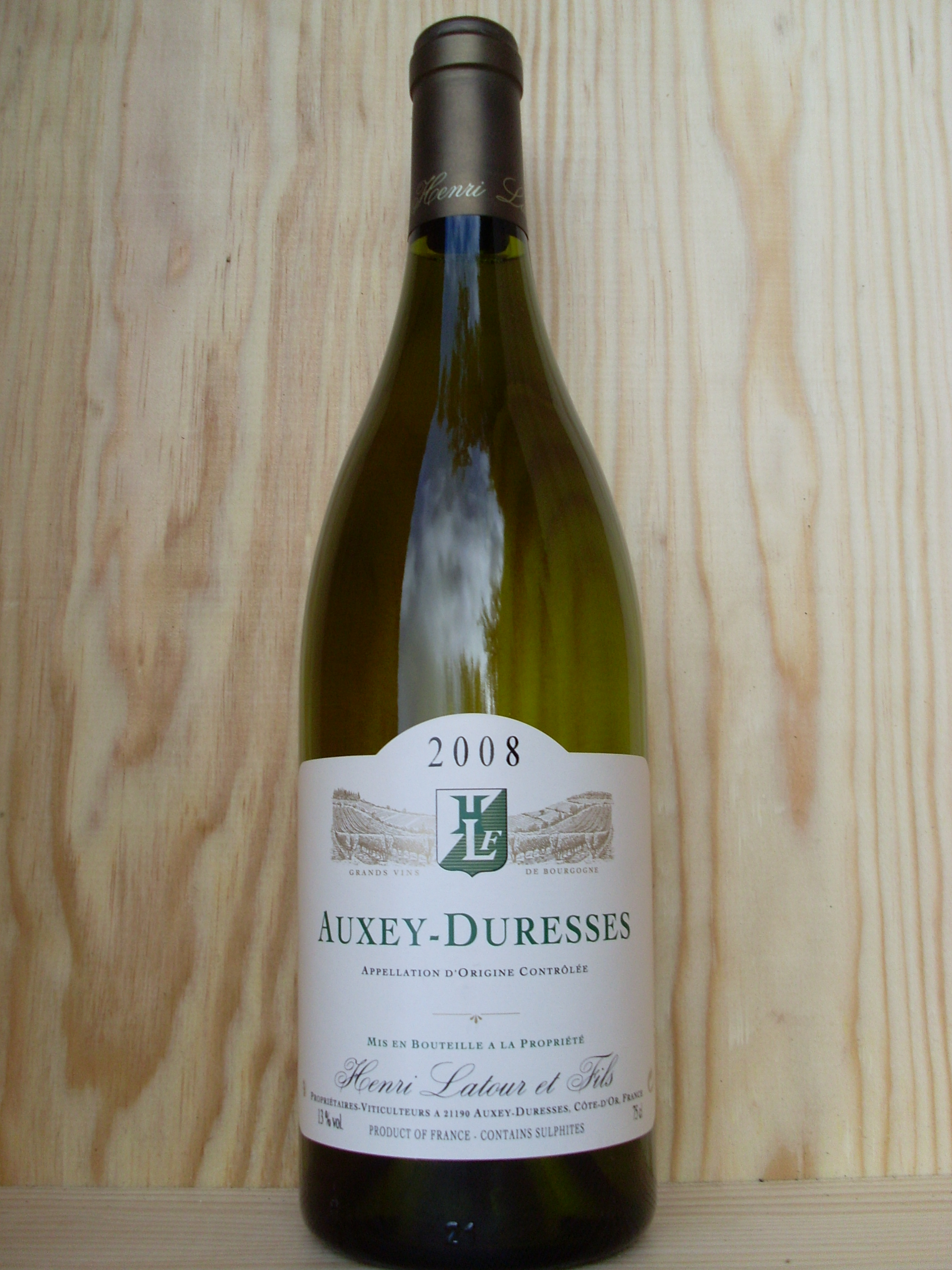
A bottle of white Auxey-Duresses from the producer Domaine Herni Latour.

Auxey-Duresses wine is produced in the commune of Auxey-Duresses in Côte de Beaune of Burgundy. The Appellation d'origine contrôlée (AOC) Auxey-Duresses may be used for red and white wine with respectively Pinot noir and Chardonnay as the main grape variety. The production consists of around two-thirds red wine, and one-third white wine. There are no Grand Cru vineyards within Auxey-Duresses. The AOC Auxey-Duresses was created in 1970. Before the introduction of the appellation system in the 1930s, wines from this village were probably sold under the names of the more famous neighbors Volnay and Meursault. Later, the wines have been sold as Côte de Beaune-Villages, but it has progressively become more common to actually use the Auxey-Duresses AOC for the wines.

== Production ==
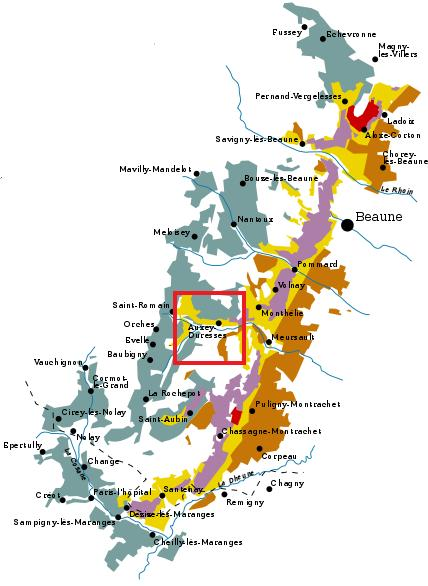
The Auxey-Duresses region (highlighted in red box) borders the Côte de Beaune wine regions of Monthelie, Meursault and Saint-Romain.

In 2008, there was 134.61 hectares (332.6 acres) of vineyard surface in production for Auxey-Duresses wine at village and Premier Cru level, and 5,838 hectoliter of wine was produced, of which 3,919 hectoliter red wine and 1,919 hectoliter white wine. Some 96.21 hectares (237.7 acres) of this area was used for the red wines in 2007. The total amount produced corresponds to almost 800,000 bottles, of which slightly over 500,000 bottles of red wine and just over 250,000 bottles of white wine.

== Regulations ==
For white wines, the AOC regulations allow both Chardonnay and Pinot blanc to be used, but most wines are 100% Chardonnay. The AOC regulations also allow up to 15 per cent total of Chardonnay, Pinot blanc and Pinot gris as accessory grapes in the red wines, but this not very often practiced. The allowed base yield is 40 hectoliter per hectare of red wine and 45 hectoliter per hectare for white wine. The grapes must reach a maturity of at least 10.5 per cent potential alcohol for village-level red wine, 11.0 per cent for village-level white wine and Premier Cru red wine, and 11.5 per cent for Premier Cru white wine.

== Premiers Crus ==
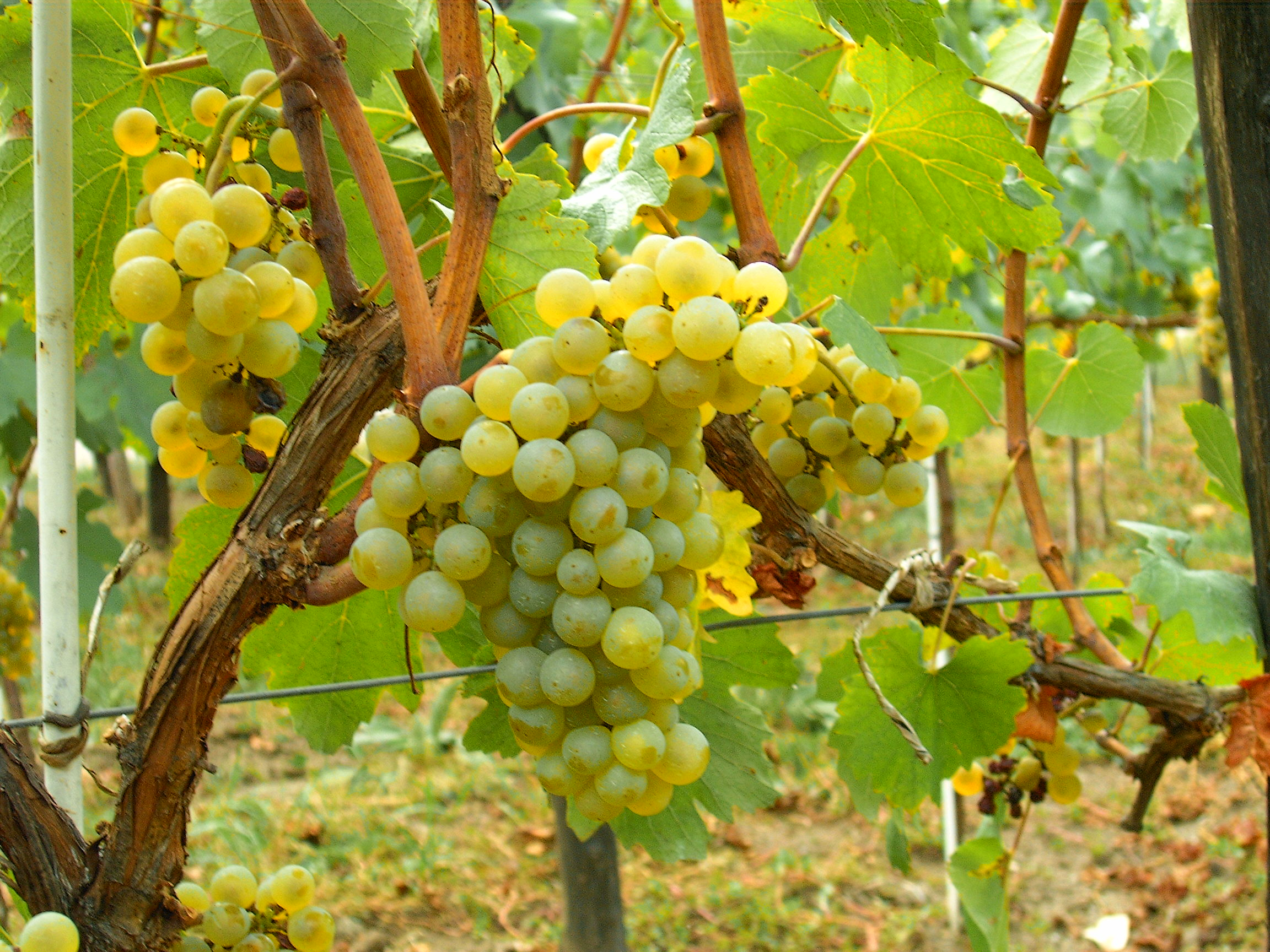
Chardonnay is the primary grape for the white wines of Auxey-Duresses

There are nine climats in Auxey-Duresses classified as Premier Cru vineyards, all located on a roughly south-facing slope of the hill la Montagne du Burdon, close to the border of Monthélie. The wines of these vineyards are designated Auxey-Duresses Premier Cru + vineyard name, or may labelled just Auxey-Duresses Premier Cru, in which case it is possible to blend wine from several Premier Cru vineyards within the AOC.

In 2007, 28.63 hectares (70.7 acres) of the total Auxey-Duresses vineyard surface consisted of Premier Cru vineyards, of which 25.83 hectares (63.8 acres) red and 2.80 hectares (6.9 acres) white Auxey-Duresses Premier Cru. The annual production of Premier Cru wine, as a five-year average, is 1,121 hectoliter of red wine and 103 hectoliter of white wine.

The climats classified as Premiers Crus are:

- Climat du Val
- Clos du Val
- Les Bréterins
- La Chapelle
- Reugne
- Les Duresses
- Bas des Duresses
- Les Grands Champs
- Les Écusseaux
