= Monthélie wine =

Wine from Burgundy

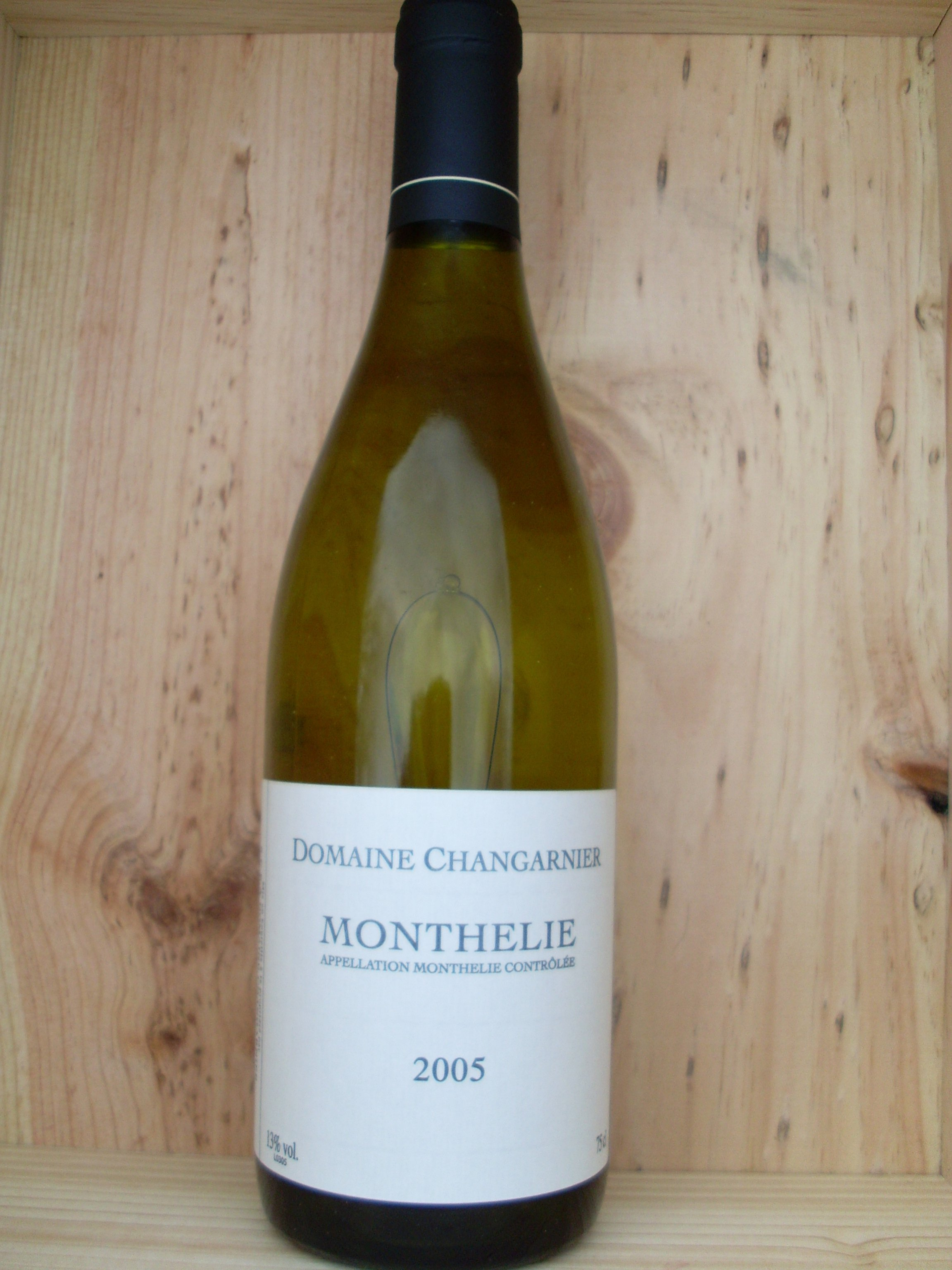
A bottle of white Monthélie wine.

Monthélie wine is produced in the commune of Monthelie in Côte de Beaune of Burgundy. The Appellation d'origine contrôlée (AOC) Monthélie may be used for red and white wine with respectively Pinot noir and Chardonnay as the main grape variety. The production consists of more than 85% red wine, and less than 15% white wine. There are no Grand Cru vineyards within Monthelie.

In 2008, there was 119.34 hectares (294.9 acres) of vineyard surface in production for Monthélie wine at village and Premier Cru level, and 4,745 hectoliter of wine was produced, of which 4,148 hectoliter red wine and 597 hectoliter white wine. Some 107.90 hectares (266.6 acres) of this area was used for the red wines in 2007. The total amount produced corresponds to a little over 600,000 bottles, of which around 550,000 bottles of red wine and around 80,000 bottles of white wine.

For white wines, the AOC regulations allow both Chardonnay and Pinot blanc to be used, but most wines are 100% Chardonnay. The AOC regulations also allow up to 15 per cent total of Chardonnay, Pinot blanc and Pinot gris as accessory grapes in the red wines, but this not very often practiced. The allowed base yield is 40 hectoliter per hectare of red wine and 45 hectoliter per hectare for white wine. The grapes must reach a maturity of at least 10.5 per cent potential alcohol for village-level red wine, 11.0 per cent for village-level white wine and Premier Cru red wine, and 11.5 per cent for Premier Cru white wine.

== Premiers Crus ==
There are 15 climats in Monthelie classified as Premier Cru vineyards, either located close to the border to Auxey-Duresses, or located east of the village of Monthelie, close to the border to Volnay. The wines of these vineyards are designated Monthélie Premier Cru + vineyard name, or may labelled just Monthélie Premier Cru, in which case it is possible to blend wine from several Premier Cru vineyards within the AOC.

In 2007, 35.57 hectares (87.9 acres) of the total Monthélie vineyard surface consisted of Premier Cru vineyards, of which 33.94 hectares (83.9 acres) red and 1.63 hectares (4.0 acres) white Monthélie Premier Cru. The annual production of Premier Cru wine, as a five-year average, is 1,182 hectoliter of red wine and 96 hectoliter of white wine.

The climats classified as Premiers Crus are:

- Les Riottes
- Sur la Velle
- Le Meix Bataille
- Le Clos Gauthey
- Les Vignes Rondes
- Le Cas Rougeot
- La Taupine
- Les Champs Fulliot
- Le Village
- Le Château Gaillard
- Les Duresses
- La Barbiére
- Le Clou des Chênes
- Les Clous
- Le Clos des Toisières
