= Aloxe-Corton wine =

Appellation d'origine contrôlée

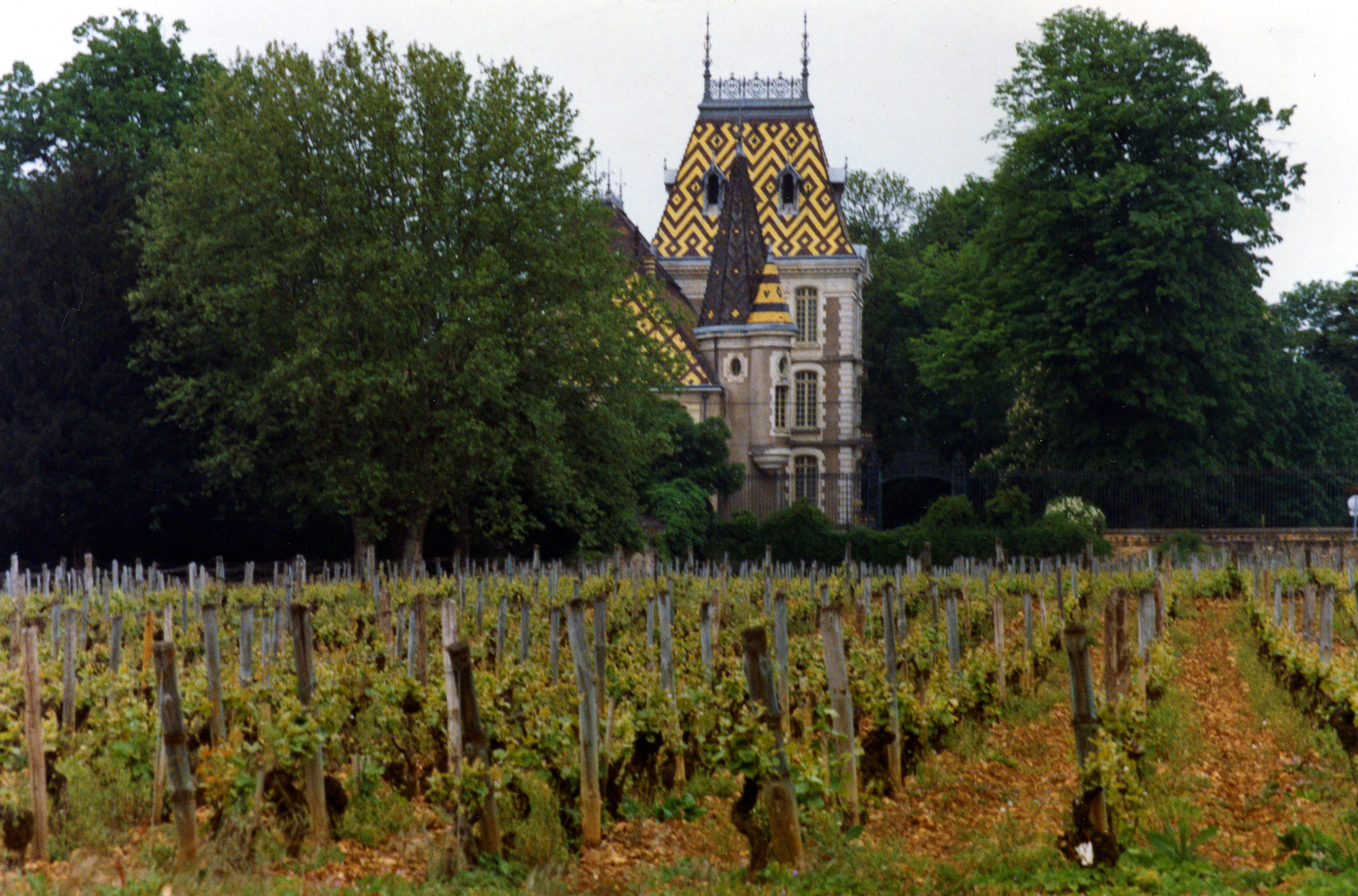
Vineyards on the outskirts of the village of Aloxe-Corton. These vineyards are classified as Premier Cru.

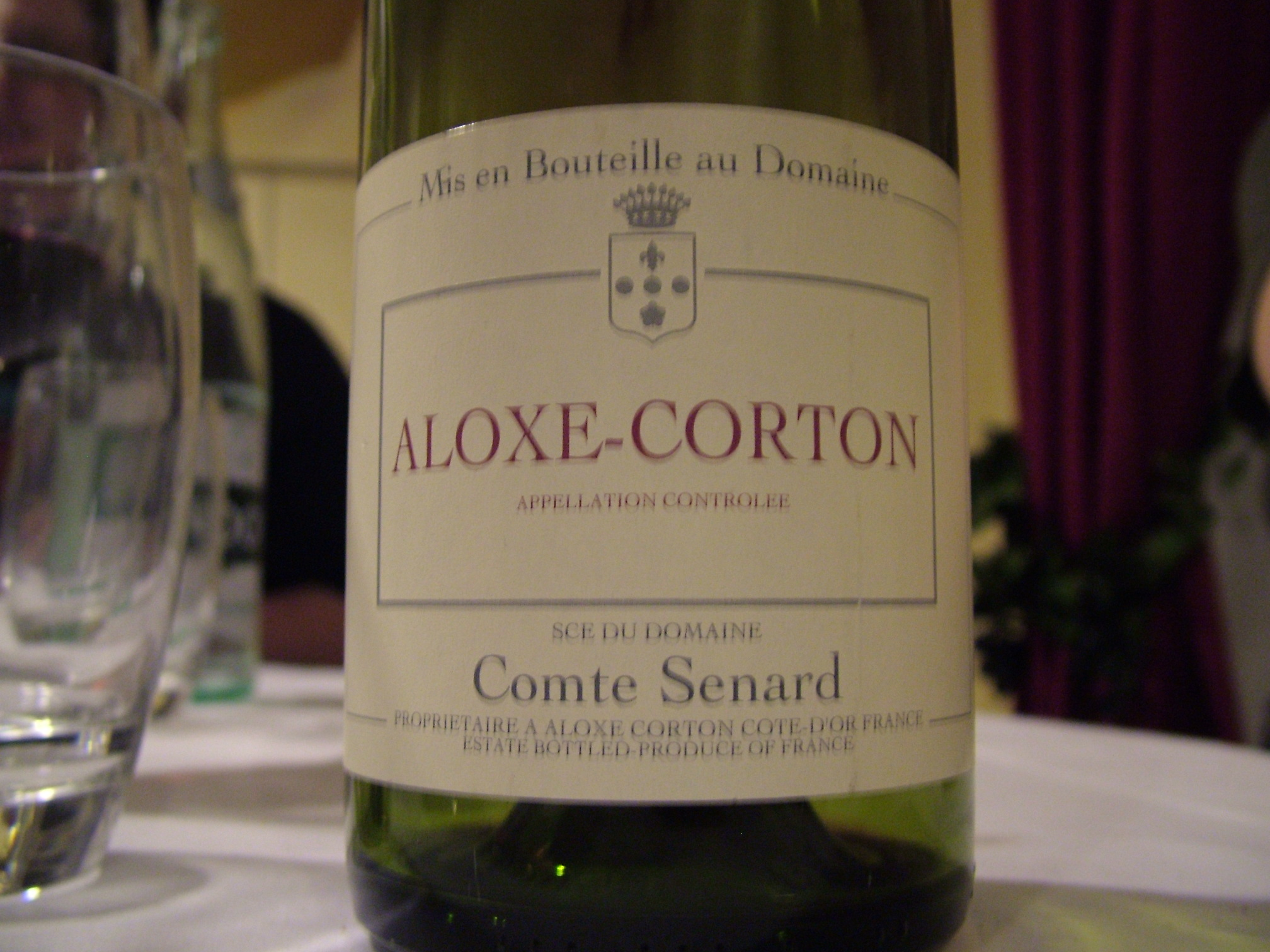
A bottle of Aloxe-Corton wine.

Aloxe-Corton wine (French pronunciation: [alɔs kɔʁtɔ̃]) is produced in the communes of Aloxe-Corton and Ladoix-Serrigny in Côte de Beaune of Burgundy. The appellation d'origine contrôlée (AOC) Aloxe-Corton may be used for red and white wine with respectively Pinot noir and Chardonnay as the main grape variety. The production consists of almost only red wine, around 98 per cent, and only around two per cent white wine. The southern and eastern side of the Corton hill is located in the commune of Aloxe-Corton, including vineyards of all three Grand Cru AOCs of the hill; Corton, Corton-Charlemagne and Charlemagne, and its northeastern part in the commune of Ladoix-Serrigny. The major part of the Corton hill is located within Aloxe-Corton. The AOC was created in 1938.

In 2008, there was 117.78 hectares (291.0 acres) of vineyard surface in production for Aloxe-Corton wine at village and Premier Cru level, and 4,382 hectoliter of wine was produced, of which 4,301 hectoliter red wine and 81 hectoliter white wine. Only some 1.40 hectares (3.5 acres) of this area was used for the white wines in 2007. The total amount produced corresponds to close to 600,000 bottles, of which around 10,000 bottles of white wine.

For white wines, the AOC regulations allow both Chardonnay and Pinot blanc to be used, but most wines are 100% Chardonnay. The AOC regulations also allow up to 15 per cent total of Chardonnay, Pinot blanc and Pinot gris as accessory grapes in the red wines, but this is not very often practiced. The allowed base yield is 40 hectoliter per hectare of red wine and 45 hectoliter per hectare for white wine. The grapes must reach a maturity of at least 10.5 per cent potential alcohol for village-level red wine, 11.0 per cent for village-level white wine and Premier Cru red wine, and 11.5 per cent for Premier Cru white wine.

Aloxe-Corton is featured in the Fawlty Towers episode The Hotel Inspectors.

== Premiers Crus ==
There are 13 climats in Aloxe-Corton classified as Premier Cru vineyards. These vineyards are located just below the Corton hill, on slightly flatter land. The vineyards located in the commune of Ladoix-Serrigny are located just outside the village of Ladoix-Serrigny and uphill (to the west). The wines of these vineyards are designated Aloxe-Corton Premier Cru + vineyard name, or may labelled just Aloxe-Corton Premier Cru, in which case it is possible to blend wine from several Premier Cru vineyards within the AOC.

In 2007, 38.08 hectares (94.1 acres) of the total Aloxe-Corton vineyard surface consisted of Premier Cru vineyards, all of them for red wine only. The annual production of Premier Cru wine, as a five-year average, is 1,669 hectoliters of red wine and 738 hectoliters of white wine.

The climats of the AOC located within the commune of Aloxe-Corton and classified as Premiers Crus are:

- Les Valozières
- Les Paulands
- Les Maréchaudes
- Les Chaillots
- Les Fournières
- Clos du Chapître
- Les Guérets
- Les Vercots

The climats of the AOC located within the commune of Ladoix-Serrigny and classified as Premiers Crus are:

- Clos des Maréchaudes
- La Maréchaude
- Les Petites Lolières
- Les Moutottes
- La Coutière
- La Toppe au Vert

== Grands Crus ==
The three Grand Cru AOCs of the Corton hill are partially overlapping, and are situated in three communes; Pernand-Vergelesses, Aloxe-Corton (the largest part) and Ladoix-Serrigny. Corton AOC may be used for both red and white wine, and Corton-Charlemagne and Charlemagne are white appellations only.

== Maximum and minimum alcoholic strength by volume ==
AOC	Red	Red	White	White
Alcoholic strength by volume	minimum	maximum	minimum	maximum
Village	10,5 %	13,5 %	11 %	14 %
Premier cru	11 %	14 %	11,5 %	14,5 %

Aloxe-Corton wines have a fairly dark color, color ruby or garnet; nose and mouth are usually marked by red and black fruits, robust and structured. Serve between 15 and 17 °C. Keeps between 5 and 15 years of age.
