= Jasnières =

Appellation d'Origine Contrôlée for white wine in Loire Valley, France

- Wine region
- Type: AOC
- Year established: 1937
- Country: France
- Soil conditions: calcareous-clayey and clay-silicious on tuffeau chalk
- Size of planted vineyards: 65 hectares
- Grapes produced: Chenin blanc

Jasnières (French pronunciation: [ʒanjɛʁ]) is an Appellation d'Origine Contrôlée (AOC) for white wine from the Loire Valley region of France.

== Profile ==
The area of Jasnières AOC is situated in the Sarthe department of the Loire Valley, and covers 65 hectares (160 acres) of calcareous-clay hillsides, all facing south or south-east.

Jasnières wines are dry white wines produced from Chenin blanc grapes. Red wines are made from Pineau d’Aunis and Cabernet Franc.
