= Chapelle-Chambertin =

Vineyard for red wine

Coordinates: 47°12′56″N 4°58′07″E

Chapelle-Chambertin is an Appellation d'origine contrôlée (AOC) and Grand Cru vineyard for red wine in the Côte de Nuits subregion of Burgundy, with Pinot noir as the main grape variety. It is located in the southern part of the commune of Gevrey-Chambertin and on the lower hillside east of Chambertin-Clos de Bèze (on the other side of the Route des Grands Crus) and north of Griotte-Chambertin. The AOC was created in 1937.

== Wine style ==
The wines from Chapelle-Chambertin are known to have some of the lightest coloring of all the Gevrey-Chambertin grand crus. The wines tend to be reliant on the overall quality of the vintage. Wines from this AOC are expected to hit their peak after 8 to 20 years.

== Production ==
In 2008, 5.48 hectares (13.5 acres) of vineyard surface was in production within the AOC, and 176 hectoliter of wine was produced, corresponding to just over 23,000 bottles.

== AOC regulations ==
The main grape variety for Chapelle-Chambertin is Pinot noir. The AOC regulations also allow up to 15 per cent total of Chardonnay, Pinot blanc and Pinot gris as accessory grapes, but this is practically never used for any Burgundy Grand Cru vineyard. The allowed base yield is 37 hectoliter per hectare, a minimum planting density of 9,000 vines per hectare and a minimum grape maturity of 11.5 per cent potential alcohol is required.

Within this larger grand cru are two climats whose names may appear on wine labels: la Chapelle and Les Gémeaux.

== See also ==
- List of Burgundy Grand Crus
