= Saint-Romain wine =

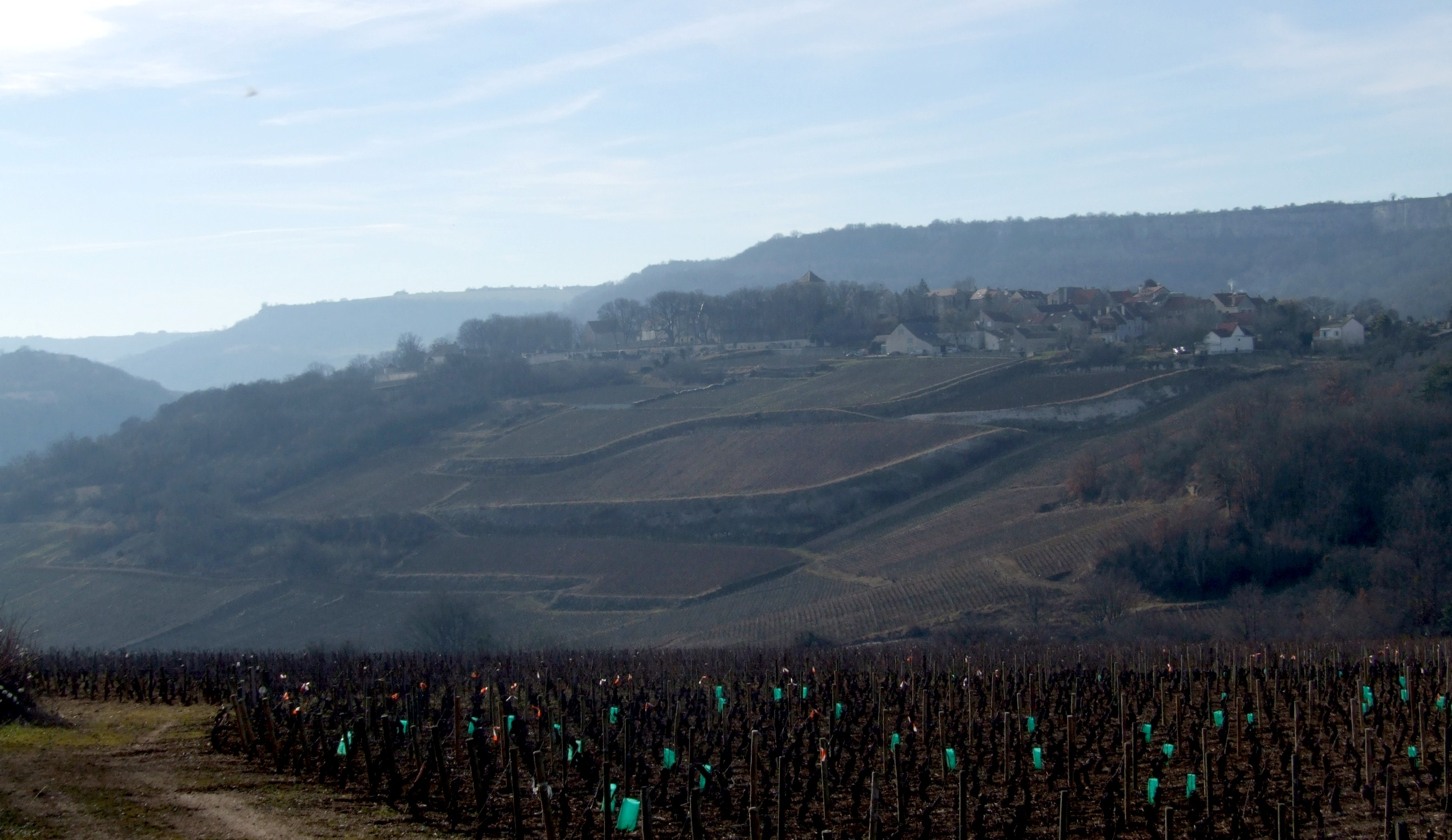
Saint-Romain vineyards in wintertime.

Saint-Romain wine is produced in the commune of Saint-Romain in Côte de Beaune of Burgundy. Rather than being situated on the main Côte d'Or escarpment, as most of the other Côte de Beaune wine villages, the vineyards of Saint-Romain are mainly located in a side valley to the west of Auxey-Duresses, in the direction of the communes and vineyards of the Hautes Côtes de Beaune. Most vineyards of Saint-Romain are located on slopes of various directions. The Appellation d'origine contrôlée (AOC) Saint-Romain may be used for red and white wine with respectively Pinot noir and Chardonnay as the main grape variety. A little more than half of the production consists of white wine. There are no Grand Cru and no Premier Cru vineyards within Saint-Romain.

== Production ==
In 2008, there was 96.25 hectares (237.8 acres) of vineyard surface in production for Saint-Romain wine, and 3,897 hectoliters of wine were produced, of which 1,779 hectoliters were red wine and 2,118 hectoliters were white wine. Some 43.82 hectares (108.3 acres) of this area was used for the red wines in 2007. The total amount produced corresponds to just over 500,000 bottles, of which slightly less than 250,000 bottles of red wine and closer to 300,000 bottles of white wine.

== Grapes and wine styles ==
For white wines, the AOC regulations allow both Chardonnay and Pinot blanc to be used, but most wines are 100% Chardonnay. The AOC regulations also allow up to 15 per cent total of Chardonnay, Pinot blanc and Pinot gris as accessory grapes in the red wines, but this not very often practiced. The allowed base yield is 40 hectoliter per hectare of red wine and 45 hectoliter per hectare for white wine. The grapes must reach a maturity of at least 10.5 per cent potential alcohol for village-level red wine, 11.0 per cent for village-level white wine and Premier Cru red wine, and 11.5 per cent for Premier Cru white wine.
