= Coteaux Bourguignons =

French wine geographic appellation

Coteaux Bourguignons is an Appellation d'origine contrôlée (AOC) for white, red and rosé wine from the region of Burgundy in France. In late 2011, it replaced the earlier appellation Bourgogne Grand Ordinaire. The name Coteaux Bourguignons translates as "Burgundian hills".

== Region of production ==
Coteaux Bourguignons is a regional-level appellation, covering the entire Burgundy region from the area around Auxerre down to Beaujolais.

== Grape varieties ==
Coteaux Bourguignons can be produced from Pinot noir, Gamay, Chardonnay, Aligoté, Tressot, and César, either as varietal wines or as blends.
