= Pommard wine =

Wine from Burgundy, France

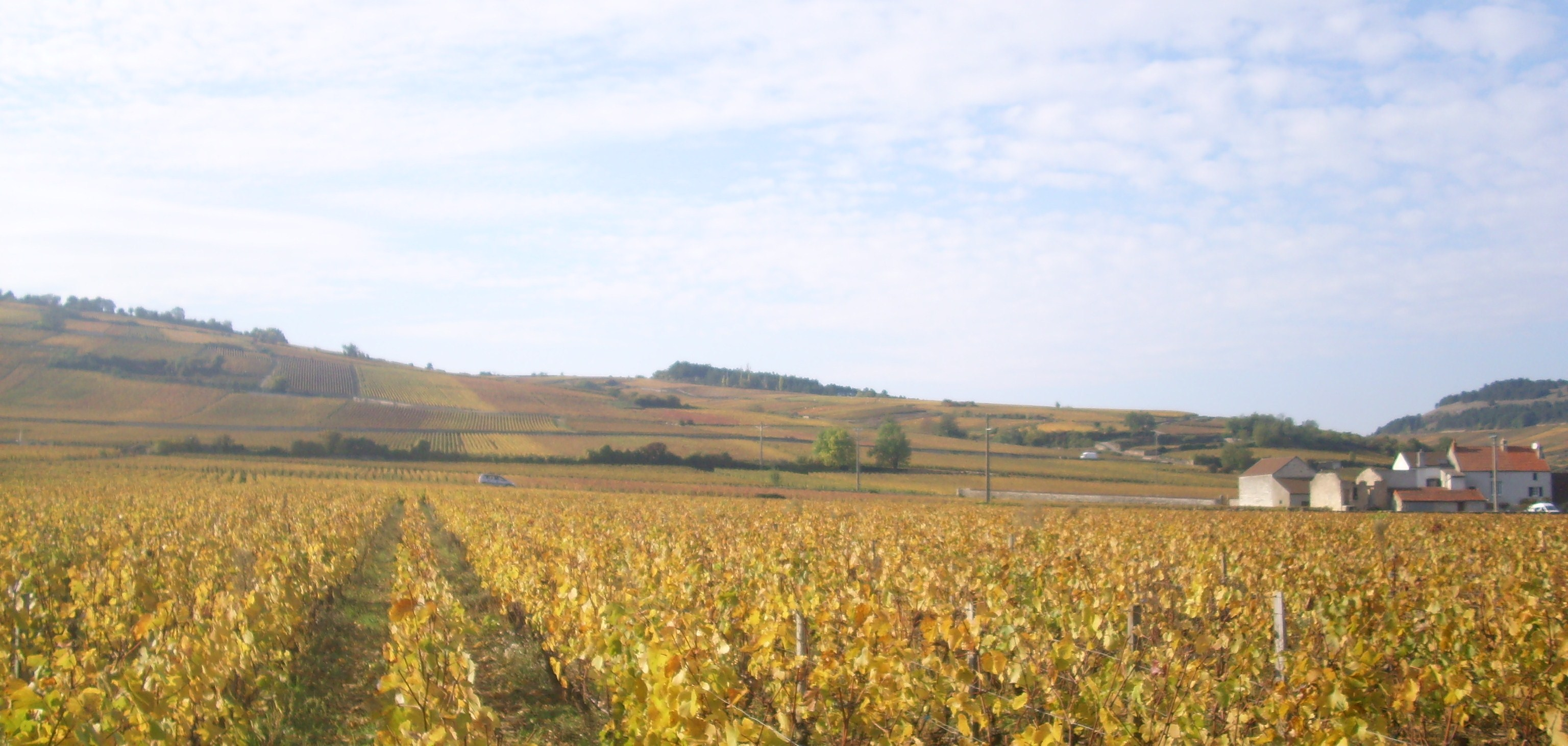
Vineyards around Pommard.

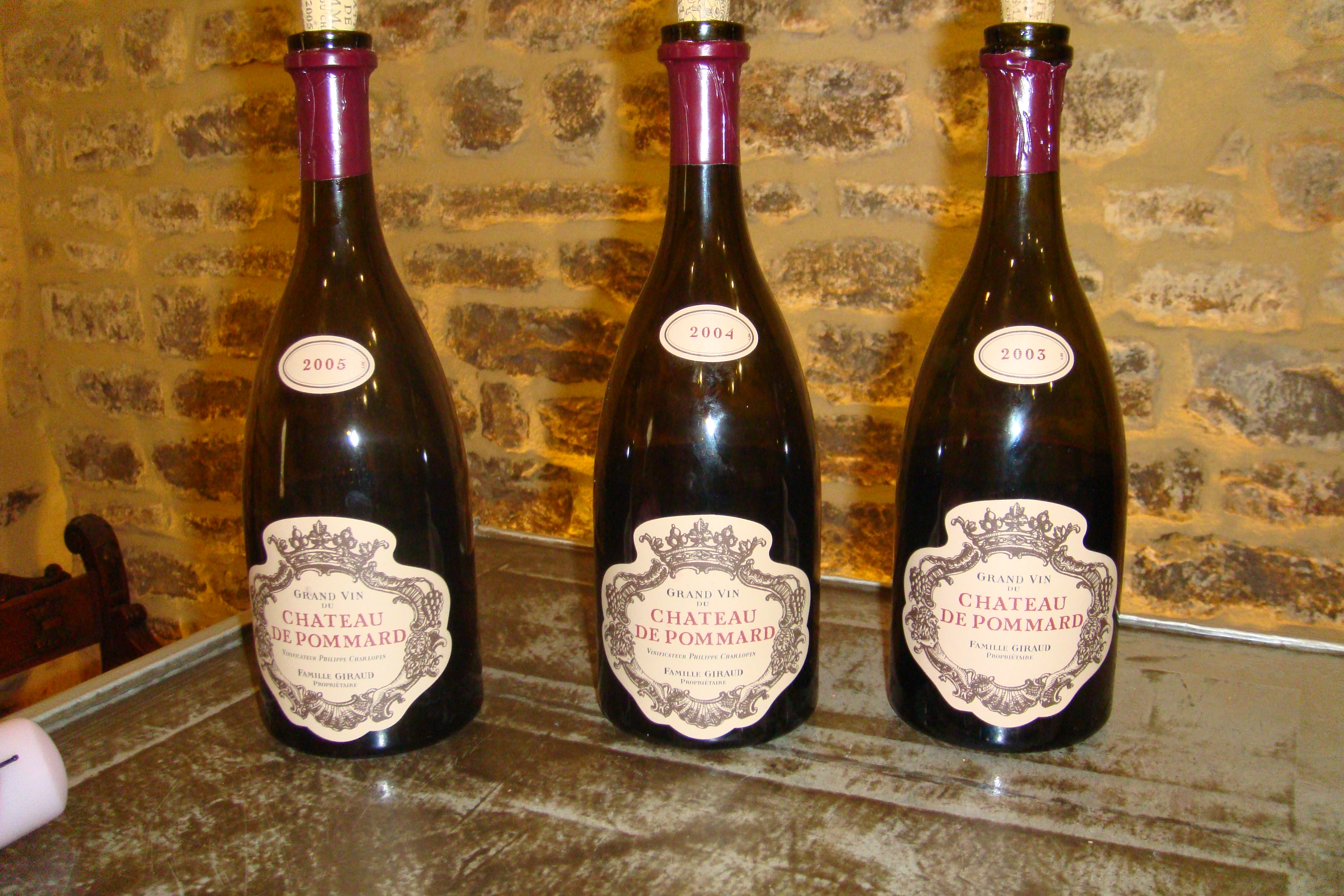
Bottles of Pommard wine.

Pommard wine is produced in the commune of Pommard in Côte de Beaune of Burgundy. The Appellation d'origine contrôlée (AOC) Pommard is only used for red wine with Pinot noir as the main grape variety. There are no Grand Cru vineyards within Pommard, but several highly regarded Premier Cru vineyards. The AOC was created in 1937.

In 2008, there were 321.69 hectares (794.9 acres) of vineyard surface in production for Pommard wine at village and Premier Cru level, and 12,892 hectoliter of wine was produced, corresponding to just over 1.7 million bottles.

The AOC regulations also allow up to 15 per cent total of Chardonnay, Pinot blanc and Pinot gris as accessory grapes in the red wines, but this is not very often practiced. The allowed base yield is 40 hectoliter per hectare. The grapes must reach a maturity of at least 10.5 per cent potential alcohol for village-level wine and 11.0 per cent for Premier Cru wine.

Pommard wines are typically among the most powerful and tannic of the Côte de Beaune wines, providing a clear contrast to the light and elegant Volnay wines from the neighboring village.

== Premiers Crus ==
There are 27 climats within the Pommard AOC that are classified as Premier Cru vineyards, which stretch in a wide band through the commune, located on both sides of the village itself and west (uphill) from the D973 road. Their wines are designated Pommard Premier Cru + vineyard name, or may be labelled just Pommard Premier Cru, in which case it is acceptable to blend wine from several Premier Cru vineyards within the AOC.

In 2007, 116.44 hectares (287.7 acres) of the total Pommard vineyard surface consisted of Premier Cru vineyards. The annual production of Premier Cru wine, as a five-year average, is 4,276 hectoliter.

The climats classified as Premiers Crus are:

- Les Rugiens-Bas
- Les Rugiens-Haut
- Les Grands-Épenots
- Les Petits-Épenots
- Clos des Épeneaux
- Les Charmots
- Les Arvelets
- La Platière
- La Chanière
- Les Pézerolles
- Les Saucilles
- Les Boucherottes
- En Largillière
- Clos de Verger
- Clos de la Commaraine
- La Refène
- Clos Blanc
- Derrière Saint-Jean
- Les Chaponnières
- Les Croix Noires
- Les Poutures
- Le Clos Micault
- Les Combes-Dessus
- Les Bertins
- Les Fremiers
- Les Jarolières
- Les Chanlins-Bas
