= Meursault wine =

French wine from Burgundy

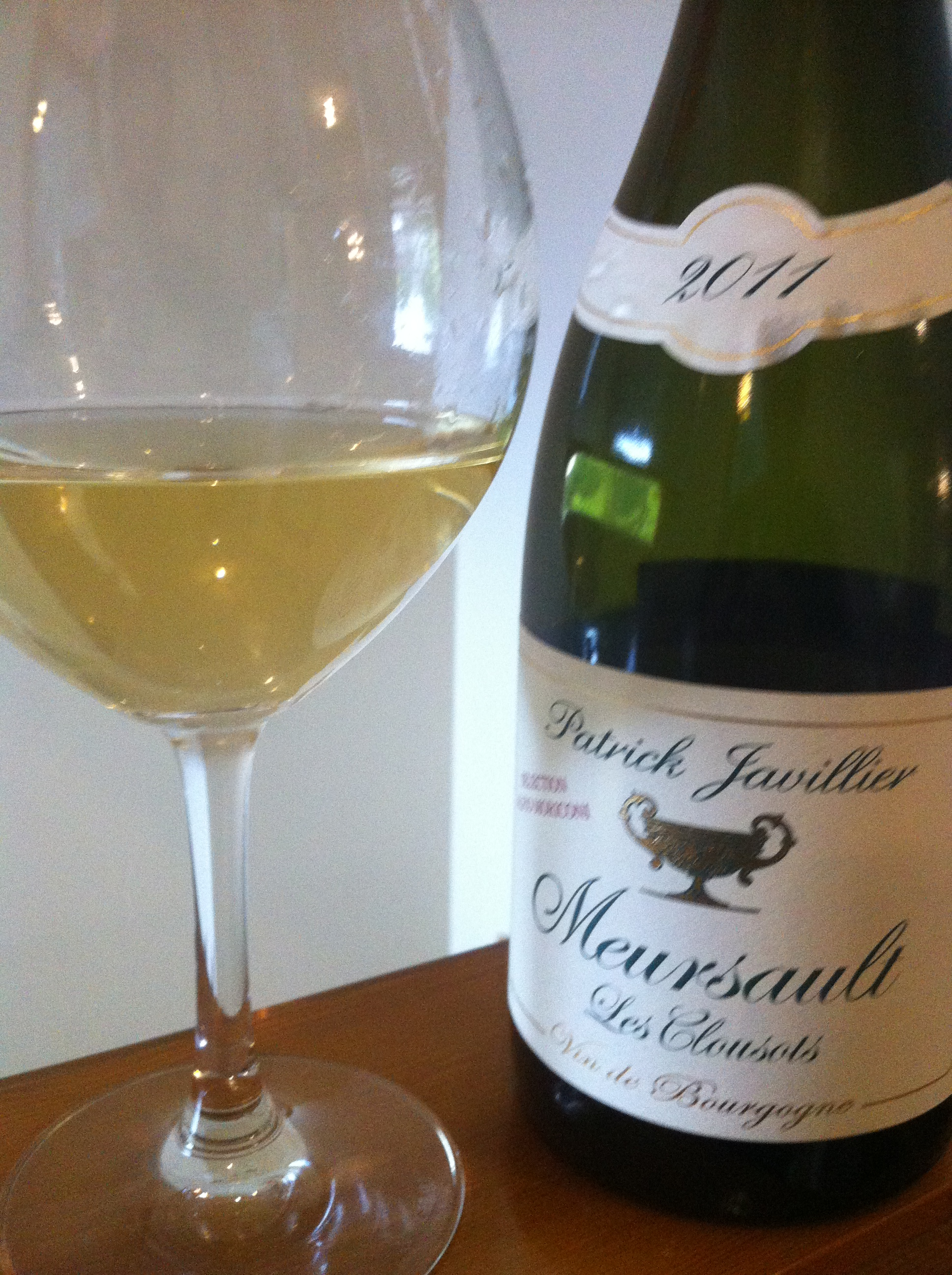
A Chardonnay from Meursault.

Meursault wine is produced in the commune of Meursault in Côte de Beaune of Burgundy. The Appellation d'origine contrôlée (AOC) Meursault may be used for white wine and red with respectively Chardonnay and Pinot noir as the main grape varieties. The production of white Meursault dominates, with around 98 per cent. There are no Grand Cru vineyards within Meursault, but several highly regarded Premier Cru vineyards.

In 2008, there were 394.05 hectares (973.7 acres) of vineyard surface in production for Meursault wine at village and Premier Cru level and 18,536 hectoliters of wine were produced, of which 18,171 hectoliters were white wine and 365 hectoliters red wine. Some 13.47 hectares (33.3 acres) of this area was used for red wines in 2007. The amount produced corresponds to almost 2.5 million bottles, of which slightly less than 50,000 bottles were red wine.

For white wines, the AOC regulations allow both Chardonnay and Pinot blanc to be used, but most wines are 100% Chardonnay. The AOC regulations also allow up to 15 per cent total of Chardonnay, Pinot blanc and Pinot gris as accessory grapes in the red wines, but this is not very often practiced. The allowed base yield is 40 hectoliters per hectare of red wine and 45 hectoliters per hectare for white wine. The grapes must reach a maturity of at least 10.5 per cent potential alcohol for village-level red wine, 11.0 per cent for village-level white wine and Premier Cru red wine, and 11.5 per cent for Premier Cru white wine.

The style of white Meursault typically has a clear oak influence and malolactic fermentation, which has led to descriptions such as "buttery" to be applied. The smell of vanilla, coconut and dill are all attributes of oak-aging; while malolactic fermentation the oenococcus oeni bacillus converts tart malic acid (the acid in apples) to smooth lactic acid (the acid in milk), resulting in a small amount of diacetyl, and creating a rounder, more creamy-feeling attributing the buttery aspect to the wine.

== Premiers Crus ==
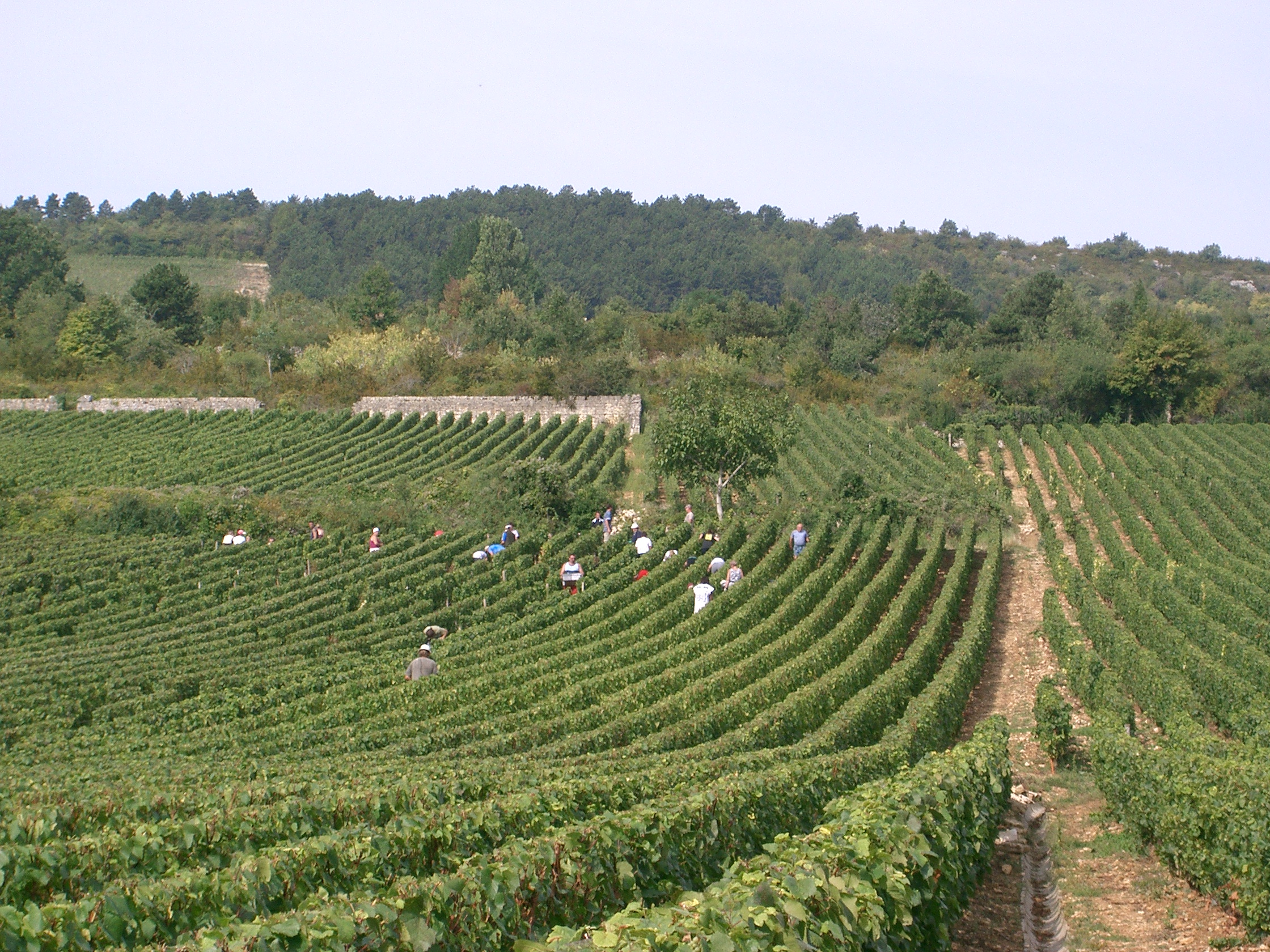
A Meursault vineyard with harvest in progress.

There are several climats in Meursault classified as Premier Cru vineyards. They consist of two groups, one to the north of the village Meursault, bordering on Volnay, and a larger group to the south of the village, in the direction of Puligny-Montrachet and Blagny. Their wines are designated Meursault Premier Cru + vineyard name, or may labelled just Meursault Premier Cru, in which case it is possible to blend wine from several Premier Cru vineyards within the AOC.

In 2007, 96.97 hectares (239.6 acres) of the total Meursault vineyard surface consisted of Premier Cru vineyards, of which 0.82 hectares (2.0 acres) red Meursault Premier Cru. The annual production of Premier Cru wine, as a five-year average is 4,706 hectoliters of white wine and 85 hectoliters of red wine.

The climats classified as Premiers Crus are:

- Les Cras
- Les Santenots Blancs (Santenots)
- Les Plures (Santenots)
- Les Santenots du Milieu (Santenots)
- Les Santenots du Dessous (Santenots) - red only
- Les Vignes Blanches (Santenots) - red only
- Charmes
- La Jeunelotte (Blagny)
- La Pièce sous le Bois (Blagny)
- Sous le Dos d’Ane (Blagny)
- Sous Blagny (Blagny)
- Perrières
- Clos des Perrières
- Genevrières
- Le Porusot
- Les Bouchères
- Les Gouttes d’Or
- Les Ravelles

Five climats in the north of the commune together make up Santenots, which also fall within the Volnay AOC and therefore can use the designation Volnay-Santenots. Volnay is more famous than Meursault for red wine, so this designation is logical to use for red wine production. Four climats in the south of the commune are also entitled to the Blagny AOC.
