= Ladoix-Serrigny =

Commune in France

- Commune
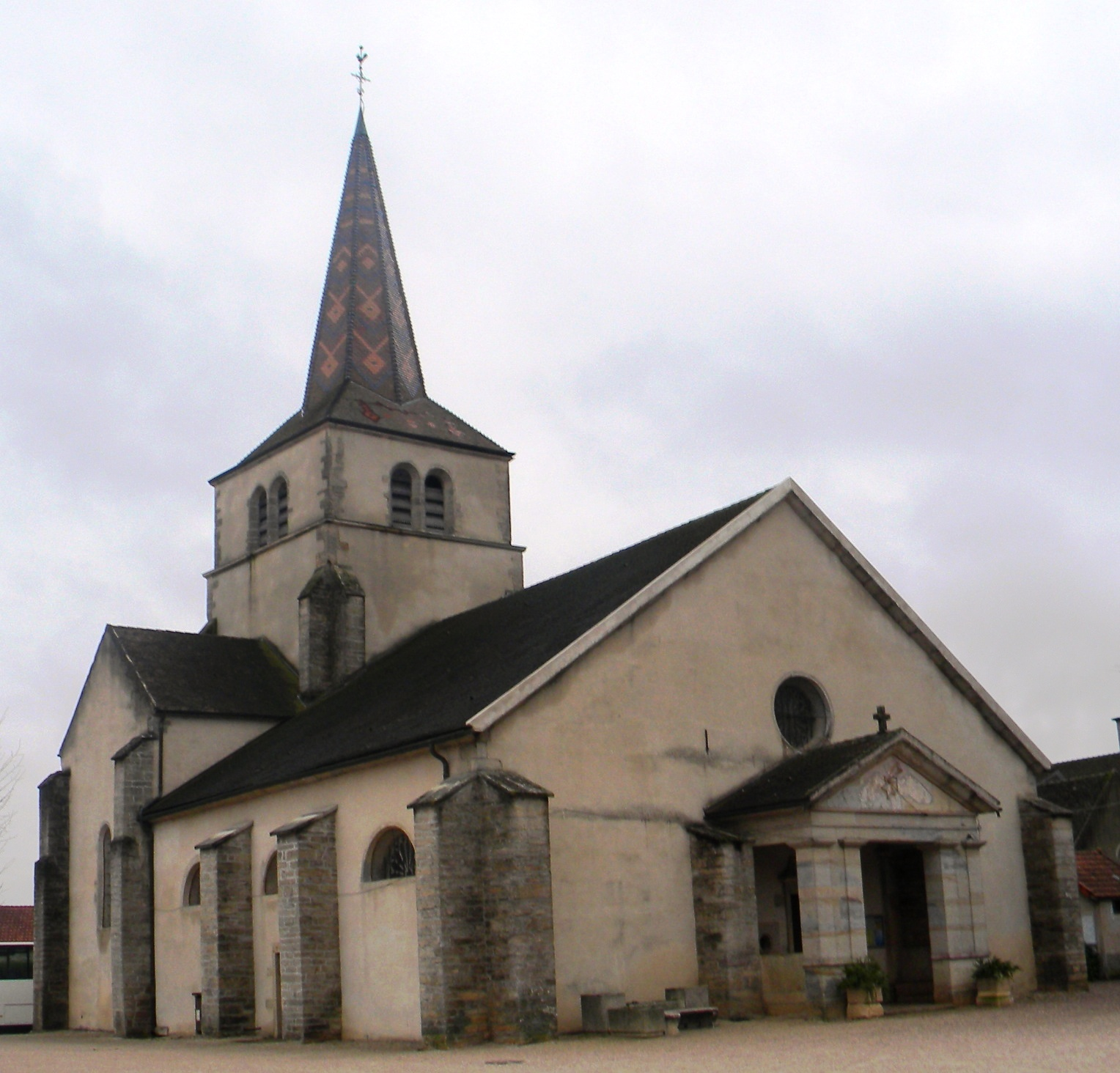
- The church in Ladoix-Serrigny

- Coat of arms
- Location of Ladoix-Serrigny
- Location within France Location within Bourgogne-Franche-Comté
- Coordinates: 47°04′01″N 4°53′15″E
- Country: France
- Region: Bourgogne-Franche-Comté
- Department: Côte-d'Or
- Arrondissement: Beaune
- Canton: Ladoix-Serrigny
- Intercommunality: CA Beaune Côte et Sud

Government
  - Mayor (2020–2026): Jérôme Fol
- Area^{1}: 24.96 km^{2} (9.64 sq mi)
- Highest elevation: 360 m (1,180 ft)
- Lowest elevation: 197 m (646 ft)
- Population (2023): 1,770
  - Density: 70.9/km^{2} (184/sq mi)
- Time zone: UTC+01:00 (CET)
  - Summer (DST): UTC+02:00 (CEST)
- INSEE/Postal code: 21606 /21550
- ^{1} French Land Register data, which excludes lakes, ponds, glaciers > 1 km^{2} (0.386 sq mi or 247 acres) and river estuaries.

Ladoix-Serrigny (French pronunciation: [ladwa sɛʁiɲi], before 1988: Serrigny) is a commune in the Côte-d'Or department in eastern France.

== History ==
The Landelinus buckle was uncovered in a vineyard at Ladoix-Serrigny in 1971.

== Population ==
Historical population
Year	Pop.	±% p.a.
1968	1,106	—
1975	1,139	+0.42%
1982	1,311	+2.03%
1990	1,549	+2.11%
1999	1,618	+0.49%
2007	1,706	+0.66%
2012	1,852	+1.66%
2017	1,834	−0.20%
2023	1,770	−0.59%
Source: INSEE

== Wine ==
Ladoix-Serrigny is one of the wine communes of the Côte de Beaune, and the wines are usually labelled Ladoix, without the Serrigny part. The northeastern part of the Corton hill is in the commune, including some vineyards used to produce the Grand Cru wines Corton and Corton-Charlemagne. Some of the Premier Cru vineyards in Ladoix-Serrigny are part of the appellation of the neighboring village, and sold as Aloxe-Corton Premier Cru.

== See also ==
- Communes of the Côte-d'Or department
