= Volnay wine =

French wine

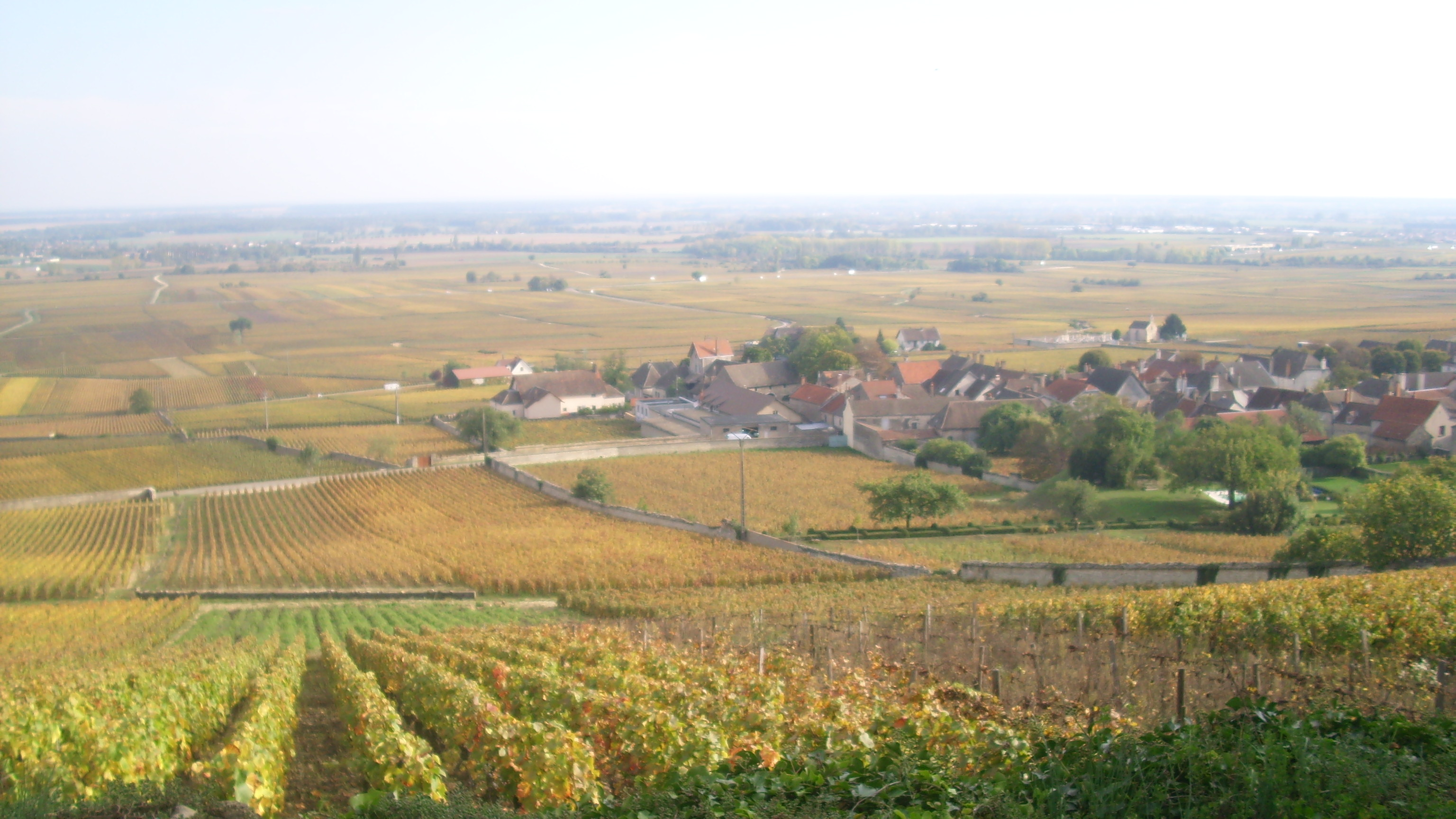
Vineyards around Volnay. Most of the vineyards in the image, those to the left of the village and immediately beyond it, are classified Premier Cru. In the far distance are some village-level vineyards.

Volnay wine is produced in the commune of Volnay in Côte de Beaune of Burgundy, and in some vineyards in the commune of Meursault. The Appellation d'origine contrôlée (AOC) Volnay is only used for red wine with pinot noir as the main grape variety. There are no Grand Cru vineyards within Volnay, but several highly regarded Premier Cru vineyards. The AOC was created in 1937 (88 years ago).

In 2008, there were 206.7 hectares (511 acres) of vineyard surface was in production for Volnay wine at village and Premier Cru level, and 7,733 hectoliter of wine was produced, corresponding to just over 1 million bottles.

The AOC regulations also allow up to 15% total of chardonnay, pinot blanc and pinot gris as accessory grapes in the red wines, but this not very often practiced. The allowed base yield is 40 hectoliter per hectare. The grapes must reach a maturity of at least 10.5% potential alcohol for village-level wine, and 11.0% for Premier Cru wine.

The style of Volnay wine is typically light and aromatic, and elegant rather than powerful, with considerably less tannin than the Pommard wines from the neighboring village.

== Premiers Crus ==
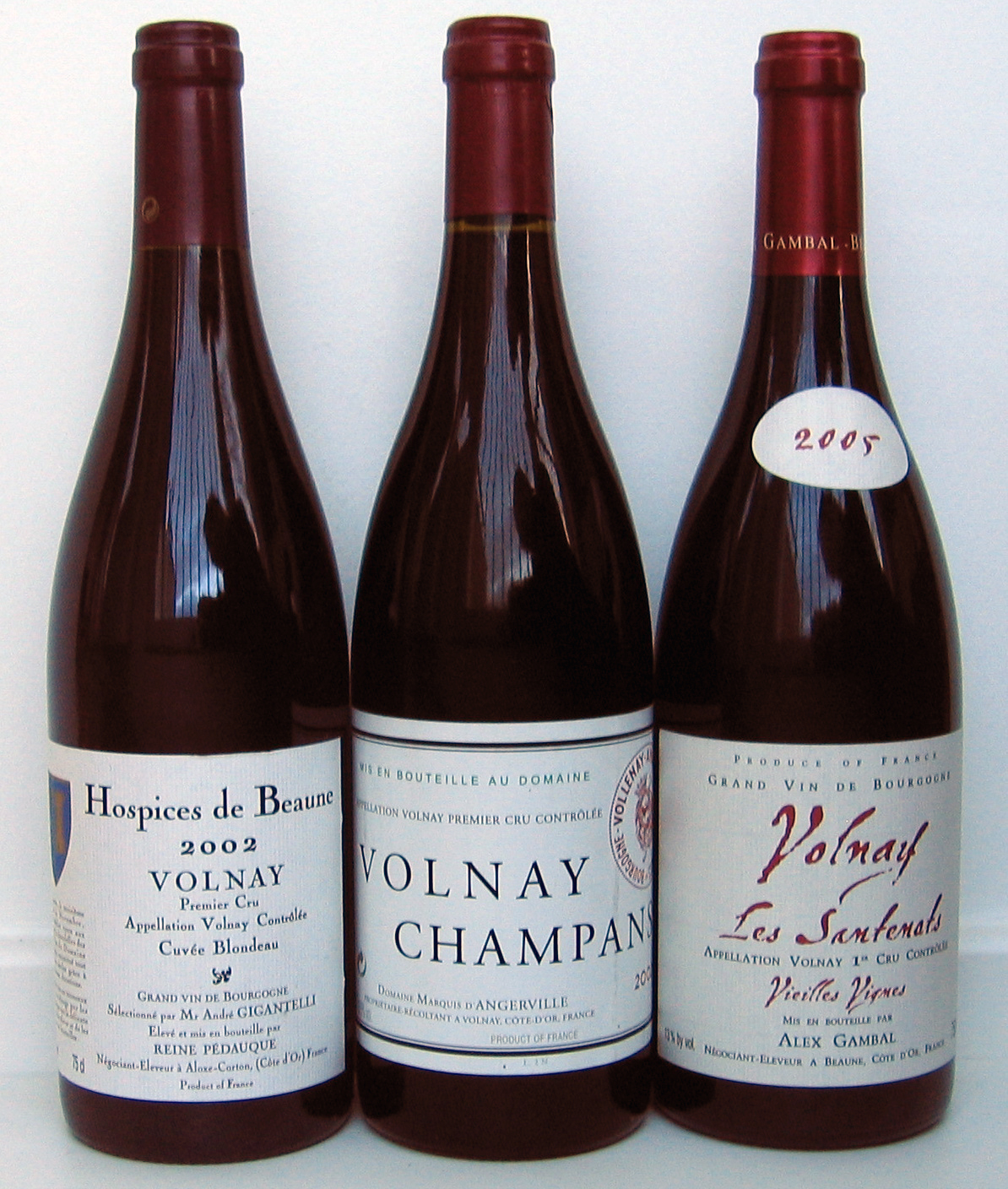
Three bottles of Volnay Premier Cru. The left-hand bottle is a named cuvée which does not mention a specific vineyard, the bottle in the middle is from the Champans vineyard, and the right-hand bottle is from Volnay-Santenots, a vineyard in the commune of Meursault.

There are 29 climats within the Volnay AOC that are classified as Premier Cru vineyards, which stretch in a wide band through the commune, located mid-slope and on both sides of the D973 road. Their wines are designated Volnay Premier Cru + vineyard name, or may be labelled just Volnay Premier Cru, in which case it is possible to blend wine from several Premier Cru vineyards within the AOC.

In 2007, 132.68 hectares (327.9 acres) of the total Volnay vineyard surface consisted of Premier Cru vineyards. The annual production of Premier Cru wine, as a five-year average, is 4,756 hectoliter.

The climats classified as Premiers Crus, and located within Volnay, are:

- Pitures-Dessus
- Lassolle
- Clos des Ducs
- Le Village
- Clos de la Cave des Ducs
- Clos de l’Audignac
- Clos de la Chapelle
- Clos du Château des Ducs
- Clos de la Rougeotte
- Frémiets-Clos de la Rougeotte
- Clos de la Barre
- Clos de la Bousse d’Or
- Les Brouillards
- Mitans
- Les Angles
- Frémiets
- La Gigotte
- Les Lurets
- Robardelle
- Les Grand Champs
- Carelle sous la Chapelle
- Le Ronceret
- Champans
- Les Caillerets
- Les Caillerets-Clos des 60 Ouvrées
- En Chevret
- Taille Pieds
- Clos du Verseuil
- Clos des Chênes

=== Volnay-Santenots ===
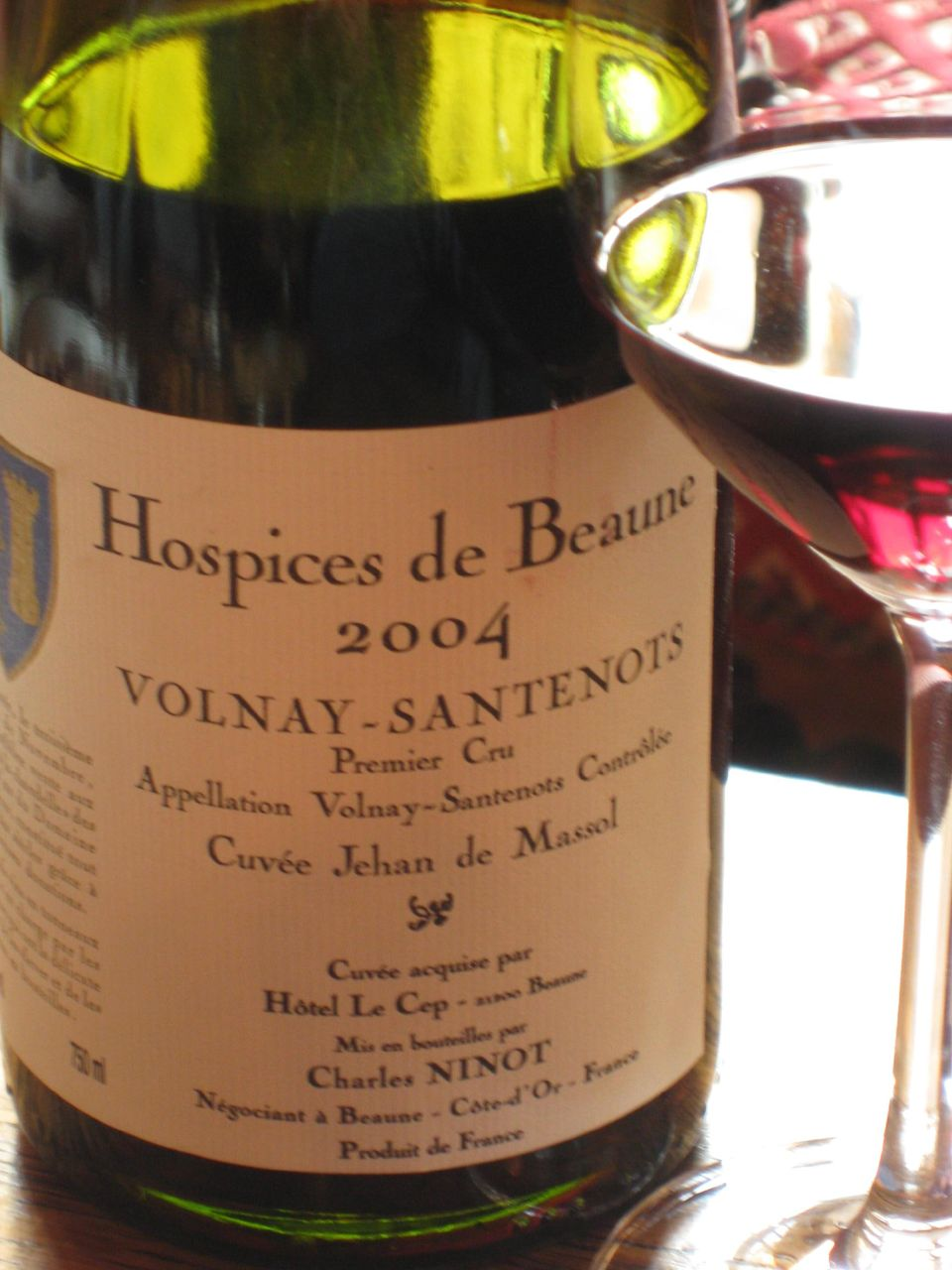
A bottle of Volnay-Santenots from the Hospices de Beaune.

Five climats in the north of Meursault, just across the border from the commune of Volnay, together make up Santenots, which also fall within the Volnay AOC and therefore can use the designation Volnay-Santenots for red wine. All are classified as Premier Cru. While it is allowed to produce both white and red Meursault wine, white wine production dominates, and Volnay is more famous than Meursault for red wine, so from a marketing point of view, the designation Volnay-Santenots is logical to use for the red wines. The "Santenots" part is not mandatory; wines from these vineyards may simply be called Volnay or Volnay Premier Cru.
