= Corton (wine) =

Type of Burgundy wine

Coordinates: 47°04′23″N 4°52′01″E

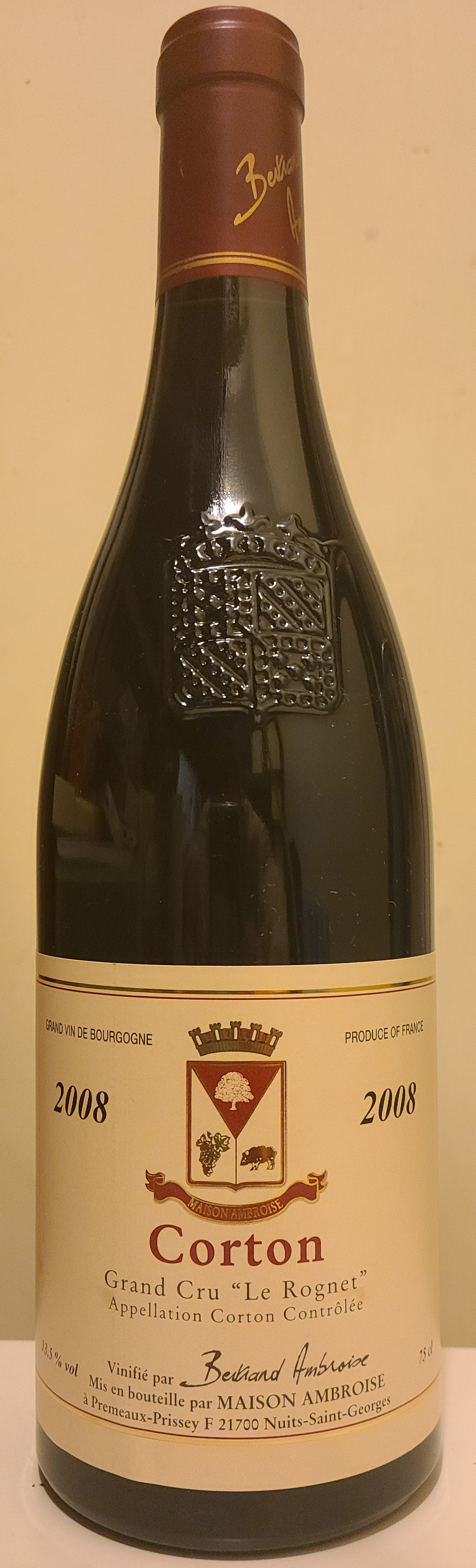
2008 Maison Bertrand Ambroise Corton-Le Rognet

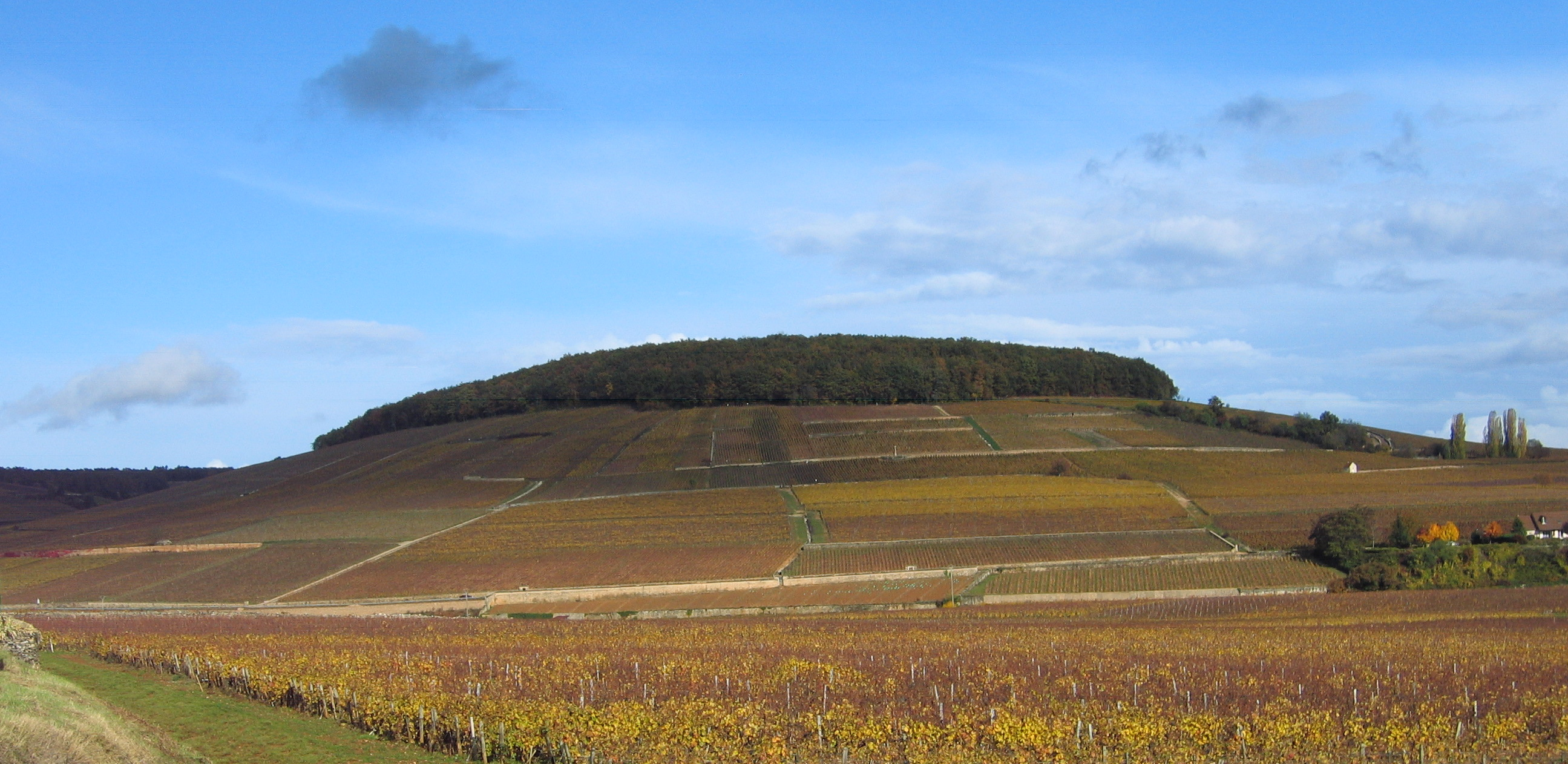
The Corton hill as seen from southwest. The Corton vineyards on this side of the hill are located in Aloxe-Corton.

Corton is an Appellation d'origine contrôlée (AOC) and Grand Cru vineyard for red and white wine in the Côte de Beaune subregion of Burgundy. It is located on a hill shared between the three villages of Aloxe-Corton, Pernand-Vergelesses and Ladoix in the Côte de Beaune, Burgundy. The appellation covers the lower parts of the Corton hill and includes several subordinate vineyard names, or climats, within the AOC. Because of the size of the AOC and the variability of these climats, it is the rule rather than the exception that the name of the climat is indicated together with that of the Corton AOC, leading to designations such as Corton Clos du Roi and Corton Les Bressandes. Corton is rare in this aspect, as the 'climat' is seldom used for other Grand Cru appellations in Côte d'Or. The AOC was created in 1937.

Corton wines are mostly red (around 95 per cent of the total production in the AOC) and made from the Pinot noir grape, however a smaller quantity of white Corton from Chardonnay is also produced. Around 500,000 bottles a year are produced from the vines.

The Corton appellation itself is the Côte de Beaune's only Grand Cru appellation for red wine, and is the largest Grand Cru of Burgundy.

== Production ==
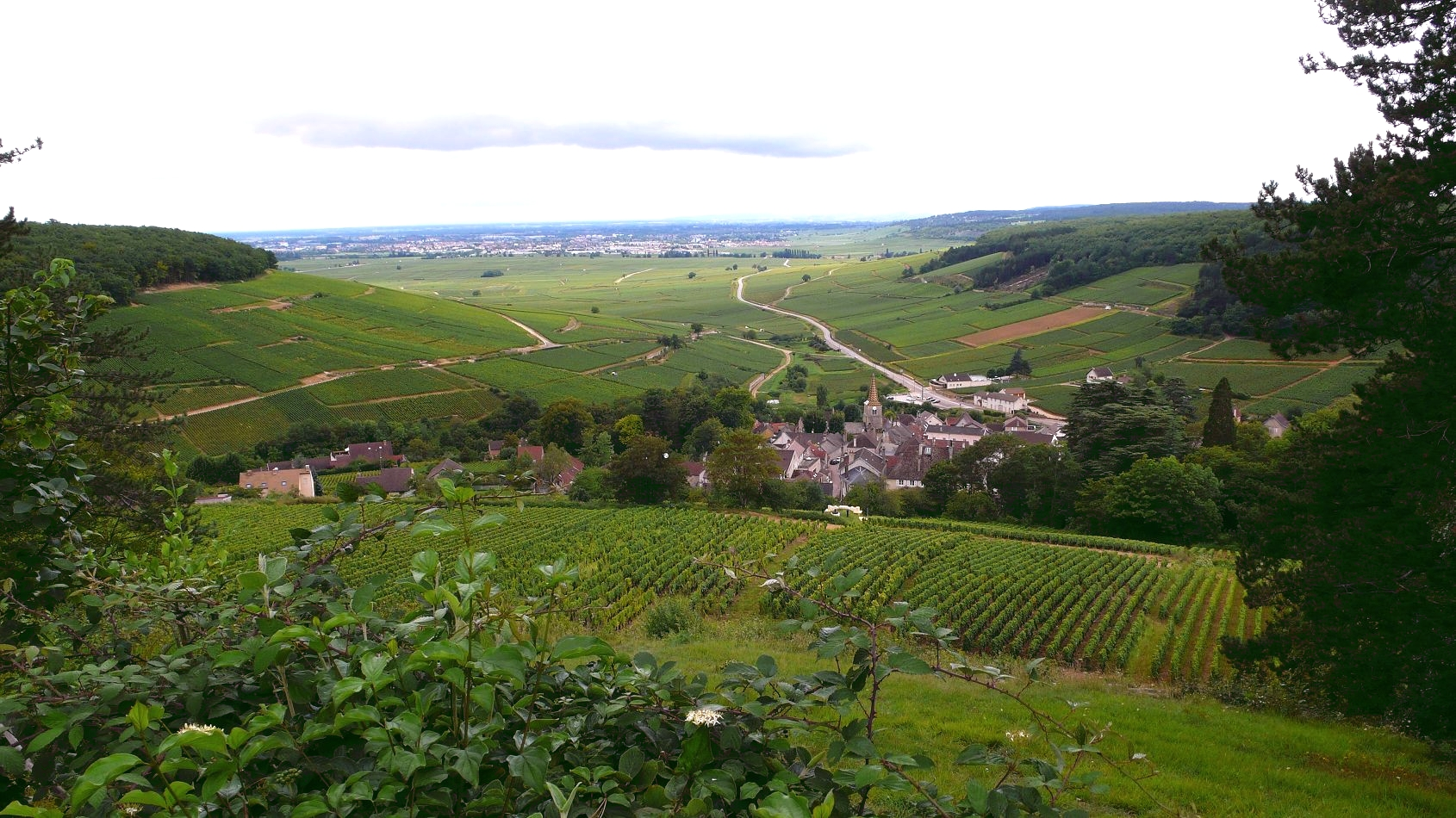
A view over Pernand-Vergelesses and surrounding vineyards, with the Corton hill on the left side.

In 2008, 94.78 hectares (234.2 acres) of vineyard surface was in production within the AOC, and 2,984 hectoliter of wine was produced, of which 2,822 hectoliter red and 162 hectoliter white. This corresponds to just under 400,000 bottles, of which just over 21,000 were white Corton.

== Producers ==
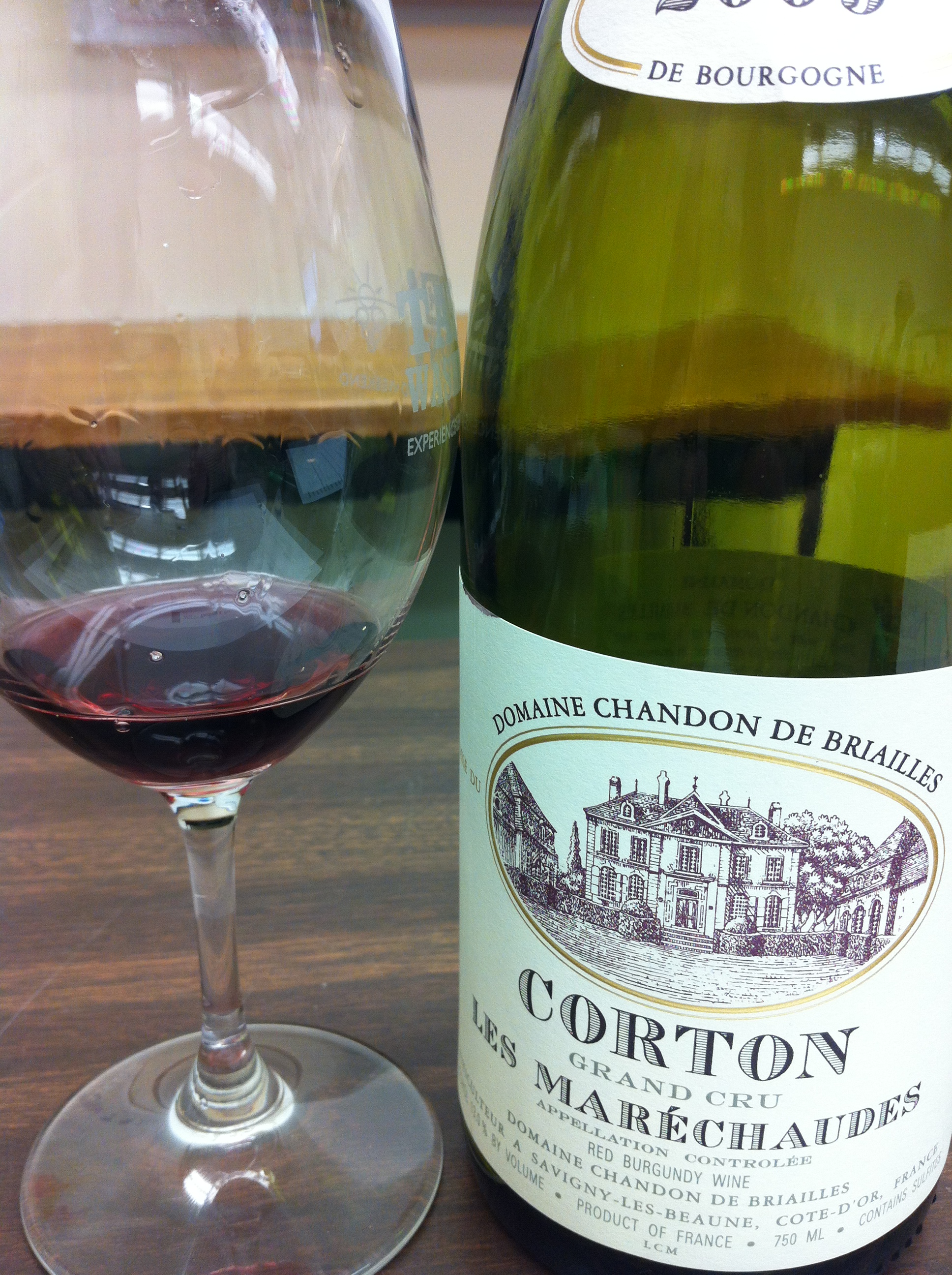
Corton wine from the Les Maréchaudes climat.

As with most Burgundy vineyards, several different producers own parts of the vineyard and produce and sell their own finished wines, or sell their grapes or wines to négociant-éleveurs for vinification or bottling and distribution.

== Corton, Corton-Charlemagne and Charlemagne ==
There are three partially overlapping Grand Cru AOCs that cover the vineyards on the Corton hill; Corton for red and white wine, Corton-Charlemagne for white wine, and the little used Charlemagne for white wine. Corton-Charlemagne from Chardonnay grapes mostly originate from the higher parts of the hill. The vineyard surface of these three appellations totalled 147.5 hectares (364 acres) in 2008. Many vineyard parcels on the hill are allowed to be used either for red Corton or white Corton-Charlemagne.

== Climats ==
Climats within the Corton AOC and permitted on bottlings include:

In Aloxe-Corton:

- Les Pougets
- Les Languettes
- Le Corton
- Les Renardes
- Les Grèves
- Le Clos du Roi
- Les Chaumes
- Les Chaumes et la Voierosse
- Les Perrières
- Les Bressandes
- Les Paulands
- Les Maréchaudes
- Les Fiètres
- Le Meix Lallemand
- Clos des Meix
- Les Combes
- La Vigne au Saint

In Ladoix-Serrigny:

- Le Rognet et Corton
- Clos des Cortons Faiveley
- Les Moutottes
- Les Carrières
- Basses Mourottes
- Hautes Mourottes
- Les Vergennes
- Les Grandes Lolières
- La Toppe au Vert

In Pernand-Vergelesses:

- Île des Vergelesses
- Les Basses Vergelesses
- Les Fichots
- Creux de la Net
- En Caradeux
- Les Plantes des Champs et Combottes
- Sous Les Clos Berthet

== See also ==
- French wine
- List of Burgundy Grand Crus
