= Pernand-Vergelesses =

- Commune
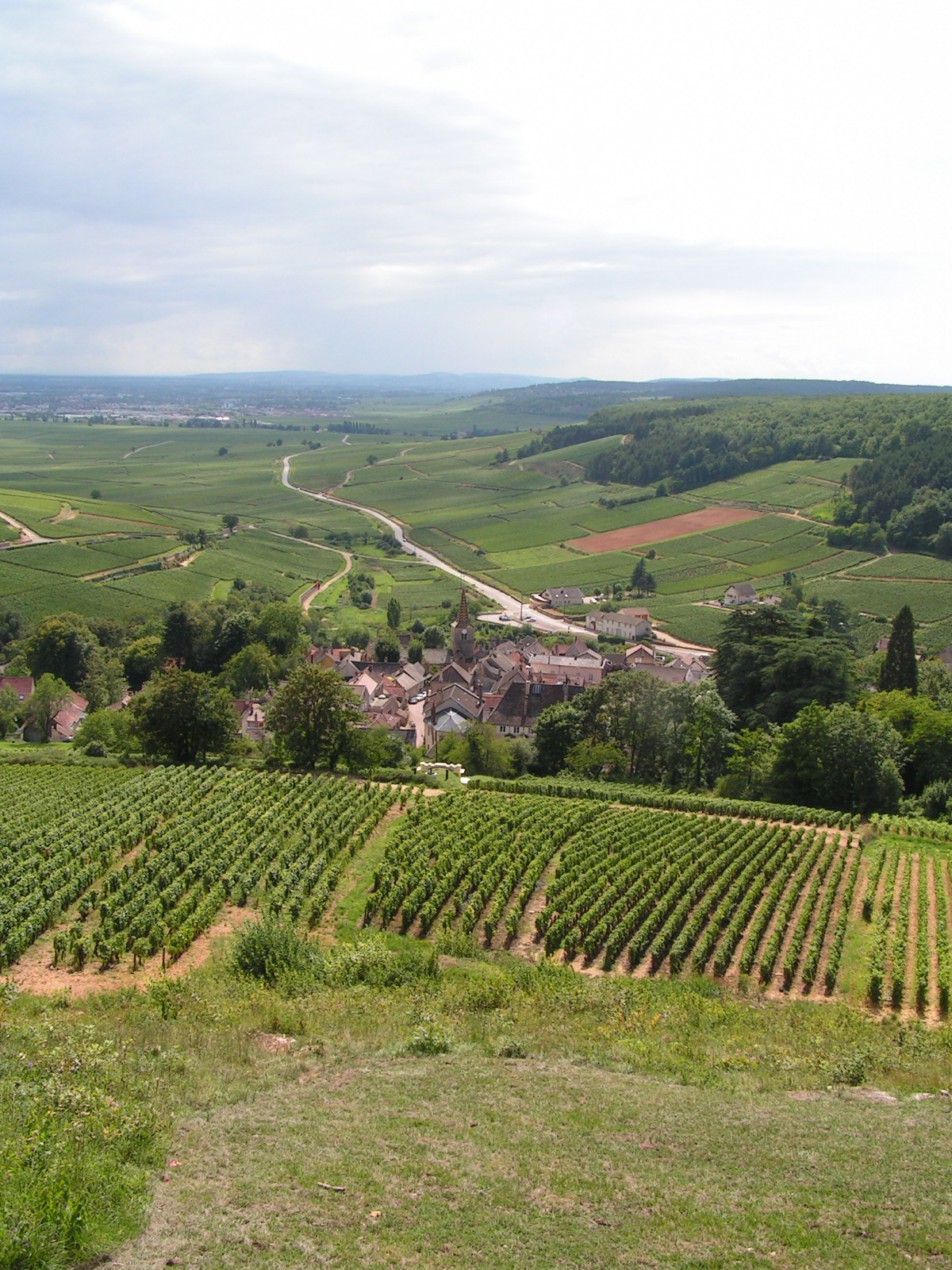
- The vineyards on the Côte de Beaune, overlooking the village

- Coat of arms
- Location of Pernand-Vergelesses
- Location within France Location within Bourgogne-Franche-Comté
- Coordinates: 47°04′51″N 4°51′06″E
- Country: France
- Region: Bourgogne-Franche-Comté
- Department: Côte-d'Or
- Arrondissement: Beaune
- Canton: Ladoix-Serrigny
- Intercommunality: CA Beaune Côte et Sud

Government
  - Mayor (2020–2026): Gilles Arpaillanges
- Area^{1}: 5.59 km^{2} (2.16 sq mi)
- Highest elevation: 435 m (1,427 ft)
- Lowest elevation: 238 m (781 ft)
- Population (2023): 237
  - Density: 42.4/km^{2} (110/sq mi)
- Time zone: UTC+01:00 (CET)
  - Summer (DST): UTC+02:00 (CEST)
- INSEE/Postal code: 21480 /21420
- ^{1} French Land Register data, which excludes lakes, ponds, glaciers > 1 km^{2} (0.386 sq mi or 247 acres) and river estuaries.

Pernand-Vergelesses (French pronunciation: [pɛʁnɑ̃ vɛʁʒəlɛs]) is a commune in the Côte-d'Or department in eastern France.

== Population ==
Historical population
Year	Pop.	±% p.a.
1968	253	—
1975	289	+1.92%
1982	334	+2.09%
1990	320	−0.53%
1999	310	−0.35%
2007	276	−1.44%
2012	261	−1.11%
2017	244	−1.34%
2023	237	−0.48%
Source: INSEE

== Wine ==
Pernand-Vergelesses is one of the wine communes of the Côte de Beaune. The western side of the Corton hill is in the commune, including vineyards used to produce the Grand Cru wine Corton-Charlemagne.

== See also ==
- Communes of the Côte-d'Or department
