= Maison Louis Latour =

Merchant and owner of red and white wines in Burgundy, France

Coordinates: 47°01′27″N 4°50′24″E

Maison Louis Latour (Château Corton Grancey)
- Industry: Wine
- Founded: 1797
- Founder: Latour Family
- Headquarters: Beaune & Aloxe-Corton, France
- Key people: Louis-Fabrice Latour
- Products: Château Corton Grancey, Chambertin "Cuvée Héritiers Latour", Corton "Clos de la Vigne au Saint", Romanée-Saint-Vivant "Les Quatre Journaux"
- Revenue: 59,460,406€ in 2021
- Subsidiaries: Louis Latour Inc, Louis Latour Agencies, Simmonet-Febvre.
- Website: www.louislatour.com

Maison Louis Latour is a merchant and owner of red and white wines in Burgundy, France. It has remained independent and family-owned since 1797. Maison Louis Latour has the largest holding of Grand Cru vineyards in the Côte d'Or with a total of 28.63 hectares (70.7 acres).

== History ==
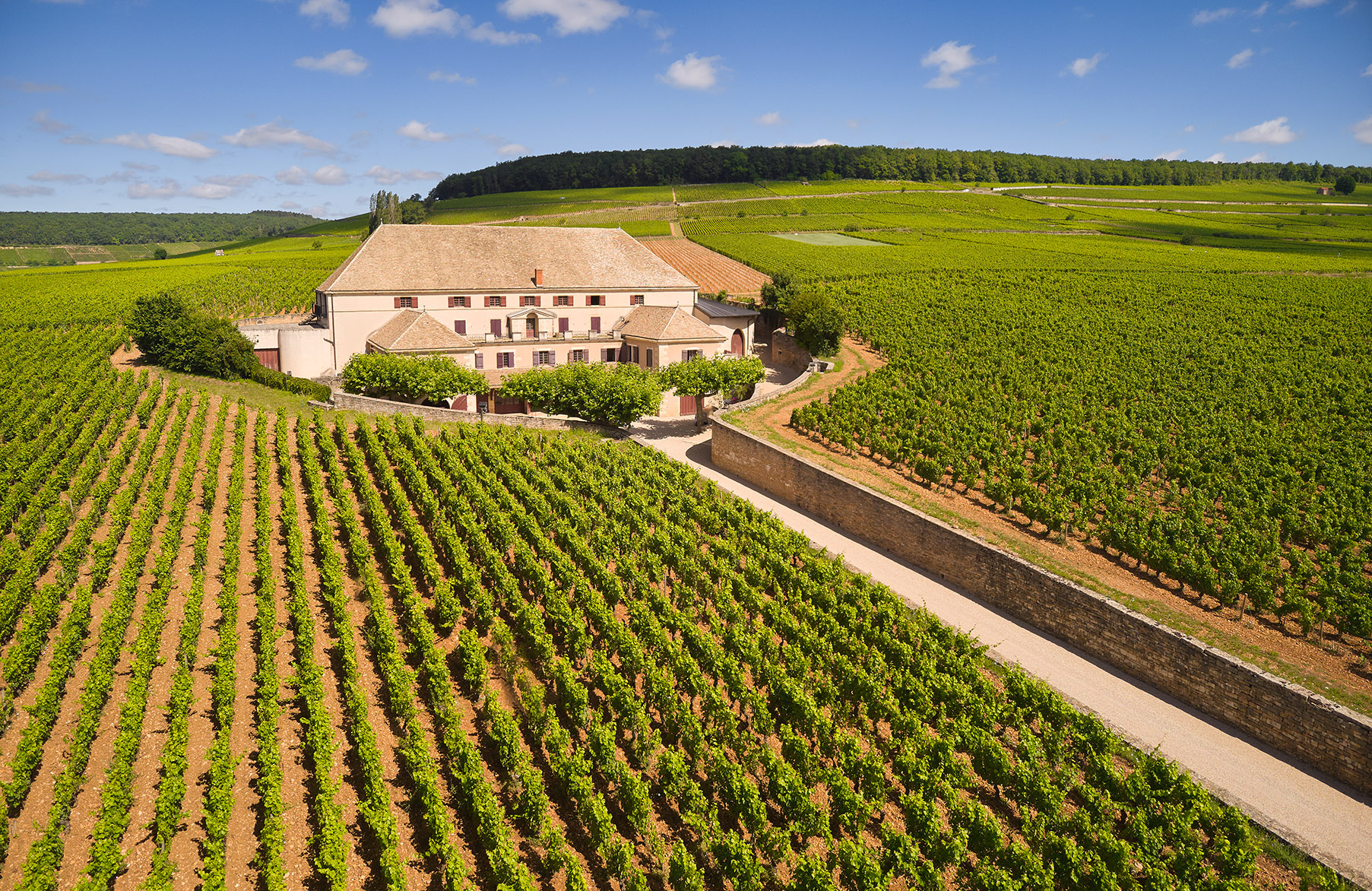
Cuverie Corton Grancey, Louis Latour, Aloxe-Corton

Founded in 1797, the Latour family have been wine-growers since the 17th century, slowly building up a unique Domaine of 50 hectares (120 acres). Latour has 33 hectares (82 acres) of vineyards in Aloxe-Corton, where the family owns Château Corton Grancey and the winery Corton Grancey. The winery Corton Grancey was built in 1834 and was the first purpose-built winery in France. In 1997 Louis Latour was admitted into the exclusive club of the Hénokiens. This club only admits companies that remain family owned, have a history of 200 years' experience and still bear the name of the founder.

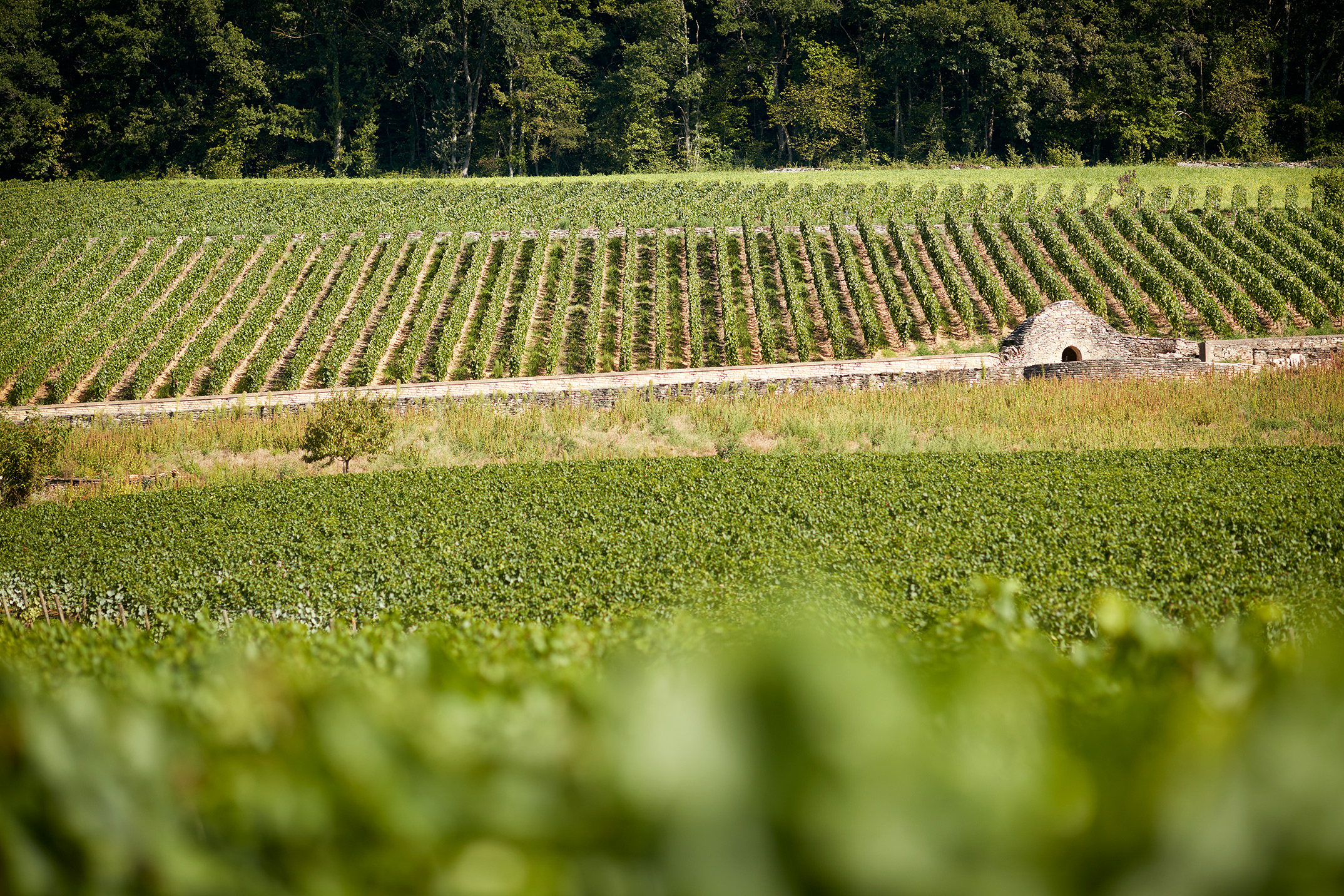
Vineyards on the hill of Corton, Aloxe-Corton

== Burgundy ==
=== Vineyards ===
The majority of Louis Latour's vineyards are in Aloxe-Corton, the original home of the family. Here, Latour owns 10.5 hectares (26 acres) of Corton-Charlemagne Grand Cru, one of the most famous white wines of Burgundy, as well as many hectares of Corton Grand Cru reds such as:

- Corton "Clos de la Vigne au Saint"
- Corton "Bressandes"
- Corton "Les Chaumes"
- Corton "Les Pougets"
- Corton "Les Perrières"
- Corton "Clos du Roi"
- Corton "Les Grèves"

The Domaine also owns Grand Crus in Chambertin "Cuvée Héritiers Latour", in Romanée-Saint-Vivant "Les Quatre Journaux" and in Chevalier-Montrachet "Les Demoiselles", as well as Premier Crus in Beaune "Aux Cras" and "Vignes Franches", in Pernand-Vergelesses "En Caradeux" and in Pommard "Epenots".

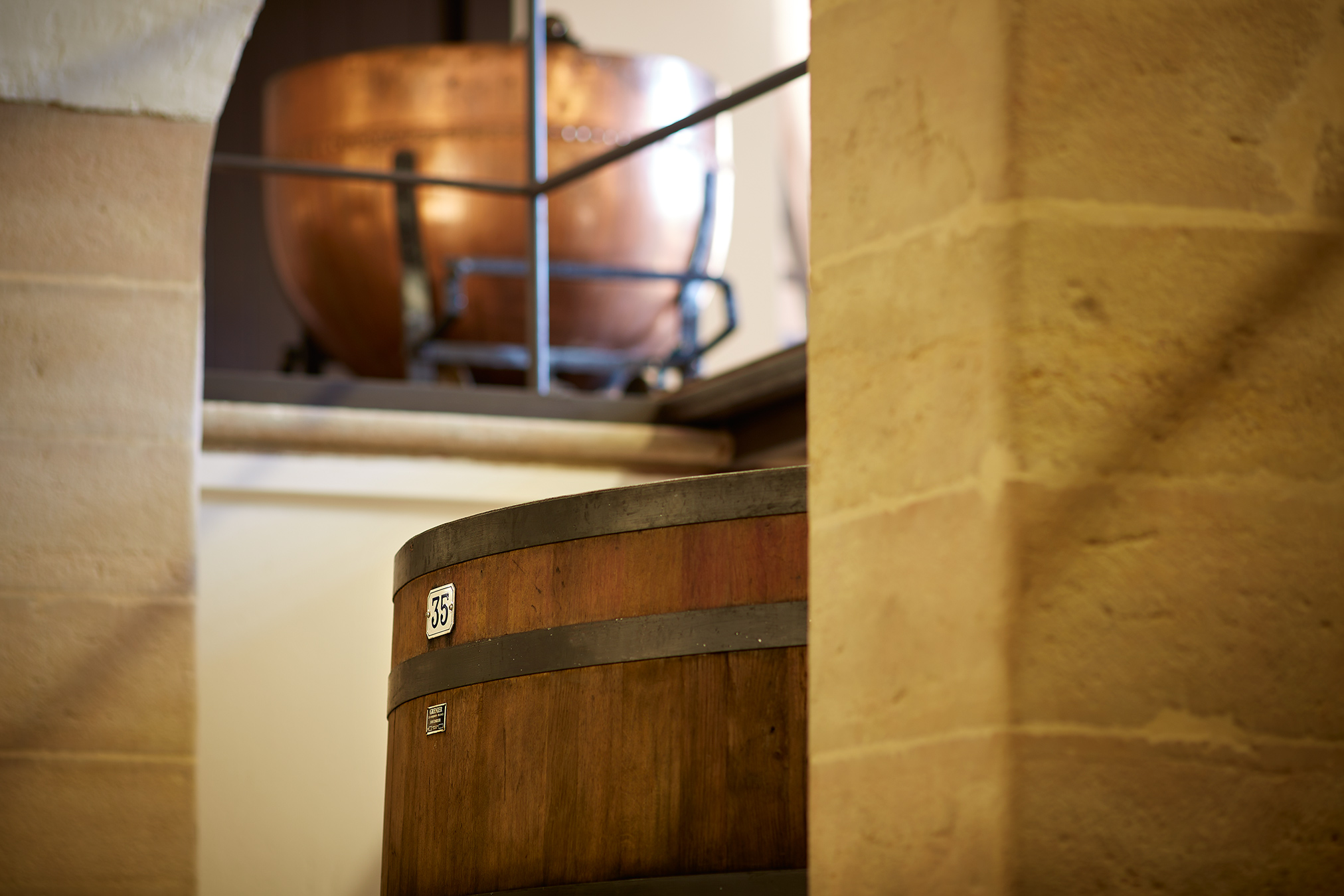
Oak vats at the Corton Grancey winery, Louis Latour

Wines are made based on climate and terroir every year and Latour is very careful with the way in which they handle the winemaking. Louis Latour strives to embed the conditions of the terroir into their wine while respecting nature and tradition, which are the quintessence of Burgundy wine.

=== Vinification ===
Harvesting is usually carried out in mid-September - depending on the maturity and health of the grapes. At Maison Louis Latour the winemakers believe that 80% of the finished wine's quality is a result of work done in the vineyards. All of the red grapes are picked manually and harvested as late as possible.

The red wines of Maison Louis Latour are still vinified and aged at the historical Corton Grancey winery, where a system of elevators and traditional rails of chariots allow the transport and winemaking process to be carried out by gravity. Maison Louis Latour respects Burgundian traditions for the vinification of its red wines from the harvest to the final product. Only the finest grapes are selected and placed into traditional French oak vats for a short period of fermentation. Once fermentation is complete, the wine is drained from the vats. This is called free-run wine. All grape skins and pips are then removed manually and pressed gently by pneumatic pressing machines. The pressed wine is then blended with the free-run wine and spends approximately 12 months in French oak barrels. It undergoes three rackings to clear it of any deposits that may have collected. After bottling, the wine is allowed to settle for a further few months before distribution.

White wine vinification differs from the reds, in that the harvested grapes go directly into the press. The pressed grape juice, called must, then undergoes a rapid fermentation in stainless steel tanks. The wine is transferred into French oak barrels where it continues to age for a period of approximately 12 months. The wine undergoes rackings before the final blending.

== Cooperage ==
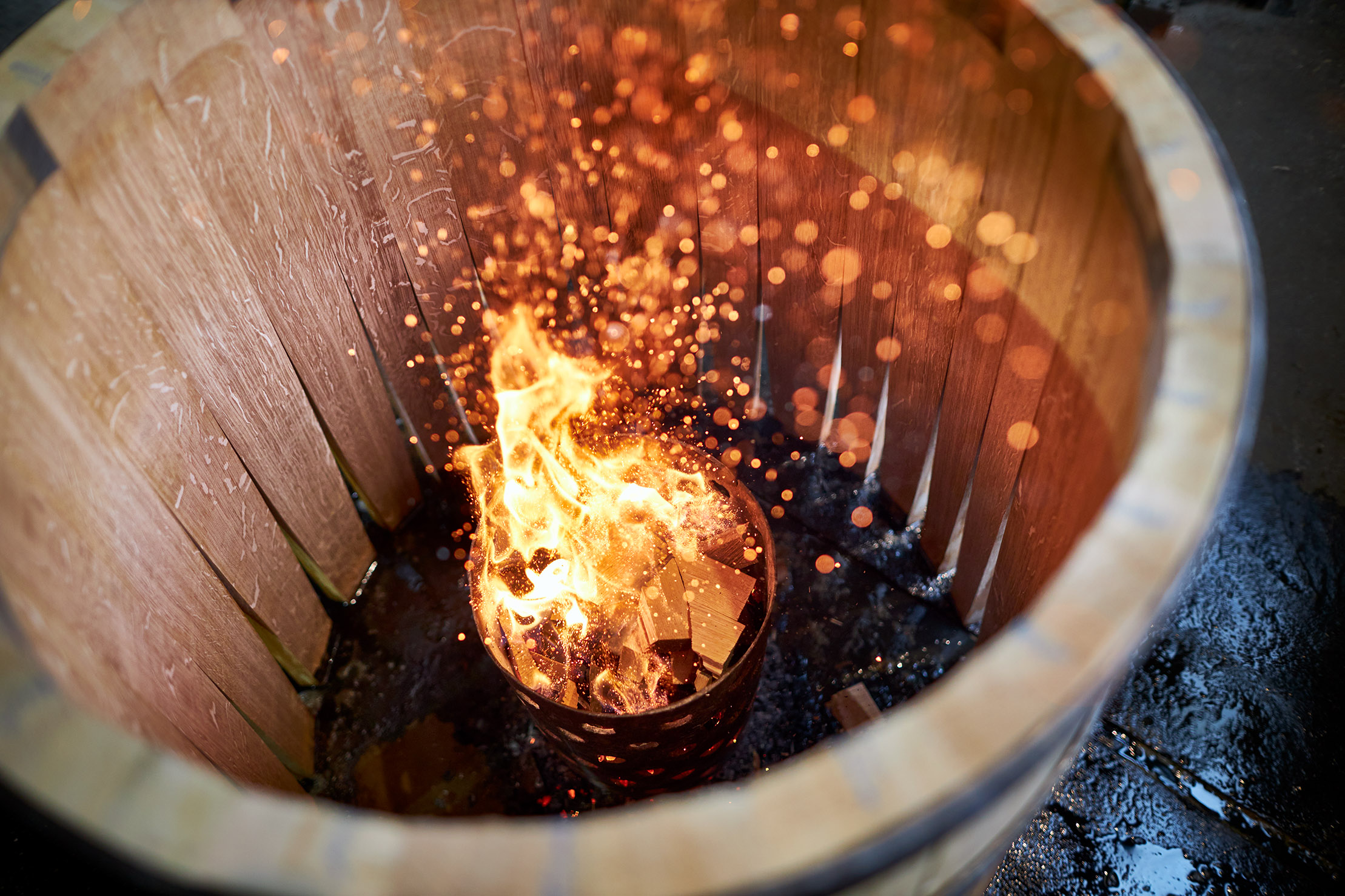
Barrel crafting, Louis Latour Cooperage

As an historical activity, Maison Louis Latour's own onsite cooperage produces approximately 3,500 oak barrels a year; half of which are used to mature their own wines, while the other half are exported worldwide for use in other wineries for Pinot Noir and Chardonnay. The oak is sourced from the forests of Northern and Central France, where it is aged in the open air for more than two years. The master coopers shape the wood by hand, using traditional techniques. The barrels are medium toasted and branded with the year of production, which allows the in-house oenologists to choose a proportion of new or already used barrels for each wine, and to form a clear idea of the exchange that will occur between the wood and the wine.

== The Grand Crus of Maison Louis Latour ==
Corton-Charlemagne

Corton-Charlemagne is a Grand Cru from the hill of Corton in the Côte de Beaune appellation. It is one of the flagship wines of Maison Louis Latour. This vineyard is close to the famous "Clos Charlemagne" which was property of the Emperor Charlemagne until 775. The word “Corton” is a contraction of “Curtis Othonis” which means “domain of Othon”, an emperor.

Paradoxically, it was the worst crisis that the Burgundian vineyards ever knew that gave birth to this wine. The limestone-rich soil at the top of the hillside had been ignored before Louis Latour – the 7th generation of Latour – decided to plant Chardonnay instead of the Aligoté that was destroyed by phylloxera. As an homage, his signature still graces the Corton-Charlemagne label today. Situated at the summit of the hill of Corton, the vineyards reach a perfect maturity thanks to their southern exposure. They are overseen by the cross of Charlemagne, a monument given by the Hospices de Beaune in 1943 to Louis-Noël Latour.

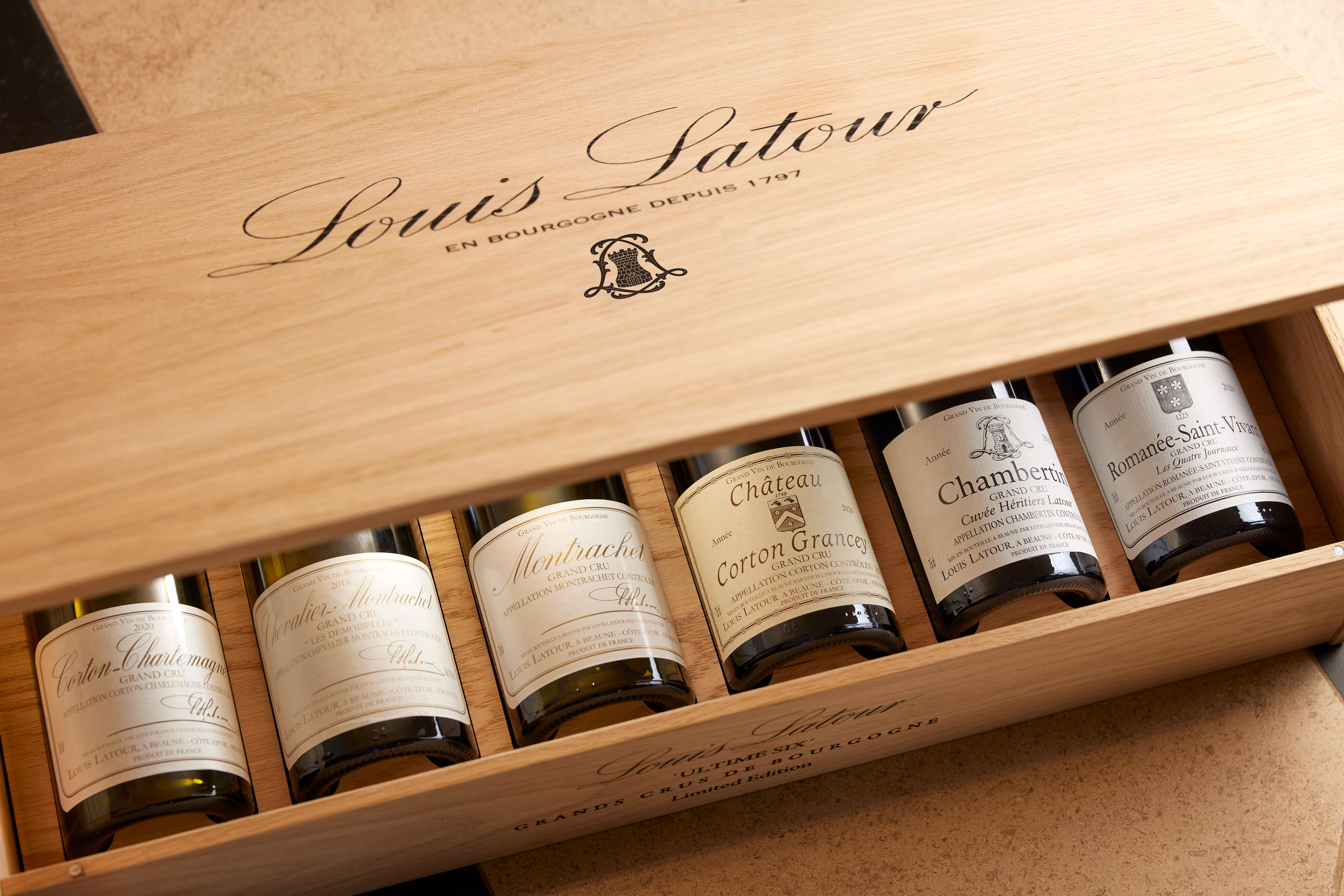
Grand Cru wine selection, Louis Latour

Château Corton Grancey

The hill of Corton is known for the quality of its soil and its exposure. The cuvée Château Corton Grancey Grand Cru, is only produced in the best years, it was created in order to honor the history of the Domaine. It is a blend of five Grand Crus of Corton: Les Bressandes, Les Perrières, Les Grèves, Les Chaumes, and Le Clos du Roi. The wines are vinified and aged separately, then the best barrels are selected to produce the cuvée.

"Grancey" was the name of the last owners of the château located on the Rue des Corton (street of Corton) before the purchase of this building by the Latour family in 1891.

Chambertin Grand Cru «Cuvée Héritiers Latour»

The Grand Cru of the Côte de Nuits, Chambertin was already cultivated in the 6th century by the monks of the Bèze Abbey.

At the end of the 19th century, the Latour family bought 0.81 hectares in the Chambertin Grand Cru appellation, constituting a single parcel, from top to bottom of the hillside, closer to Latricières-Chambertin than to Clos de Bèze. The terroir of Chambertin is due to a geological phenomenon called "cone alluvial". It is a complex terroir characterized by brown limestone soils, which gives complex and powerful wines.

Romanée-Saint-Vivant Grand Cru «Les Quatre Journaux»

The Grand Cru of the Côte de Nuits, Romanée-Saint-Vivant bears the name of the priory of Saint-Vivant. The monks were the first to cultivate vines around Vosne-Romanée.

The Latour family has owned 0.8 hectares of Romanée-Saint-Vivant since December 1898, purchased by the Domaine from the heirs of the Marey-Monge and Larey families. The parcel "Les Quatre Journaux" is located southwest of Romanée-Saint-Vivant, close to Romanée-Conti.

Chevalier Montrachet Grand Cru «Les Demoiselles»

The Chevalier-Montrachet parcel is located just above the Montrachet parcel and is an exception because its brown soils are usually reserved for Pinot Noir. However, here they produce famous Chardonnays.

In 1913, Domaine Latour bought 0.51 hectare of Chevalier-Montrachet from the widow of Léonce Bocquet, restorer of part of the Château du Clos de Vougeot. This parcel was named "Les Demoiselles" in homage to Adèle and Julie Voillot, the daughters of a Beaune General at the beginning of the 19th century, who owned the parcel and died without marrying.

== Ardèche and Var ==
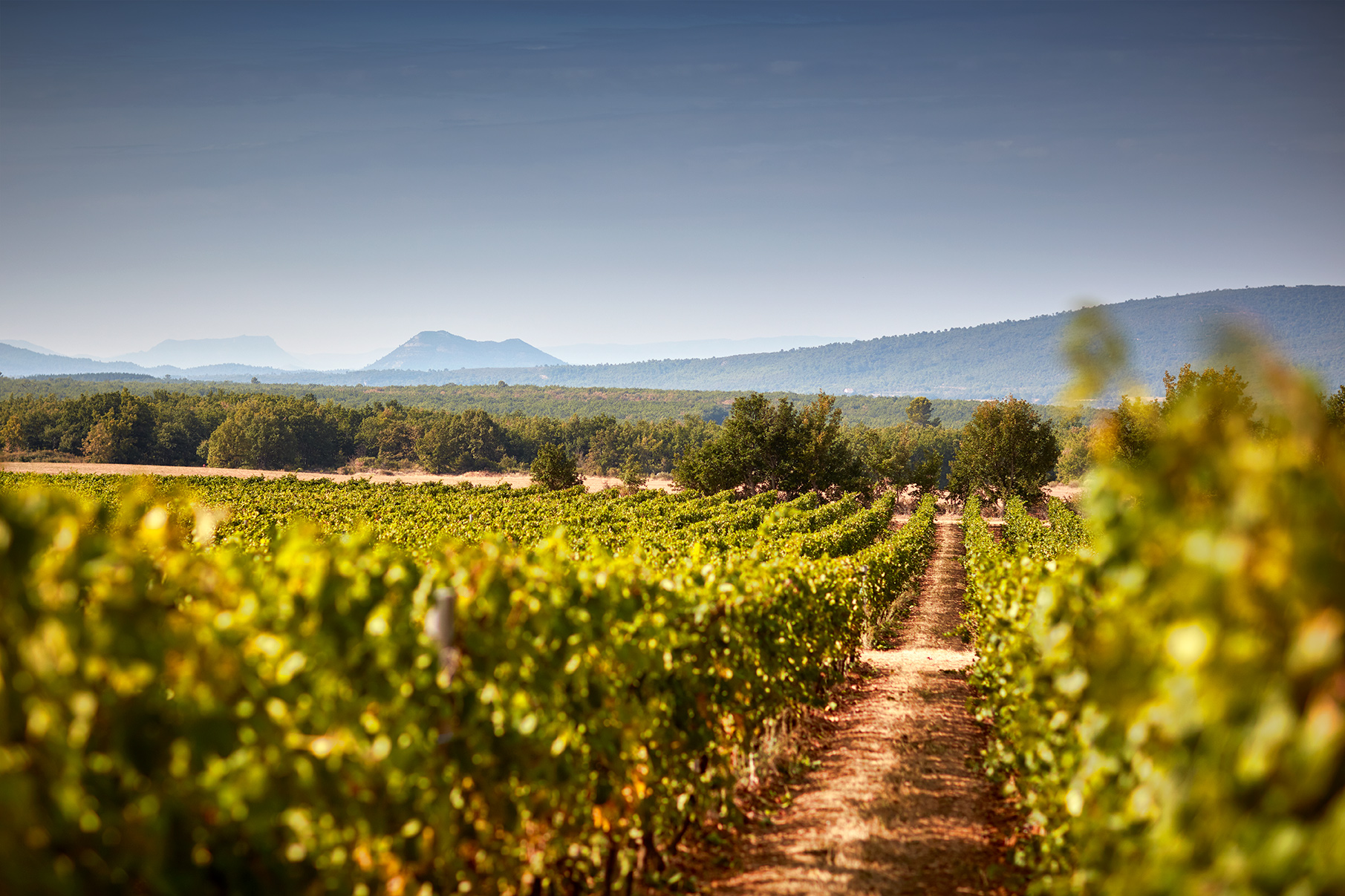
Domaine de Valmoissine, Var

In 1979 Louis Latour decided to explore the valley of the Ardèche River with its clay and limestone-based soils as the ideal location to produce top-quality Chardonnay wines. Here, Louis Latour produces Chardonnay Ardèche as well as the Grand Ardèche, which is treated as if it were grown in one of the Grand Cru vineyards of the Côte-d'Or. Only the ripest grapes are used and fermentation and aging takes place in oak barrels from the Louis Latour cooperage. Following this, the Domaine decided to create a new cuvée, "the Duet" - a blend of Chardonnay and Viognier (a historical grape variety of the Ardèche). The two grape varieties are vinified together. The Domaine also produces a Viognier wine, the grapes are harvested by hand and the wine is made in the modern winery near the village of Alba-la-Romaine.

The Domaine de Valmoissine: In 1989, Louis Latour decided to plant Pinot Noir in the Var region with the aim of producing a quality Pinot Noir at an affordable price. The Domaine de Valmoissine is located on the Coteaux du Verdon, in the south-east of France, near Aups. The vineyards are on the site of a former monastery, 500 meters above sea level, thus benefiting from a southern climate: the days are warm and sunny and the nights remain cool, which is beneficial to Pinot Noir. The grapes are fermented in open stainless steel tanks for approximately one week.
