= Louis-Fabrice Latour =

French wine producer (1964–2022)

- Born: 1964
- Died: 2022; France
- Occupation: Businessman

Louis-Fabrice Latour (February 29, 1964 – September 5, 2022) was a French wine producer.

== Biography ==
Latour was born in Beaune, Burgundy. After graduating from Sciences Po in Paris with a degree in political science in 1985, Latour worked briefly at BNP Paribas before joining his family's wine business in 1989. In 1995, he married Patricia, and in 1999 he became head of the family business, Maison Louis Latour.

During his tenure, he expanded the Maison Louis Latour's operations, obtained ISO 14001 certification in 2003, and acquired wine producer Simonnet-Febvre in Chablis the same year. Later, Maison Louis Latour acquired the Henry Fessy winery in Beaujolais (2008) and established the Pierres Dorées vineyard for Pinot Noir in Coteaux Bourguignons near Lyon. In 2022, Latour supported the restoration of the historic "Cross of Charlemagne" monument on Corton Hill.

Latour served as president of several wine trade organizations, including the Federation of Burgundy Négociants (FNEB, 2003–2014), the Federation of Wine and Spirit Exporters (FEVS, 2011–2014), and the Bureau Interprofessionnel des Vins de Bourgogne (BIVB, 2013–2021), where he co-presided with François Labet from 2015 to 2021.

In 2011, Latour was awarded the Legion of Honour. He died of cancer on September 5, 2022, at the age of 58.
