= Corton-Charlemagne =

Winery in Burgundy

Coordinates: 47°04′18″N 4°51′20″E

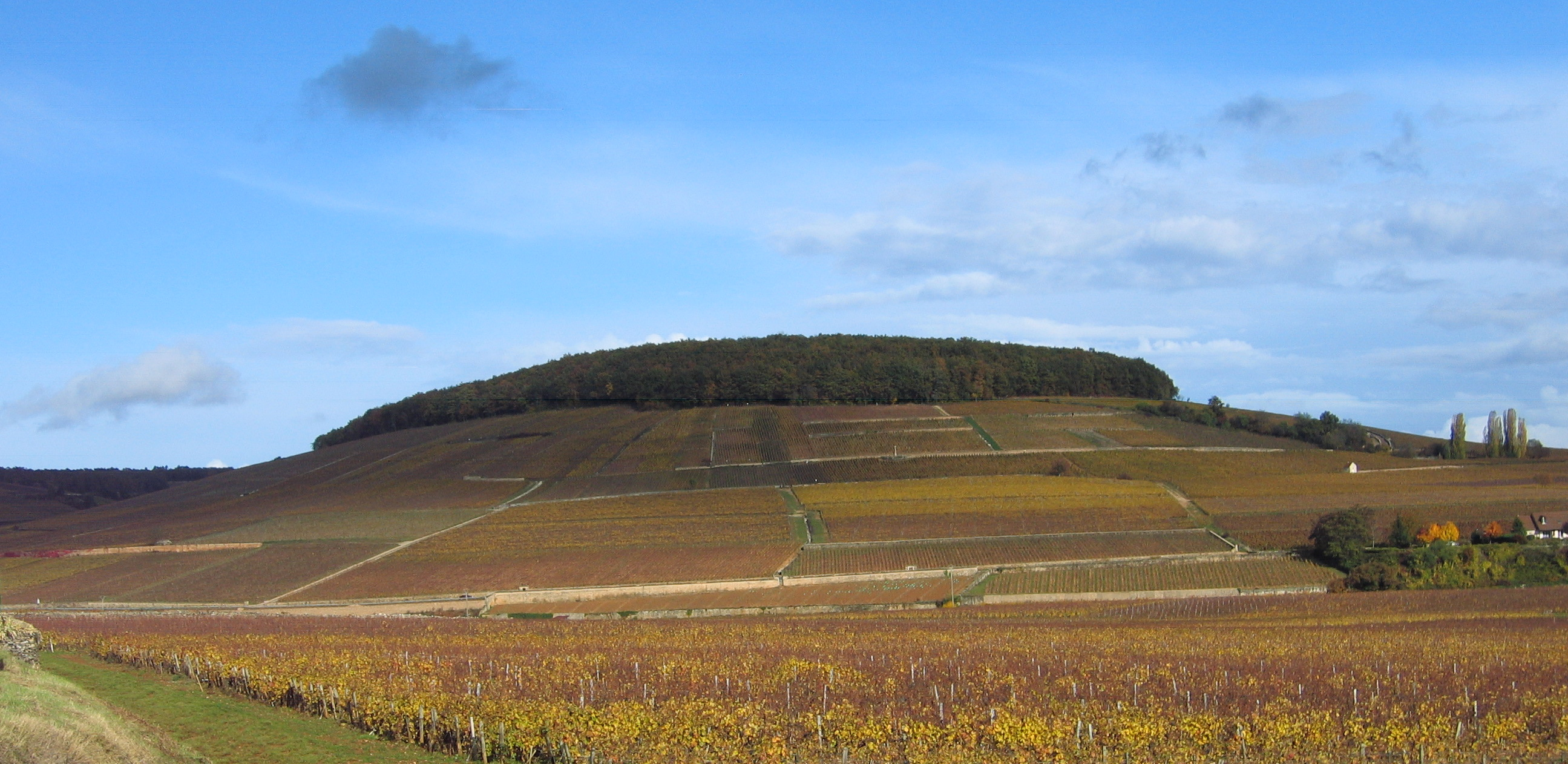
The Corton hill as seen from southwest. The Corton vineyards on this side of the hill are located in Aloxe-Corton.

Corton-Charlemagne is an Appellation d'origine contrôlée (AOC) and Grand Cru vineyard for white wine in the Côte de Beaune subregion of Burgundy. It is located in the communes of Aloxe-Corton, Pernand-Vergelesses and Ladoix-Serrigny with Chardonnay, and Pinot Blanc being the only permitted grape varieties. Around 300,000 bottles of white wine are produced each year in the appellation.

Corton-Charlemagne is named after the Holy Roman Emperor Charlemagne, who once owned the hill of Corton on which the vineyards now rest. The first mention of a Clos de Charlemagne dates to 1375, in a lease of the 'Clos le Charlemagne' by the Chapitre de Saint-Androche-de- Saulieu. According to later legend, the vineyards are dedicated to white grape varieties because the emperor's wife preferred white wines as they did not stain his beard. The AOC was created in 1937.

The vines are located on the higher ground of a hilltop that stretches between the Burgundian villages of Ladoix-Serrigny and Pernand-Vergelesses. The slopes planted with the most valuable vineyards face south-east on the hilltop, with the land gradually sloping downwards towards the major French highway Route 74. The red wine appellation of Corton covers the lower part of the hill with the areas for Corton and Corton-Charlemagne partially overlapping. Furthermore, there is a third Grand Cru appellation on the Corton hill, Charlemagne, that may be used for white wine produced from the En Charlemagne lieu-dit. However, as En Charlemagne is only 0.28 hectares in size, production is limited and usually blended with grapes from the other lieu-dits of Corton-Charlemagne.

As of 2012, the Corton-Charlemagne AOC was producing an average of 2,280 hectoliters of wine a year (around 304,000 bottles of wine) representing more than 2 out of every 3 bottles of all the Grand Cru class white wine produced throughout the Côte de Nuits and Côte de Beaune. Bonneau du Martray is the largest single owner of vines within the Corton-Charlemagne vineyard with 9.5 hectares.

== History and name ==
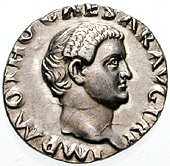
The name of the Roman Emperor Otho was eventually corrupted into "Corton".

The hill of Corton that contains the Corton-Charlemagne AOC is located behind (north/northwest) the commune of Aloxe-Corton. The commune itself has had a long history dating to its time as a 3rd-century AD Roman outpost on the road from Marseille to Autun. It was known then as Aulociacum but over the centuries the name eventually evolved into Alossia, Alussa, Alouxe and then, by the turn of the 17th century, it was known as Aloxe. In 1862, the name "Corton" was appended to the name in reference to the notable Le Corton vineyards that already had wide recognition. The name Corton was a corruption of Curtis d'Orthon meaning Domaine of Otho in reference to the first-century Roman emperor.

Vineyards were recorded on the hill by 696 AD though it is very likely that they were planted much earlier. In the late 8th century AD, the land was owned by Charlemagne: in 775 he gave most of the hill of Corton to the Abbey of St. Andoche in Saulieu, which had been destroyed by Saracens in 731.

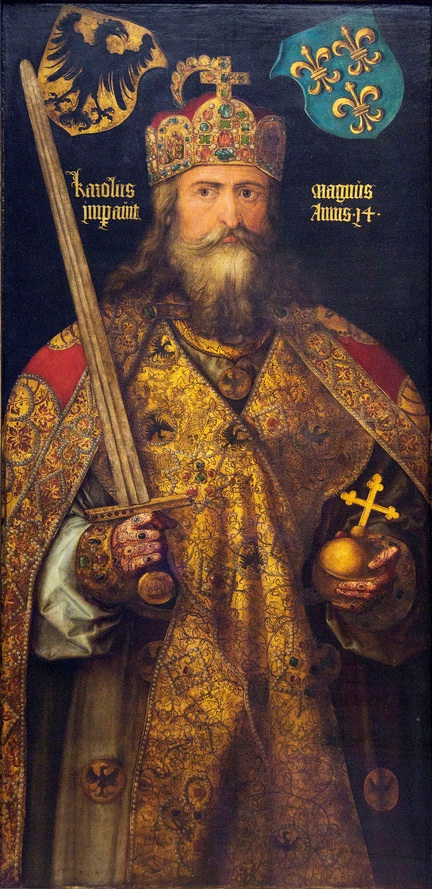
Holy Roman Emperor Charlemagne who, as King of the Franks, gave the hill of Corton to the abbey of St. Andoche

According to legend, Charlemagne noted to the Abbey sections of the slope where the snow melted first and ordered that grapevines be planted on that slope. His orders were followed and the hill of Corton was planted first entirely with red grape varieties. Some time later, Charlemagne's fourth wife, Luitgard, was said to be displeased with red wine drippings on the white beard of the king and ordered that a section of the hill be pulled up and replanted with white grape varieties—a section that is today known as Corton-Charlemagne.

Though written records have noted acclaim for the white wine from the region as early as the 8th century, the early 19th century wine writer André Jullien made no mention of any white wine being made in Corton in his 1816 catalog of wine regions Topographie de tous les vignobles connus. However, Chardonnay is believed to be the "pinot blanc" mentioned by Dr. Jules Lavalle in his 1855 work on the terroir of the Côte d'Or, Histoire et Statistique de la Vigne de Grands Vins de la Côte-d'Or. In this work Lavalle noted that Pinot noir was planted on the middle slopes and lower ground of the Corton hill while "pinot blanc" was found on the higher slopes—an arrangement that is roughly the same as the vineyard plantings on the hill today.

== Geography and lieu-dits ==
At the very top of the hill of Corton are the densely covered woodland known as the Bois de Corton. On the slopes just below the woodland, most of the clay topsoil has eroded away leaving a narrow band of oolitic limestone mixed with marl. This band of limestone, which has a radial exposition of 270 degrees stretching from the east-facing lieu-dits of Bassess Mourottes and Hautes Mourottes above Ladoix-Serrigny to down south and west to northwest facing lieu-dits of Le Charlemagne above Pernand-Vergelesses, is most suited for white wine grape varieties and have historically been the source for Corton-Charlemagne wine.

Further down the slope, the vineyard soils transition from predominately limestone to having higher clay, iron, scree and ammonite fossil material that is most suited for red grape varieties. Here is found the lieu-dits of the Corton AOC though some vineyards, such as Le Rognet et Corton, Les Renardes, Le Corton, do have segments that overlap with the limestone band of Corton-Charlemagne. However, these vineyards, along with the Mourottes, are planted predominately with Pinot noir but the few Chardonnay plantings that do exist are permitted to be called Corton-Charlemagne.

The lieu-dits responsible for the majority of Corton-Charlemagne are Le Charlemagne, Les Pouget and Les Languettes.

== Climate and viticulture ==
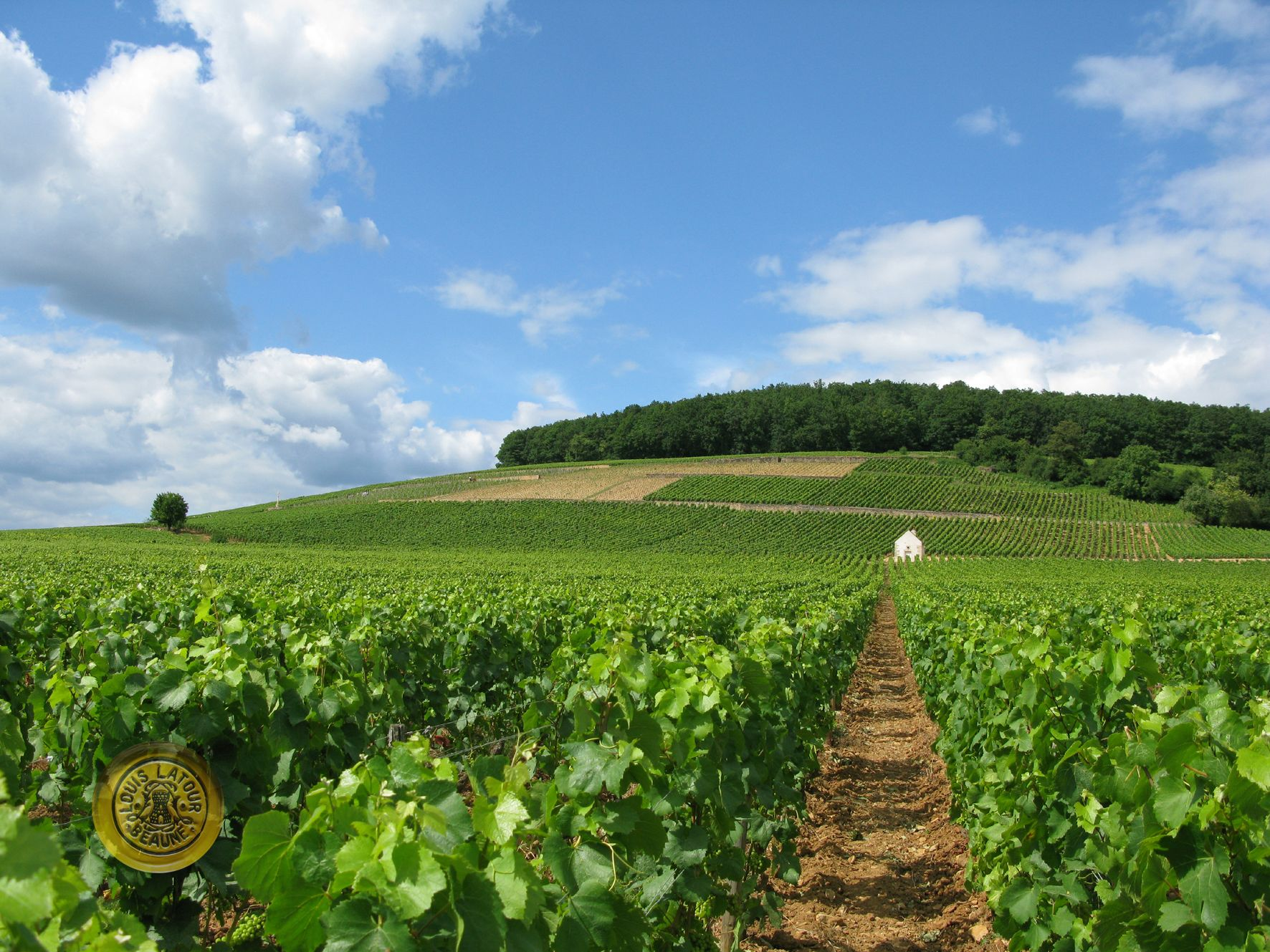
The top of the hill of Corton is heavily wooded with Chardonnay planted on the upper reaches of the slope where the soil is mostly limestone. Further down the slope as the proportion of clay increases, Pinot noir is more likely to be found.

As part of the Burgundy wine region, the hill of Corton shares the same continental climate as the rest of the Côte-d'Or. The particularly mesoclimate of Corton-Charlemagne is fractionally cooler, by a few growing degrees than the lower slopes that produce red Corton AOC. The majority of Corton-Charlemagne grapes come from the westerly exposed lieu-dits of Le Charlemagne and En Charlemagne. Being not as favorably exposed as the eastern facing lieu-dits of Corton, both the Chardonnay and few Pinot noir plantings on these slopes tend to ripen later than the Corton sectors, producing wines that tend to have slightly less body and richness to them.

As Chardonnay buds early, it can be highly susceptible to spring time frost. However, it is a relatively hardy vine that can sustain cold winter temperatures unless they become extreme such as the hard freeze that devastated the 1985 vintage with temperatures dropping to -27 °C (-16.6 °F) in the winter, killing off a large portion of vines. As both Pinot noir and Chardonnay were affected on the hill of Corton, one long lasting result of this vintage is that the cépage of many lieu-dits on the hill changed with some producers replanting their previously Chardonnay vineyards with Pinot noir to make Corton AOC and vice versa. Also many new clones and rootstocks were introduced.

Beyond spring frost, the other viticulture hazard that growers have to worry about is court-noué (also known as roncet) which is a virus transmitted from vine to vine by nematodes that causes the vine to develop small leaves with short internode segments. This can impact a vine's ability to receive adequate foliage coverage to capture the sunlight needed to complete photosynthesis. Another hazard that Chardonnay is particularly susceptible to is oidium/powdery mildew.

The Chardonnay vine has a tendency to produce excessive foliage which can hamper the ripening process with the vine diverting more energy to its leaves than to producing sugars and phenolics in the grape clusters. This requires Corton-Charlemagne growers to be limit the number of buds they leave with winter pruning and to be active during the growing season in leaf-pulling and removing excess shoots.

=== Wine grapes ===
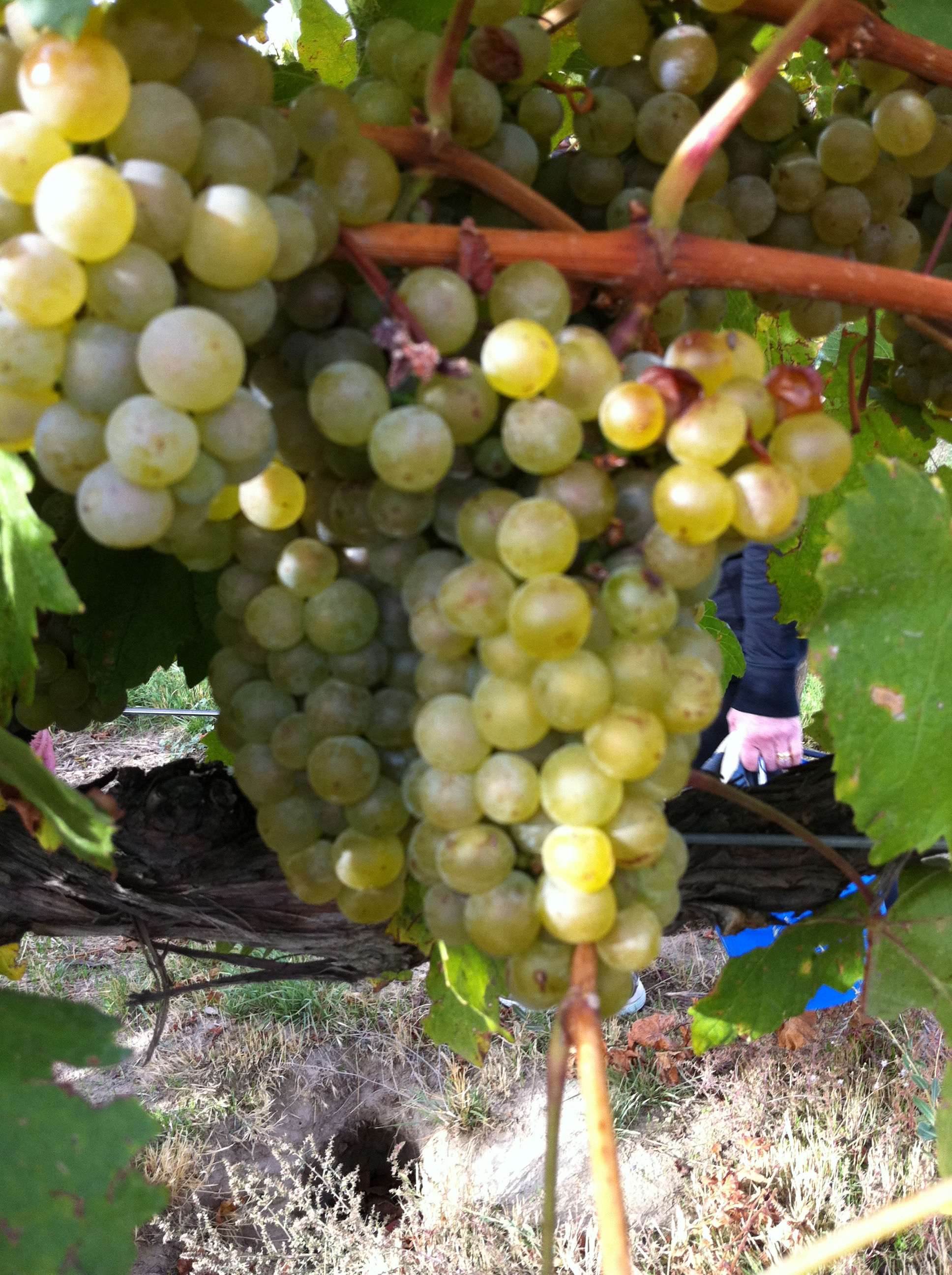
Chardonnay is the only permitted grape in the AOC wines of Corton-Charlemagne.

Today the only permitted grape in Corton-Charlemagne is Chardonnay. However, its presence on the hill is a relatively recent occurrence. Until the end of the 19th century, Aligoté was the main grape variety with Pinot Beurot (Pinot gris) and Pinot blanc also being widely planted at one point. In fact, Master of Wine Remington Norman noted in his book The Great Domaines of Burgundy that when the white wines of Corton and Montrachet were receiving widespread recognition in the 8th century, during the period of Charlemagne, that it was likely from wine that was made from field blends of indigenous grape varieties rather than the single grape of Chardonnay that both regions are known for today.

In Corton-Charlemagne, Chardonnay is valued for its ability to adapt to a variety of soils and micro-climates while reliably ripening to adequate sugar levels that don't necessitate much chaptalization. There is a risk, particularly with late-harvesting, that the acidity levels of the grape drop too much which can made a wine that is excessively flabby on the palate.

== AOC regulations and production figures ==
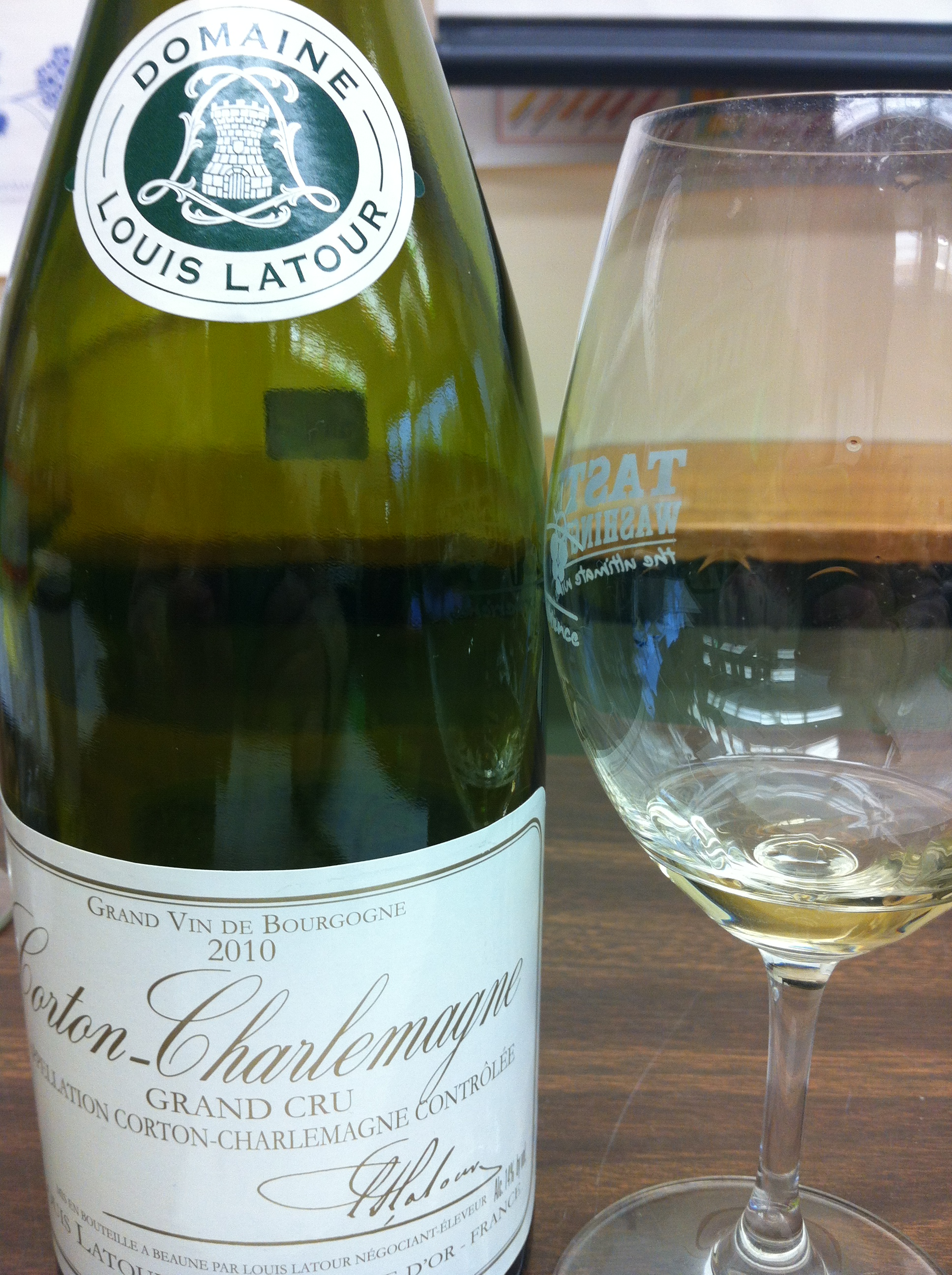
A Corton-Charlemagne wine from Louis Latour.

Wines labelled under the AOC designation Charlemagne and Corton-Charlemagne must be made from 100% Chardonnay that have been harvested at yields no greater than 40 hectoliters/hectare (approximately 2.7 tons/acre). There are no AOC specifications for aging prior to release but the finished wine must attain a minimum alcohol level of 12% by volume.

In 1998, the combined Corton-Charlemagne and Charlemagne grand cru contained 51 hectares (130 acres) that produced 2325 hectoliters of Grand Cru white wine. By 2008, those figured changed only slightly with 52.44 hectares (129.6 acres) of vineyard surface being in production within the AOC producing 2,237 hectoliter of wine, corresponding to just under 300,000 bottles.

=== Charlemagne AOC and Corton blanc ===
Out of the three Grand Cru AOCs that make up the hill of Corton, the Charlemagne AOC is the least used of these, as the majority of growers have elected to use the Corton-Charlemagne AOC for white wines from vineyards that are entitled to both appellations. In 2008, only 0.28 hectares (0.69 acres) of the En Charlemagne vineyard surface was in production for Charlemagne AOC, producing a total of 7 hectoliters (essentially three barrels worth of wine).

Similarly, white wines made from lieu-dits primarily used for Corton AOC (approximately 2 hectares (4.9 acres) of Chardonnay producing around 88 hectoliters of wine) can be labeled as Corton-Charlemagne or as Corton blanc.

== Wine ==
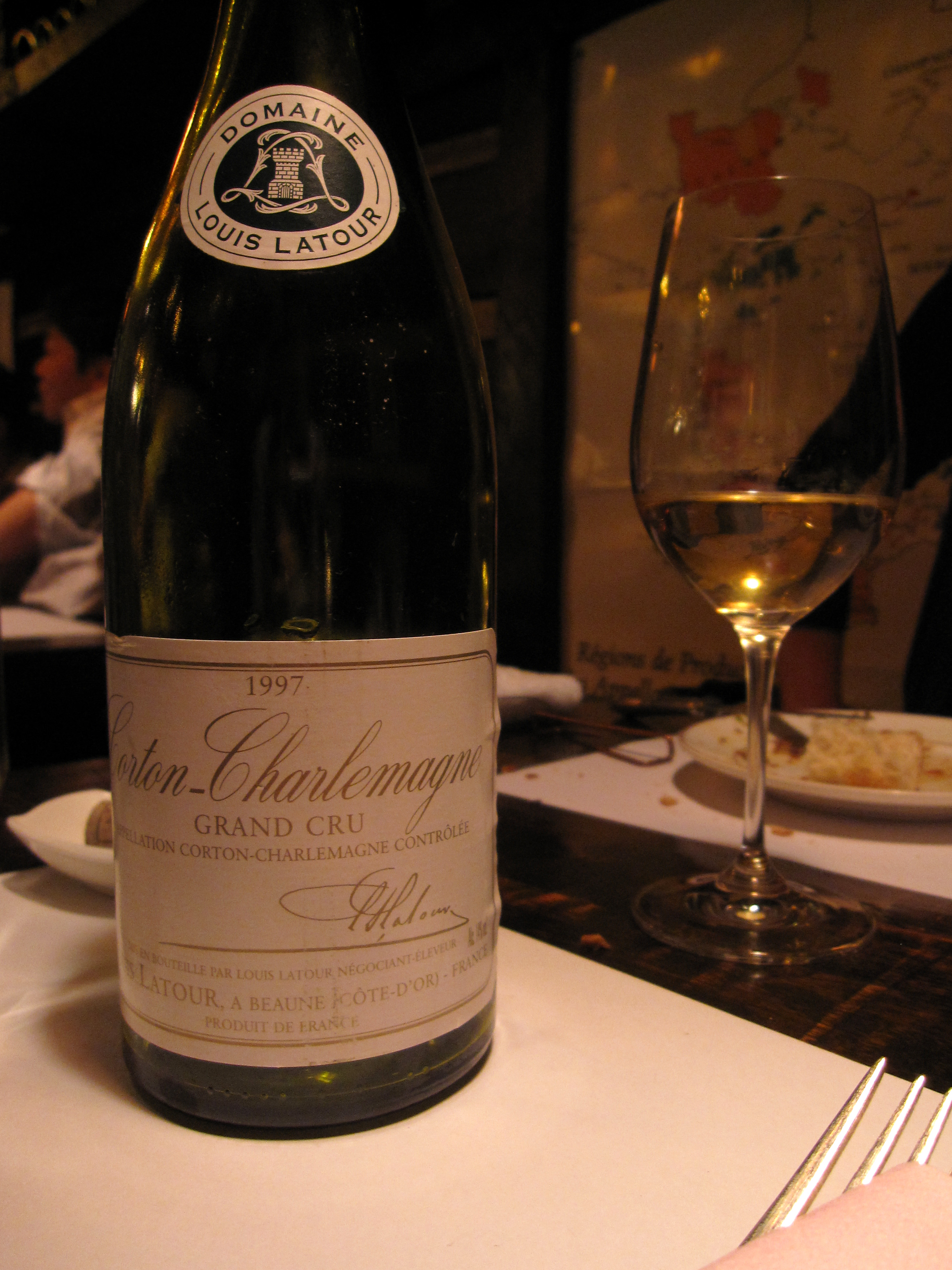
Corton-Charlemagne from négociant and vineyard land owner Louis Latour.

Master of Wine Clive Coates describes the Chardonnay of Corton-Charlemagne as being slower to mature than Montrachet with well-made examples from favorable vintages needing at least 10 years of aging before they are drinking at their peak. Coates note that the wines from the Pernand-Vergelesses side tend to have a flinty note and be characterized by more austerity than those from the Aloxe-Corton side that can be slightly more firm and full-bodied.

Wine writer Tom Stevenson describes Corton-Charlemagne as "the most sumptuous of all white Burgundies" with rich buttery and fruit flavors and notes of cinnamon, vanilla and honey.

== Growers and producers ==
Like most Grand cru vineyards in Burgundy ownership of the vines on Corton-Charlemagne is spread out among several growers with some doing estate bottling while other selling their portion of the crop to négociants who combine it with the produce of other parcels to make a single Corton-Charlemagne wine.

Among the owners of a 16 hectare section of Corton-Charlemagne that falls within the boundaries of the Aloxe is Hospices de Beaune and Maison Louis Latour while Bonneau du Martray owns a large part of the 19 hectare section along the Pernand-Vergelesses section with Domaine Comte Senard also having significant holdings.
