= Bonneau du Martray =

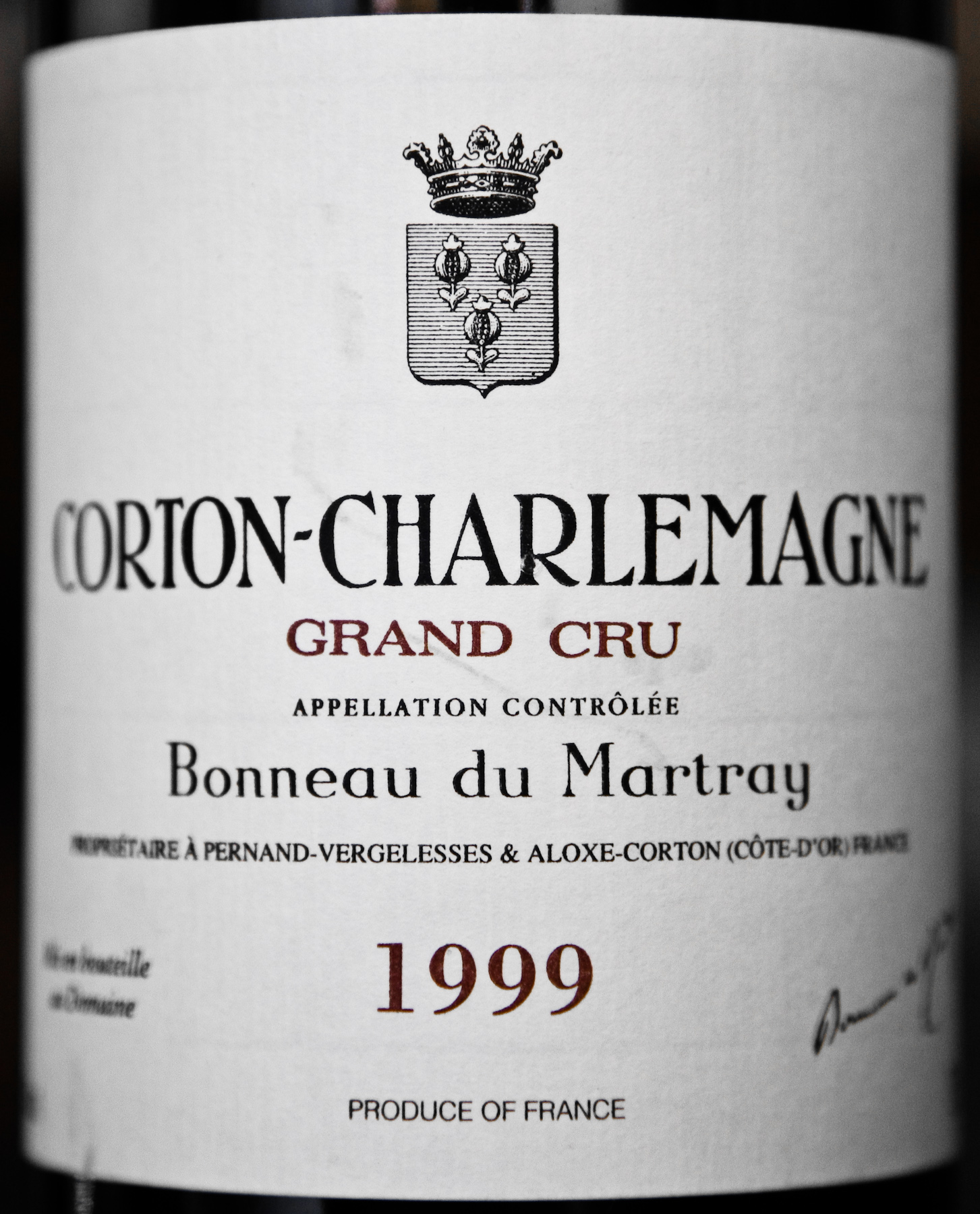
The label of a Bonneau du Martray Corton Charlemagne from 1999

Bonneau du Martray is a French wine grower and producer based in Pernand-Vergelesses, in the Côte de Beaune wine-growing region of Burgundy, France. Bonneau du Martray is the only estate in Burgundy to exclusively produce wine from Grand cru vineyards.

The estate was owned and managed by Jean-Charles de la Moriniere who inherited it from his father in 1994. Jean-Charles has been working on moving viticultural management and the care of the vineyard toward a biodynamic philosophy and away from the previous use of herbicides to manage weeds and pests. He has also worked to reduce yields significantly in an effort to improve the intensity and quality of the finished wine.

In 2017, the Domaine was sold to Stan Kroenke.

Only two wines are produced from the vineyard holdings of the domaine. A White Burgundy with Chardonnay grapes from the 9.5 hectares the estate owns in Corton-Charlemagne and a Red Burgundy with Pinot Noir grapes from 1.5 hectares owned in the Corton vineyard. Bonneau du Martray is the largest single owner of vines within the Corton-Charlemagne vineyard and owns the largest area of a single Grand cru vineyard of any producer in Burgundy.

Clive Coates describes Bonneau Du Martray's white Corton-Charlemagne wine as "one of the very greatest in all Burgundy" and Hugh Johnson lists Bonneau du Martray as one of the leading Côte d'Or producers and gives the estate his highest rating of 4 stars indicating "exceptionally fine or great quality, consistent over many vintages".
