= Aloxe-Corton =

- Commune
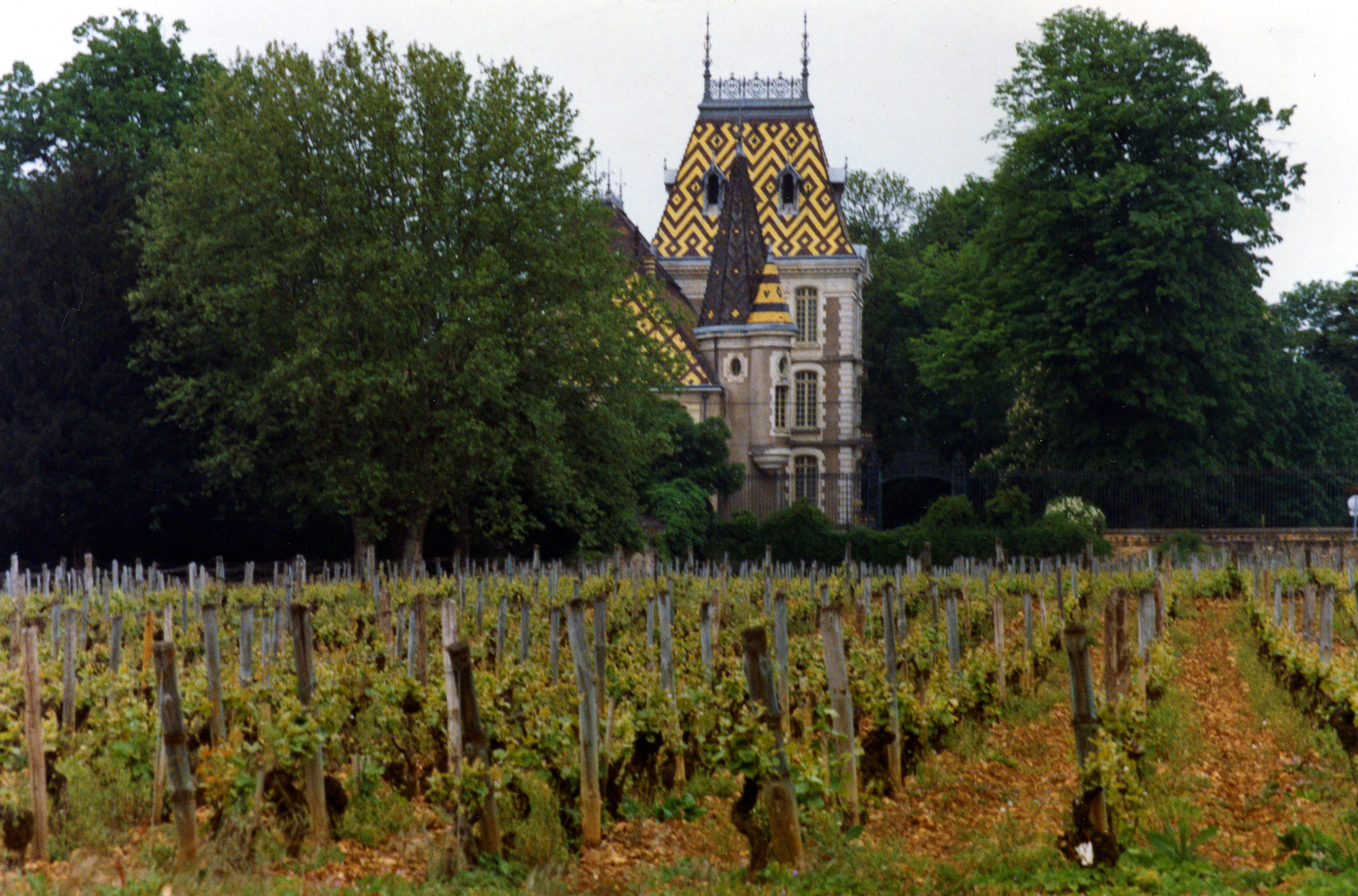
- A vineyard in Aloxe-Corton

- Coat of arms
- Location of Aloxe-Corton
- Location within France Location within Bourgogne-Franche-Comté
- Coordinates: 47°03′59″N 4°51′37″E
- Country: France
- Region: Bourgogne-Franche-Comté
- Department: Côte-d'Or
- Arrondissement: Beaune
- Canton: Ladoix-Serrigny
- Intercommunality: CA Beaune Côte et Sud

Government
  - Mayor (2020–2026): Maurice Chapuis
- Area^{1}: 2.63 km^{2} (1.02 sq mi)
- Elevation: 248 m (814 ft)
- Highest elevation: 360 m (1,180 ft)
- Lowest elevation: 218 m (715 ft)
- Population (2023): 125
  - Density: 47.5/km^{2} (123/sq mi)
- Time zone: UTC+01:00 (CET)
  - Summer (DST): UTC+02:00 (CEST)
- INSEE/Postal code: 21010 /21420
- ^{1} French Land Register data, which excludes lakes, ponds, glaciers > 1 km^{2} (0.386 sq mi or 247 acres) and river estuaries.

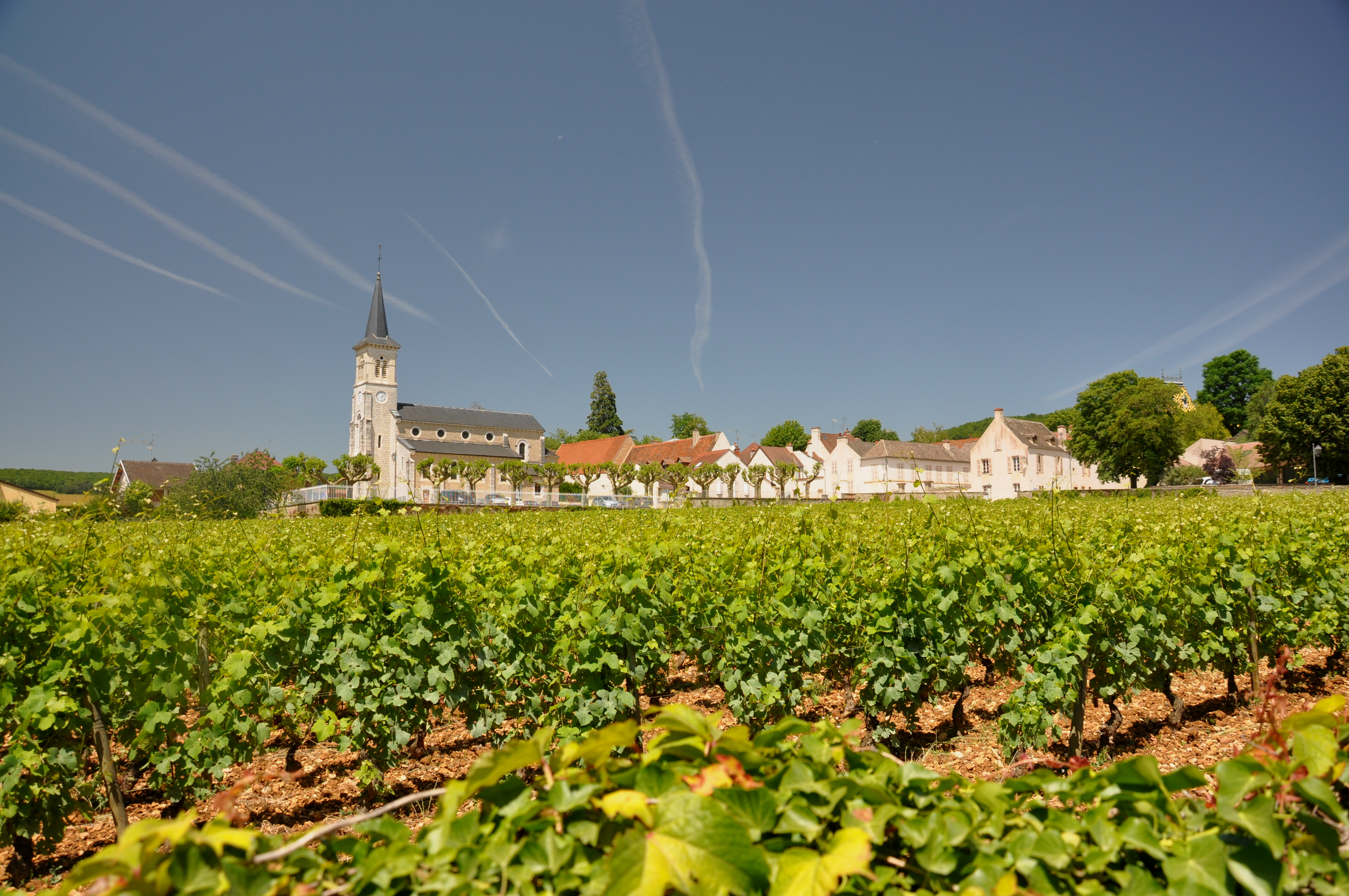
The village, surrounded by its vineyards.

Aloxe-Corton (French pronunciation: [alɔs kɔʁtɔ̃]) is a commune in the Côte-d'Or department in the Bourgogne-Franche-Comté region of eastern France.

== Geography ==
The commune lies about 4 km north by north-east of Beaune and 40 km south-west of Dijon at the northern end of the Côte de Beaune. There, the village of Aloxe is dominated by the Corton hill, nestled between the neighbouring communes of Ladoix-Serrigny and Pernand-Vergelesses. The D974 road forms the south-eastern border of the commune but does not enter. Access to the commune is by the D115D running north-west off the D974 to the village then continuing north-west to join the D18 road south of Pernand-Vergelesses. There is an extensive network of country roads throughout the commune which is entirely farmland, with the edge of the Bois de Corton in the north forming the northern border.

The only stream in the commune is the Fosse des Branots in the south flowing to the east.

There are no villages or hamlets in the commune other than Aloxe-Corton.

=== Climate ===
Aloxe-Corton has an oceanic climate (Köppen climate classification Cfb). The average annual temperature in Aloxe-Corton is 11.4 °C (52.5 °F). The average annual rainfall is 777.7 mm (30.62 in) with May as the wettest month. The temperatures are highest on average in July, at around 20.9 °C (69.6 °F), and lowest in January, at around 2.5 °C (36.5 °F). The highest temperature ever recorded in Aloxe-Corton was 39.7 °C (103.5 °F) on 31 July 1983; the coldest temperature ever recorded was −20.0 °C (−4.0 °F) on 9 January 1985.

Climate data for Aloxe-Corton (1981–2010 averages, extremes 1982−2002)
Month	Jan	Feb	Mar	Apr	May	Jun	Jul	Aug	Sep	Oct	Nov	Dec	Year
Record high °C (°F)	15.0 (59.0)	20.0 (68.0)	25.2 (77.4)	27.0 (80.6)	30.4 (86.7)	33.8 (92.8)	39.7 (103.5)	38.7 (101.7)	32.0 (89.6)	28.5 (83.3)	19.5 (67.1)	17.4 (63.3)	39.7 (103.5)
Mean daily maximum °C (°F)	5.3 (41.5)	7.2 (45.0)	12.0 (53.6)	15.0 (59.0)	20.1 (68.2)	23.4 (74.1)	26.7 (80.1)	26.6 (79.9)	21.5 (70.7)	16.2 (61.2)	9.1 (48.4)	6.1 (43.0)	15.8 (60.4)
Daily mean °C (°F)	2.5 (36.5)	3.7 (38.7)	7.6 (45.7)	10.2 (50.4)	15.1 (59.2)	18.0 (64.4)	20.9 (69.6)	20.8 (69.4)	16.3 (61.3)	11.9 (53.4)	5.9 (42.6)	3.4 (38.1)	11.4 (52.5)
Mean daily minimum °C (°F)	−0.4 (31.3)	0.3 (32.5)	3.2 (37.8)	5.4 (41.7)	10.0 (50.0)	12.6 (54.7)	15.2 (59.4)	14.9 (58.8)	11.2 (52.2)	7.7 (45.9)	2.6 (36.7)	0.6 (33.1)	7.0 (44.6)
Record low °C (°F)	−20.0 (−4.0)	−13.2 (8.2)	−5.1 (22.8)	−3.6 (25.5)	1.8 (35.2)	4.6 (40.3)	8.4 (47.1)	5.9 (42.6)	1.7 (35.1)	−2.5 (27.5)	−8.2 (17.2)	−12.8 (9.0)	−20.0 (−4.0)
Average precipitation mm (inches)	61.1 (2.41)	51.5 (2.03)	50.7 (2.00)	61.0 (2.40)	81.8 (3.22)	67.7 (2.67)	62.0 (2.44)	53.3 (2.10)	65.2 (2.57)	75.9 (2.99)	77.0 (3.03)	70.5 (2.78)	777.7 (30.62)
Average precipitation days (≥ 1.0 mm)	11.4	9.4	9.6	10.1	11.3	8.9	7.6	7.8	8.1	10.5	11.2	11.7	117.6
Source: Meteociel

== Etymology ==
Aloxe-Corton comes from the Celtic "al" meaning "high place".

The name of its Grand Cru vineyard Corton was added to that of the village on 22 March 1862.

== History ==
Legend has it that the Emperor Charlemagne granted the lands in 775, initially planting some 70 vines. The vines were located in the area of "Curtis Otto" (i.e. Corton). The beneficiaries were the Canons of the Collegiate Church of St. Andoche Saulieu.

=== Heraldry ===
Arms of Aloxe-Corton	Blazon: Or, an eagle crowned double-headed in sable terraced in base azure charged with a burgundy cup argent with two handles

== Administration ==
List of Successive Mayors of Aloxe-Corton

From	To	Name
2001	2026	Maurice Chapuis

=== Twinning ===
Aloxe-Corton has twinning associations with:

- Ürzig (Germany) since 1966.

== Demography ==
The inhabitants of the commune are known as Aloxois or Aloxoises in French.

Historical population

Year	Pop.	±% p.a.
1793	200	—
1821	236	+0.59%
1846	230	−0.10%
1872	240	+0.16%
1901	236	−0.06%
1926	238	+0.03%
1946	233	−0.11%
1962	285	+1.27%
1968	243	−2.62%

Year	Pop.	±% p.a.
1975	218	−1.54%
1982	198	−1.37%
1990	187	−0.71%
1999	172	−0.92%
2007	180	+0.57%
2012	149	−3.71%
2017	134	−2.10%
2023	125	−1.15%

Source: EHESS and INSEE

== Sites and Monuments ==
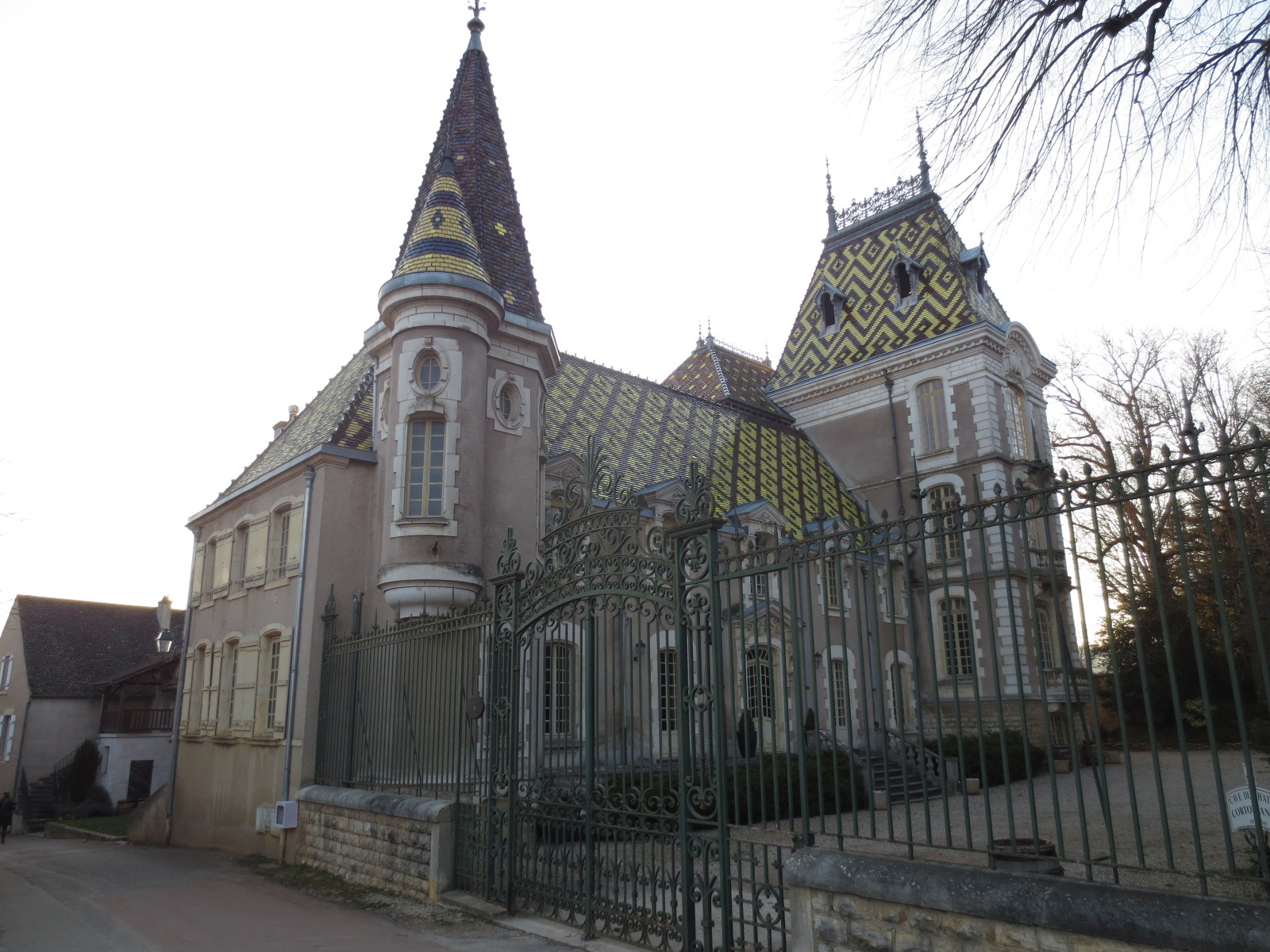
Château of Corton André from the 19th century

Aloxe-Corton has three castles and a church:

- Château de Corton Grancey built in part in 1749. The Cellars and the winery were built in 1834
- Château Corton André, built at the end of the 19th century, it replaced a charming 18th century house
- Château de Corton transformed between 1885 and 1890 to replace some very old buildings that had belonged to the family of Vergnette de la Motte, for several centuries. Before that it belonged to the Cîteaux Abbey
- Church of Saint-Médard from 1890 by Pinchard which replaced an ancient chapel which stood on the Place du Chapitre for almost 1000 years. It contains several items that are registered as historical objects:
  - Bas-Relief: Christ appearing to Saint Benezet (16th century)
  - Painting: Benefits of the faith, expectations, and true love (16th century)
  - Painting: Saint John the Baptist, Saint Catherine, Saint Gilles and a donor (1579)

There is also a Lavoir (Public laundry) (1902) which is registered as a historical monument.

== Wine ==
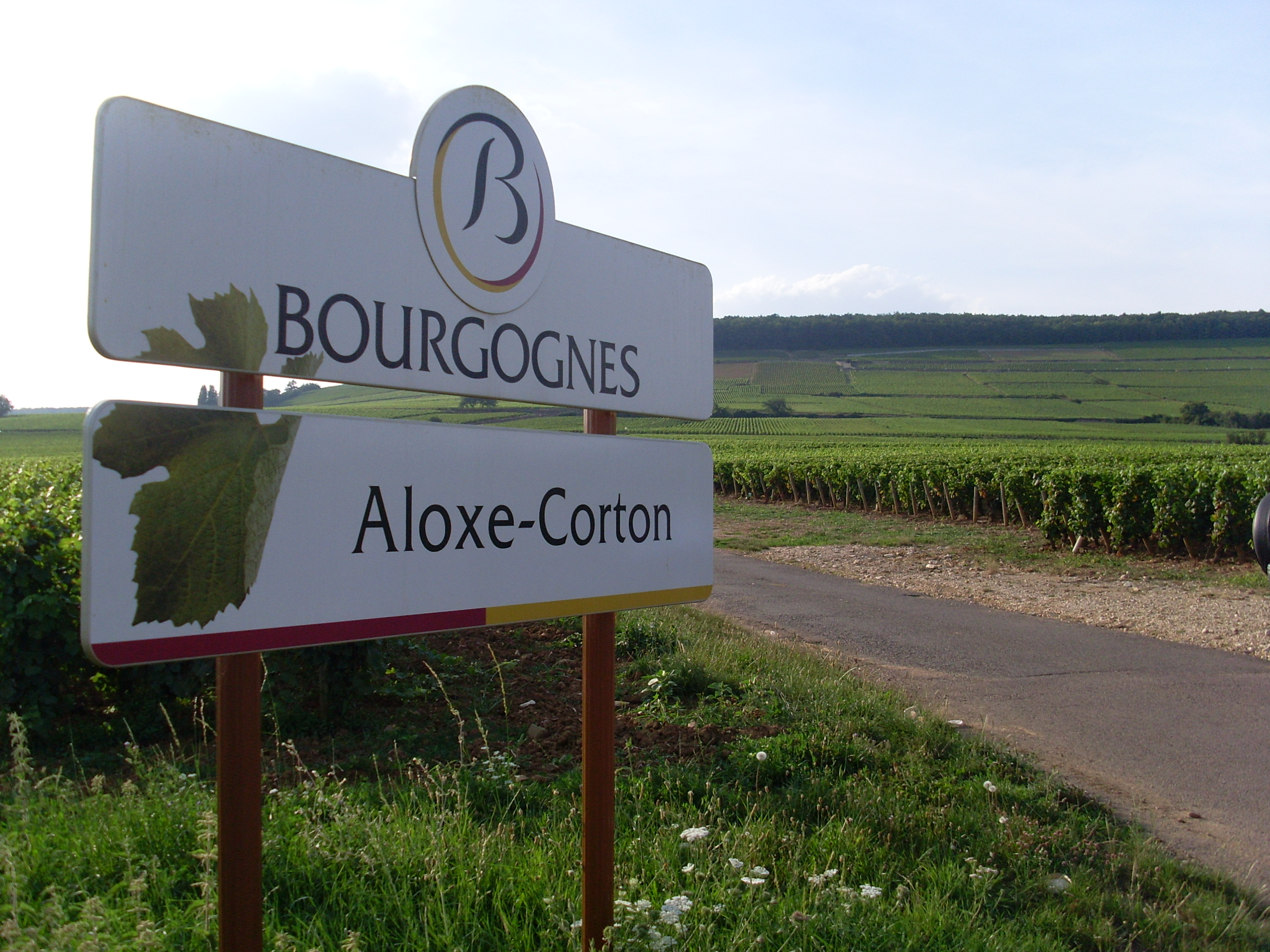
Sign and Vineyards

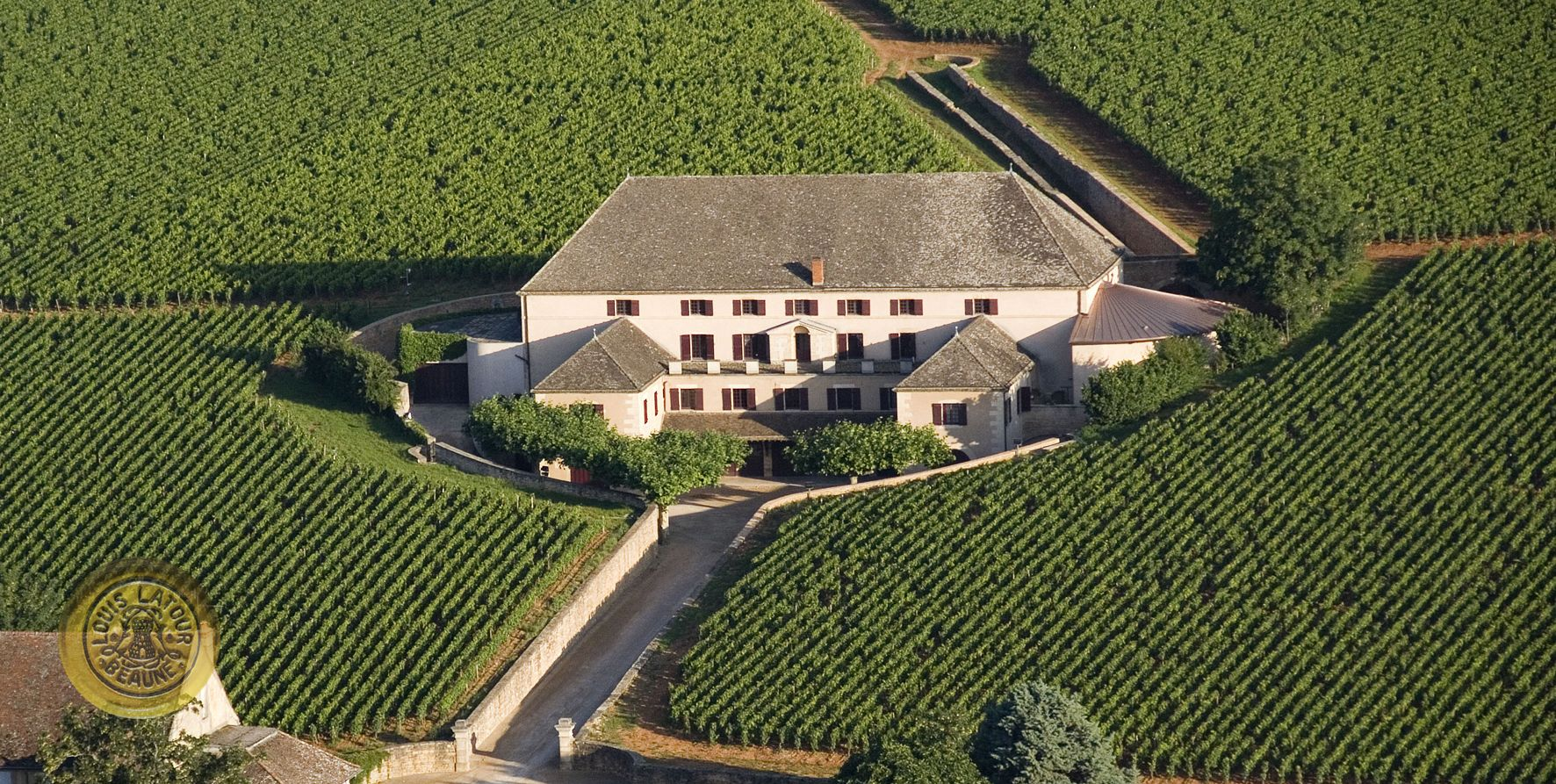
Cuverie Corton Grancey

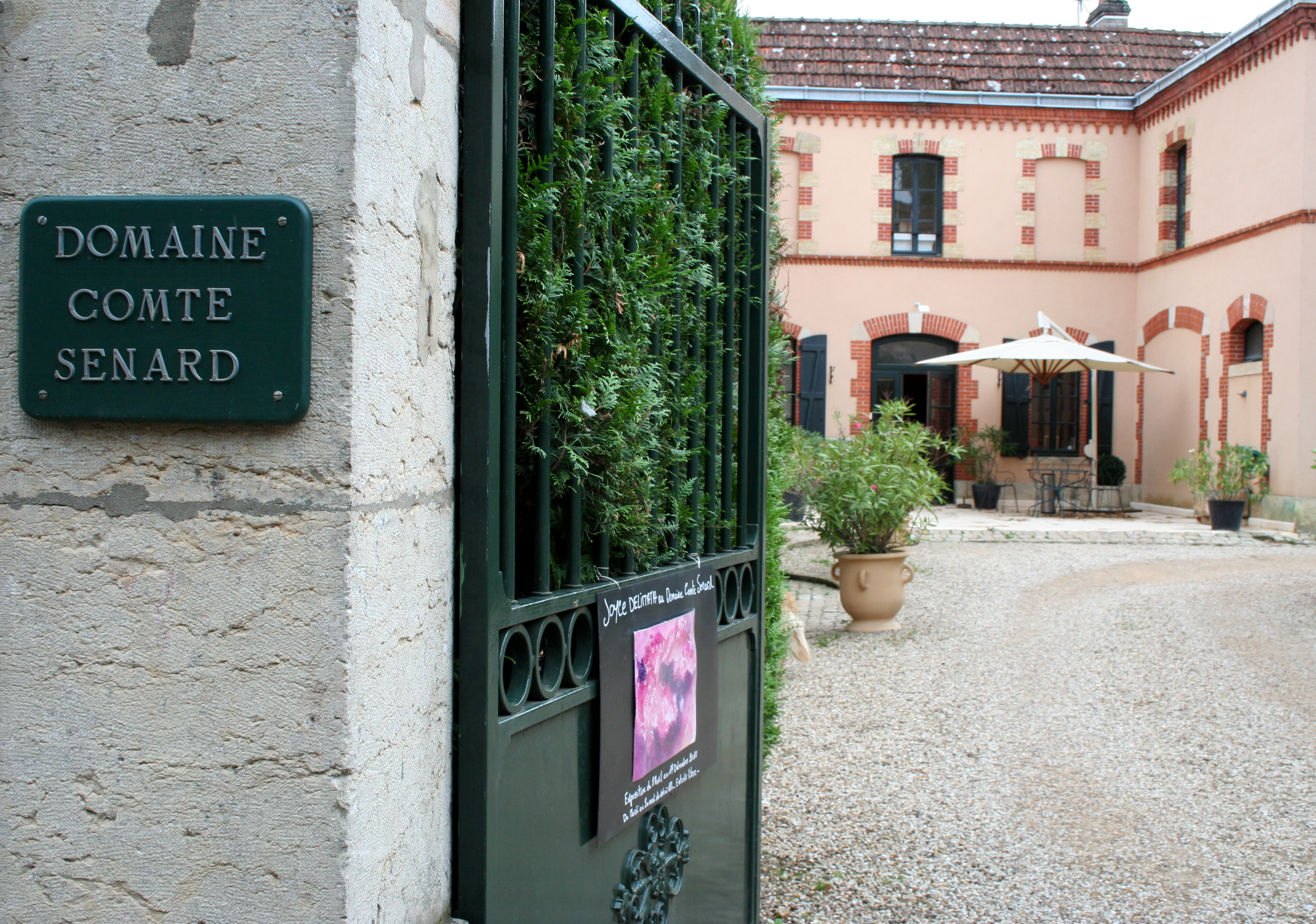
Domaine Comte Senard

Aloxe-Corton is one of the wine communes of the Côte de Beaune. The southern and eastern parts of the Corton hill, including most of its vineyards, are located in the commune, including vineyards used to produce wines under the two Grand Cru appellation Corton (mostly red, some white) and Corton-Charlemagne (only white).

=== Wineries ===
- Domaine Maurice Chapuis
- Domaine Bruno Collin
- Domaine Franck Follin-Arbelet
- Domaine Comte Sénard
- Domaine Michel Voarick
- Domaine Freddy Meuneveaux
- Domaine Louise Perrin
- Domaine Latour
- Château de Corton-André
- Domaine Jean
- Domaine Carlos

== See also ==
- French wine
- Route des Grands Crus
- Communes of the Côte-d'Or department

== Bibliography ==
- Historical Notice on the village of Aloxe-Corton, Charles Bigarne, Beaune, 1899 (in French)
- Monograph on the Commune of Aloxe-Corton, Joseph Delissey, Beaune, 1968, (in French)
- Aloxe-Corton, Claude Chapuis, Dijon, 1988 (in French)
- Aloxe-Corton - History of a Village, Henri Poisot, Beaune, 2007, (in French)
