= Beaune wine =

Wine farm

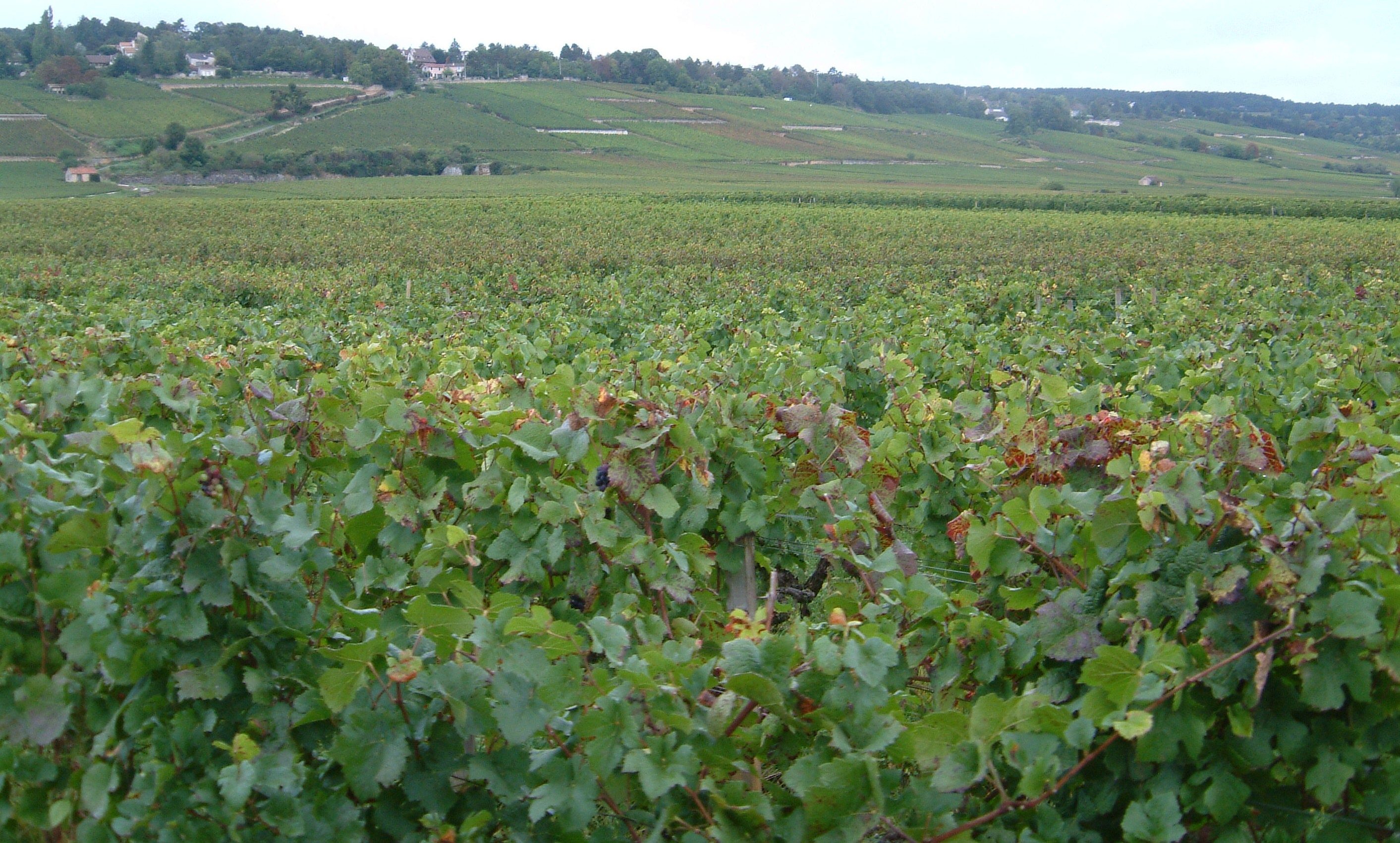
Vineyards just outside Beaune

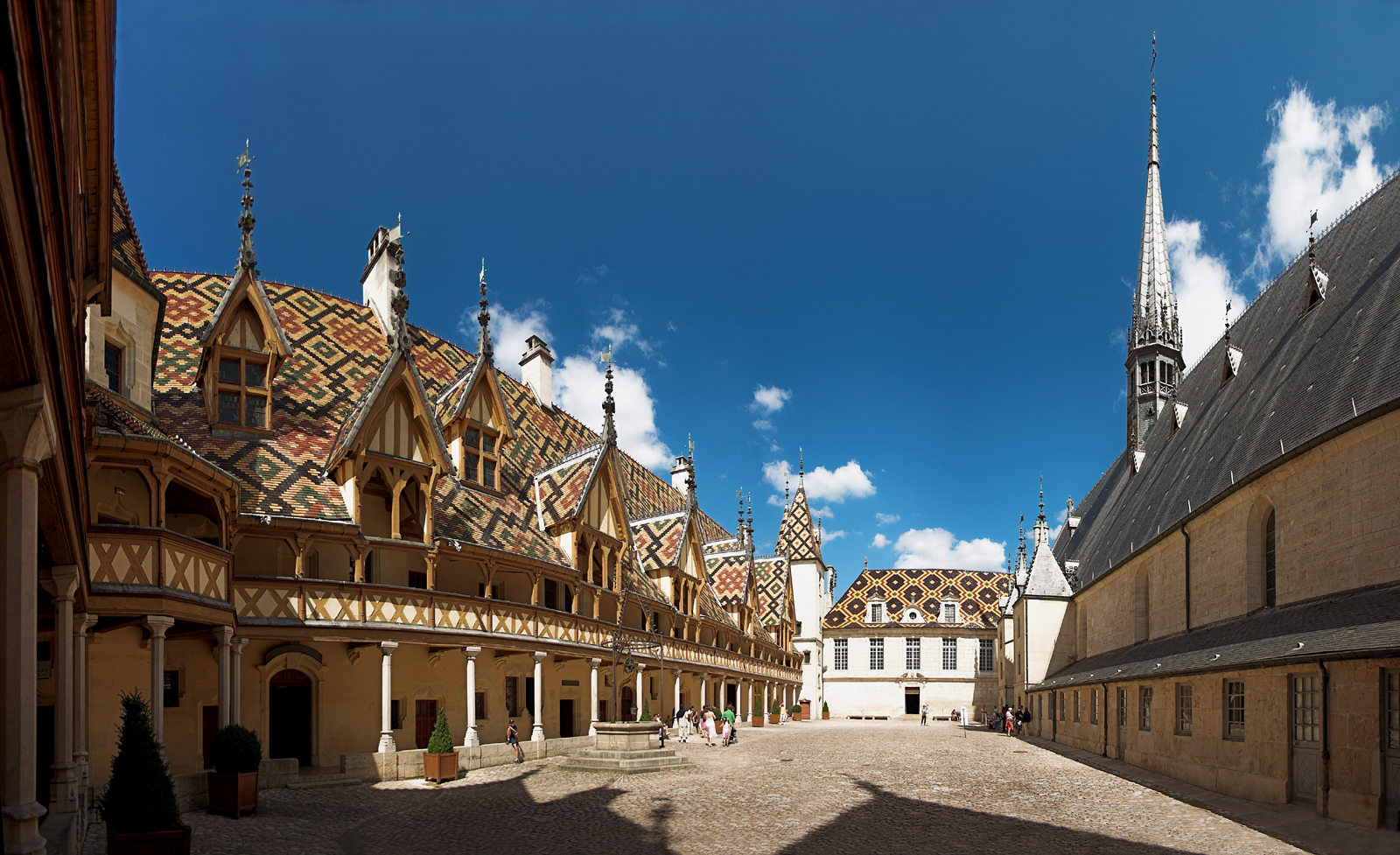
Hôtel-Dieu, the main building of the Hospices de Beaune and the location of the annual wine auction

Beaune wine is produced in the commune of Beaune in the Côte de Beaune subregion of Burgundy. The appellation d'origine contrôlée (AOC) Beaune may be used for red and white wine with respectively Pinot noir and Chardonnay as the main grape variety. The production consists of slightly over 85 percent red wine, and slightly less than 15 percent white wine. While there are no Grand cru vineyards within Beaune, there are several well-known and highly regarded Premier cru vineyards, including some that are owned by the large négociant houses in Beaune and produce some of their "flagship" wines at the Premier cru level. The AOC was created in 1936.

In 2008, there was 411.7 hectares (1,017 acres) of vineyard surface in production for Beaune wine at village and Premier cru level, making Beaune the largest village-named appellation of the Côte d'Or, just ahead of Gevrey-Chambertin AOC in vineyard size. A total of 15,652 hectolitres of wine were produced in 2008, of which 13,319 hectolitres were red wine and 2,333 hectolitres white wine. Some 357.06 hectares (882.3 acres) of this area was used for the red wines in 2007. The total amount produced corresponds to almost 2.1 million bottles, which included almost 1.8 million bottles of red wine and a little over 300,000 bottles of white wine.

For white wines, the AOC regulations allow both Chardonnay and Pinot blanc to be used, but most wines are 100% Chardonnay. The AOC regulations also allow up to 15 percent total of Chardonnay, Pinot blanc and Pinot gris as accessory grapes in the red wines, but this is not practised very often. The allowed base yield is 40 hectoliters per hectare of red wine and 45 hectoliters per hectare for white wine. The grapes must reach a maturity of at least 10.5 percent potential alcohol for village-level red wine, 11.0 percent for village-level white wine and Premier Cru red wine, and 11.5 percent for Premier cru white wine.

Beaune is also the centre of the Burgundy wine business, with most of the largest négociants located in the town, as well as the Hospices de Beaune, which annually holds a charity wine auction.

== Premiers crus ==
There are 42 climats in Beaune classified as Premier cru vineyards, located as a wide band across the commune, from its border with Pommard to its border with Savigny-lès-Beaune, on the Côte d'Or hillside just above (to the west of) the town. More than three-quarters of the vineyard surface within Beaune AOC is classified as Premier cru. The wines of these vineyards are designated Beaune Premier Cru + vineyard name, or may labelled just Beaune Premier Cru, in which case it is possible to blend wine from several Premier cru vineyards within the AOC.

In 2007, 315.07 hectares (778.6 acres) of the total Beaune vineyard surface consisted of Premier Cru vineyards, of which 274.63 hectares (678.6 acres) red and 40.43 hectares (99.9 acres) white Beaune Premier Cru. The annual production of Premier Cru wine, as a five-year average, is 5,231 hectolitres of red wine and 440 hectoliters of white wine.

The climats classified as Premiers crus are:

- Les Boucherottes
- Les Vignes Franches
- Clos des Ursules
- Les Chouacheux
- Les Épenotes
- Le Clos des Mouches
- Les Montrevenots
- Les Aigrots
- Les Sizies
- Pertuisots
- Clos Saint-Landry
- Les Avaux
- Les Tuvilains
- Belissand
- Les Seurey
- Clos de la Mousse
- Les Reversées
- Les Sceaux
- Les Teurons
- Clos du Roi
- Blanches Fleurs
- A l’Écu
- Clos de l’Écu
- Les Fèves
- Les Cent Vignes
- Les Marconnets
- En Genêt
- En l’Orme
- Les Perrières
- Les Bressandes
- Les Toussaints
- Les Grèves
- Sur les Grèves
- Sur les Grèves-Clos Sainte-Anne
- Aux Cras
- Le Bas des Teurons
- Aux Coucherias
- Clos de la Féguine
- Montée Rouge
- La Mignotte
- Clos des Avaux
- Champs Pimont

=== Flagship Beaune Premier cru wines ===
The "flagship" wines of the Beaune-based négociants are mainly the following:

- Clos des Mouches from Maison Joseph Drouhin. Both a red and a white Clos des Mouches is produced, with the white version usually commanding a slightly higher price than the red and holding the status as the most famous white wine from the Beaune AOC. It was included in Judgment of Paris. The two wines come from a holding of 6.82 hectares (16.9 acres), located in the southern part of the commune, on the border to Pommard AOC. It is planted to half of Pinot noir for the red wine and half of Chardonnay for the white wine. It was purchased in the form of several different parcels from different previous owner by Maurice Drouhin in the 1920s in order to create one large top-class vineyard for Drouhin.
- Clos des Ursules from Maison Louis Jadot. This red wine comes from a walled vineyard (clos) which is a part of the climat Les Vignes Franches in the southern part of the commune. It was purchased by Louis Henry Denis Jadot in 1826, and has remained in Jadot's hands since then.
- Vigne De L'Enfant Jésus from Bouchard Père & Fils. This red wine comes from a plot of slightly under 4 hectares (9.9 acres) which is a part of the climat Les Grèves, in the central-northern part of the commune. It has been owned by Bouchard since 1791, when property nationalised during the French Revolution was sold off, and was previously owned by Carmelites which had received it as a donation in the 17th century.

== Other "Beaune" appellations ==
The name "Beaune" also appears in the appellations Chorey-lès-Beaune AOC and Savigny-lès-Beaune AOC. However, these are separate appellations from two other communes that border on Beaune, and the lès-Beaune in these villages' names simply mean "near Beaune".

The entire subregion Côte de Beaune has been named after Beaune, and also appears in the name of Côte de Beaune AOC and Côte de Beaune-Villages AOC. Côte de Beaune-Villages AOC is appellation that can be used for wines from several communes, and are therefore typically seen as simpler appellations. Côte de Beaune AOC, often confused with Côte de Beaune-Villages AOC, is an AOC for a small number of vineyards high on the slopes above Beaune.

The Hautes-Côtes de Beaune is a subregion covering various smaller valleys immediately to the west of the Côtes de Beaune areas on or closer to the main Côte d'Or escarpment. They are sold as Bourgogne Hautes-Côtes de Beaune AOC.
