= Nuits-Saint-Georges wine =

French wine

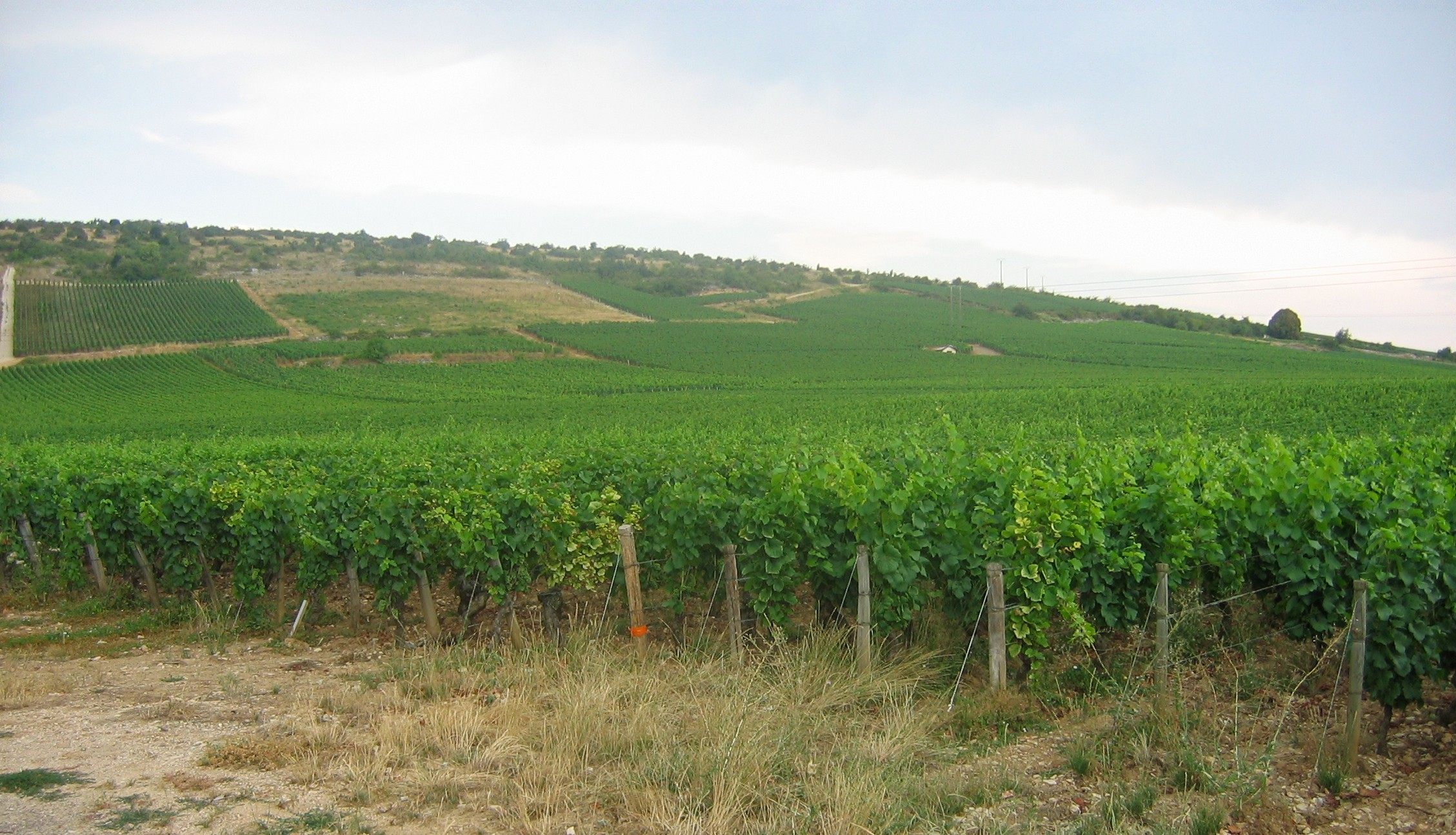
Vineyards outside Nuits-Saint-Georges

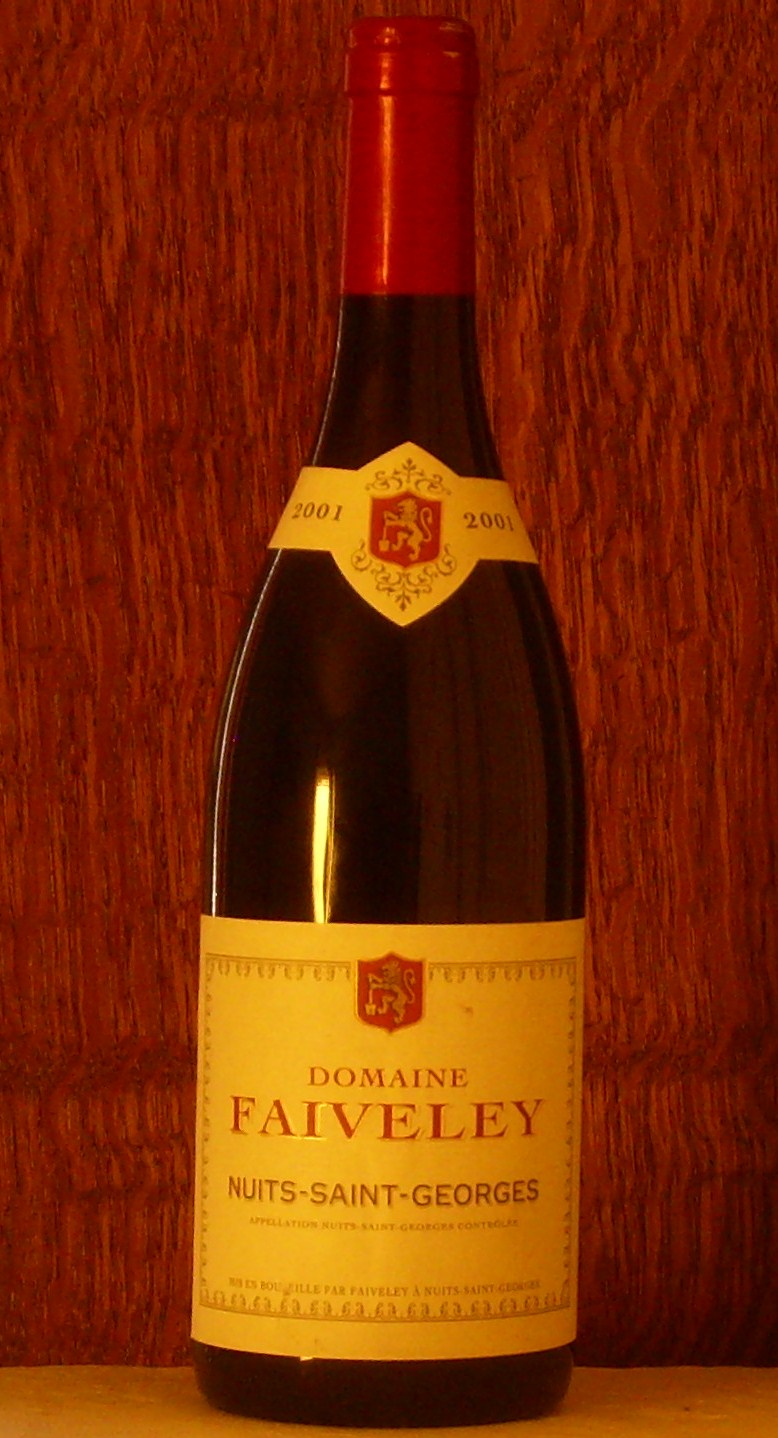
A bottle of Nuits-Saint-Georges wine

Nuits-Saint-Georges wine is produced in the communes of Nuits-Saint-Georges and Premeaux-Prissey in the Côte de Nuits subregion of Burgundy. The Appellation d'origine contrôlée (AOC) Nuits-Saint-Georges may be used for red and white wine with respectively Pinot noir and Chardonnay as the main grape variety. The name of the appellation is sometimes written simply as Nuits, without the Saint-Georges part. The word "Nuits" has nothing to do with "nighttime" but comes from the Latin for walnuts, nutium. The production of red wine dominates greatly, with around 97 per cent, and only around three per cent white wine. There are no Grand Cru vineyards within Nuits-Saint-Georges.

In 2008 there were 306.33 hectares (757.0 acres) of vineyard surface in production for Nuits-Saint-Georges wine at village and Premier Cru level, and 12,031 hectoliter of wine was produced, of which 11,703 hectoliter red wine and 328 hectoliter white wine. Some 7.03 hectares (17.4 acres) of this area was used for the white wines in 2007. The total amount produced corresponds to just over 1.6 million bottles, of which just over 1.55 million bottles of red wine and a little over 40,000 bottles of white wine.

The AOC regulations allow up to 15 per cent total of Chardonnay, Pinot blanc and Pinot gris as accessory grapes in the red wines, but this is not very often practiced. For white wines, both Chardonnay and Pinot blanc are allowed, but most wines are likely to be 100% Chardonnay. The allowed base yield is 40 hectoliter per hectare of red wine and 45 for white wine. The grapes must reach a maturity of at least 10.5 per cent potential alcohol for village-level red wine, 11.0 per cent for village-level white wine and Premier Cru red wine, and 11.5 per cent for Premier Cru white wine.

The Côte de Nuits subregion of Burgundy has been named after Nuits-Saint-Georges, which is the subregion's largest town, and which used to play an important role in the trading of these wines.

== Premiers Crus ==
There are 41 climats within the Nuits-Saint-Georges AOC classified as Premier Cru vineyards. The wines of these vineyards are designated Nuits-Saint-Georges Premier Cru + vineyard name, or may be labelled just Nuits-Saint-Georges Premier Cru, in which case it is possible to blend wine from several Premier Cru vineyards within the AOC.

In 2007 145.96 hectares (360.7 acres) of the total Nuits-Saint-Georges vineyard surface consisted of Premier Cru vineyards, of which 141.93 hectares (350.7 acres) red and 4.03 hectares (10.0 acres) white Nuits-Saint-Georges Premier Cru. The annual production of Premier Cru wine, as a five-year average, is 5,291 hectoliters of red wine and 215 hectoliters of white wine.

The climats classified as Premiers Crus are:

- Aux Champs Perdrix
- En la Perrière Noblot
- Les Damodes
- Aux Boudots
- Aux Cras
- La Richemone
- Aux Murgers
- Aux Vignerondes
- Aux Chaignots
- Aux Thorey
- Aux Argillas
- Aux Bousselots
- Les Perrières
- Les Hauts Pruliers
- Château Gris
- Les Crots
- Rue de Chaux
- Les Procès
- Les Pruliers
- Roncière
- Les Saint-Georges
- Les Cailles
- Les Porrets Saint-Georges
- Clos des Porrets Saint-Georges
- Les Vallerots
- Les Poulettes
- Les Chaboeufs
- Les Vaucrains
- Chaînes Carteaux
- Clos des Grandes Vignes
- Clos de la Maréchale
- Clos Arlot
- Les Terres Blanches
- Les Didiers
- Clos des Forêts Saint-Georges
- Aux Perdrix
- Clos des Corvées
- Clos des Corvées Pagets
- Clos Saint-Marc
- Les Argillières
- Clos des Argillières

== Other "Nuits" appellations ==
The name "Nuits" appears in two other AOCs as well. Since the entire subregion Côte de Nuits has been named after Beaune, it also appears in the name of Côte de Nuits-Villages AOC. This is an appellation for wines from several communes, including some which don't have a specific village appellation of their own. The Hautes-Côtes de Nuits is a subregion covering various smaller valleys immediately to the west of the Côtes de Nuits areas on the main Côte d'Or escarpment, and sold as Bourgogne Hautes-Côtes de Nuits AOC. Both are typically seen as simpler appellations than those named after individual villages.
