= Hautes-Côtes de Nuits =

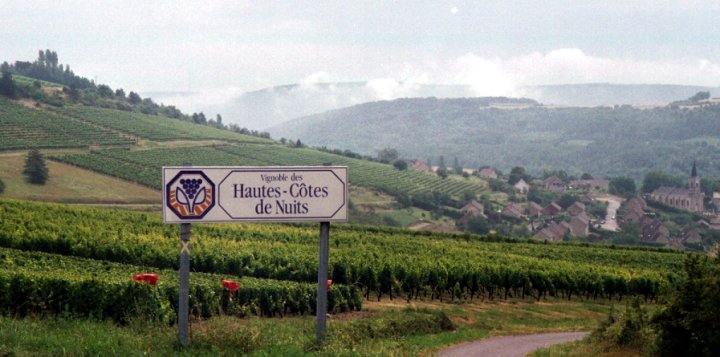
Vineyards in Hautes-Côtes de Nuits

Hautes-Côtes de Nuits is a subregion of the Burgundy wine region located to the west of the Côte de Nuits subregion. While Côte de Nuits consists of vineyards located on or close to the main Côte d'Or escarpment, Hautes-Côtes de Nuits covers the area on top of the escarpment, and the adjacent area of various valleys and slopes. Only one appellation d'origine contrôlée (AOC), Bourgogne Hautes-Côtes de Nuits, covers the entire subregion; there are no specific AOCs named after villages in this subregion, and also no Premier Cru vineyards. This AOC may be used for red and rosé wines with Pinot noir as the main grape variety, as well as white wines with Chardonnay as the main grape variety, and was created in 1961.

The AOC covers a number of communes in the Côte-d'Or department: 16 communes situated above the escarpment (the actual Hautes Côtes), and the top parts of four communes that are mainly situated in Côte de Nuits. The border between Hautes-Côtes de Nuits and Hautes-Côtes de Beaune to the south passes through Magny-lès-Villers.

== Production ==
In 2008, there was 656.97 hectares (1,623.4 acres) of vineyard surface in production in the Hautes-Côtes de Nuits, and 28.757 hectoliter of wine was produced, of which 22.656 hectoliter red wine (including a small amount of rosé) and 6.101 hectoliter white wine. The total amount produced corresponds to just over 3.8 million bottles, of which just over 3.0 million bottles of red wine (including rosé) and just over 800,000 bottles of white wine.

== AOC regulations ==
For white wines, the AOC regulations allow both Chardonnay and Pinot blanc to be used, but most wines are 100% Chardonnay. The AOC regulations also allow up to 15 per cent total of Chardonnay, Pinot blanc and Pinot gris as accessory grapes in the red wines, but this not very often practiced. The allowed base yield is 50 hectoliter per hectare of red wine and 55 hectoliter per hectare for white wine. The grapes must reach a maturity of at least 10 per cent potential alcohol for red wine, 10.5 per cent for white wine and wine.
