= Premeaux-Prissey =

- Commune
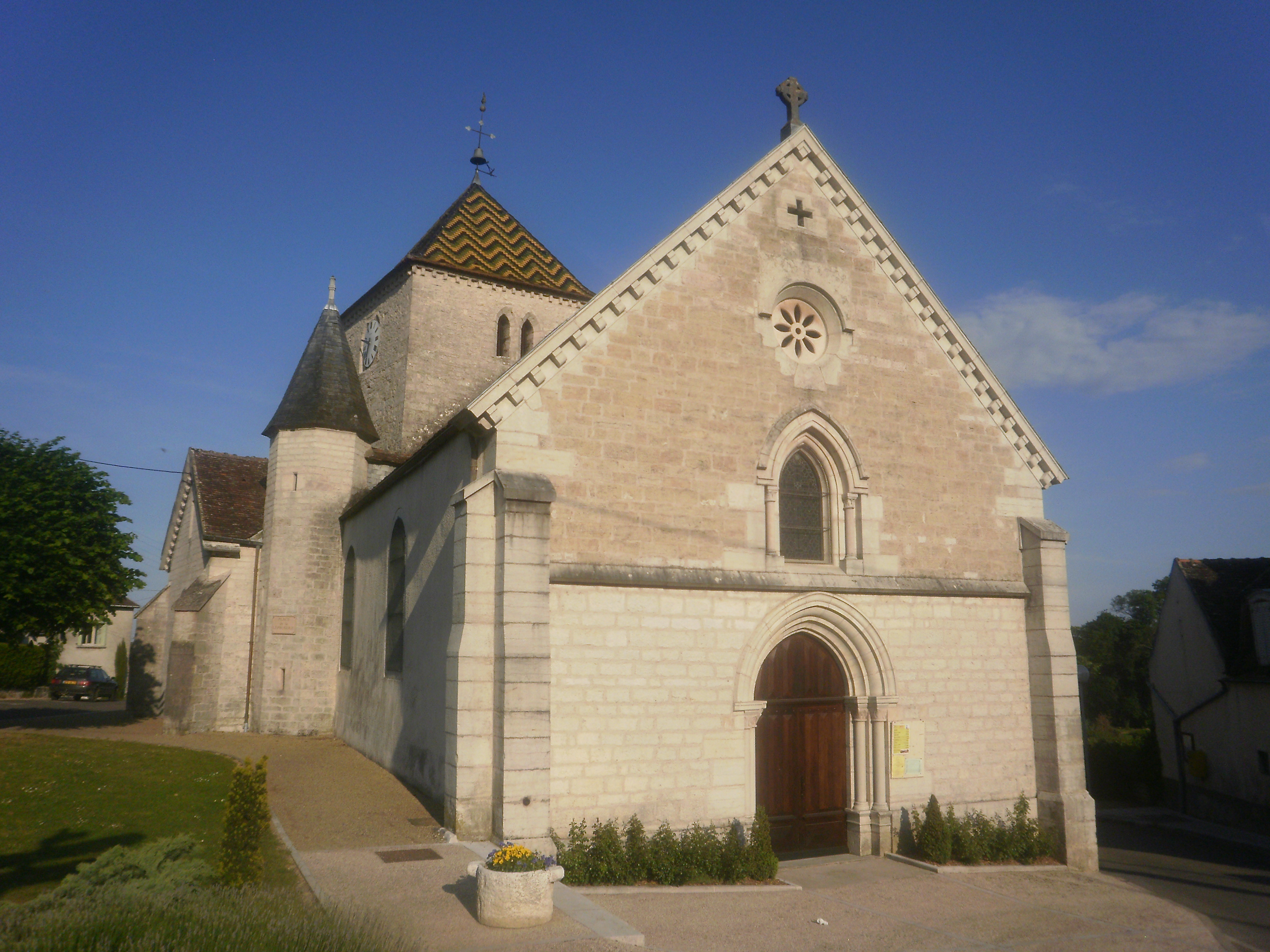
- The church in Premeaux

- Coat of arms
- Location of Premeaux-Prissey
- Location within France Location within Bourgogne-Franche-Comté
- Coordinates: 47°06′47″N 4°56′07″E
- Country: France
- Region: Bourgogne-Franche-Comté
- Department: Côte-d'Or
- Arrondissement: Beaune
- Canton: Nuits-Saint-Georges

Government
  - Mayor (2020–2026): Umberto Chetta
- Area^{1}: 9.05 km^{2} (3.49 sq mi)
- Elevation: 236 m (774 ft)
- Highest elevation: 374 m (1,227 ft)
- Lowest elevation: 203 m (666 ft)
- Population (2023): 377
  - Density: 41.7/km^{2} (108/sq mi)
- Time zone: UTC+01:00 (CET)
  - Summer (DST): UTC+02:00 (CEST)
- INSEE/Postal code: 21506 /21700
- ^{1} French Land Register data, which excludes lakes, ponds, glaciers > 1 km^{2} (0.386 sq mi or 247 acres) and river estuaries.

Premeaux-Prissey (French pronunciation: [pʁemo pʁisɛ]; also Prémeaux-Prissey) is a commune in the Côte-d'Or department, in the Bourgogne-Franche-Comté region, in eastern France.

== Population ==
Historical population
Year	Pop.	±% p.a.
1968	429	—
1975	379	−1.75%
1982	336	−1.71%
1990	332	−0.15%
1999	373	+1.30%
2007	340	−1.15%
2012	499	+7.98%
2017	393	−4.66%
2023	377	−0.69%
Source: INSEE

== Wine ==
Some of the vineyards in Premeaux-Prissey are part of the appellation d'origine contrôlée (AOC) Nuits-Saint-Georges, which is named after the neighbouring commune, and some only qualify for the more general label Côte de Nuits-Villages.

== See also ==
- Communes of the Côte-d'Or department
