= Hautes-Côtes de Beaune =

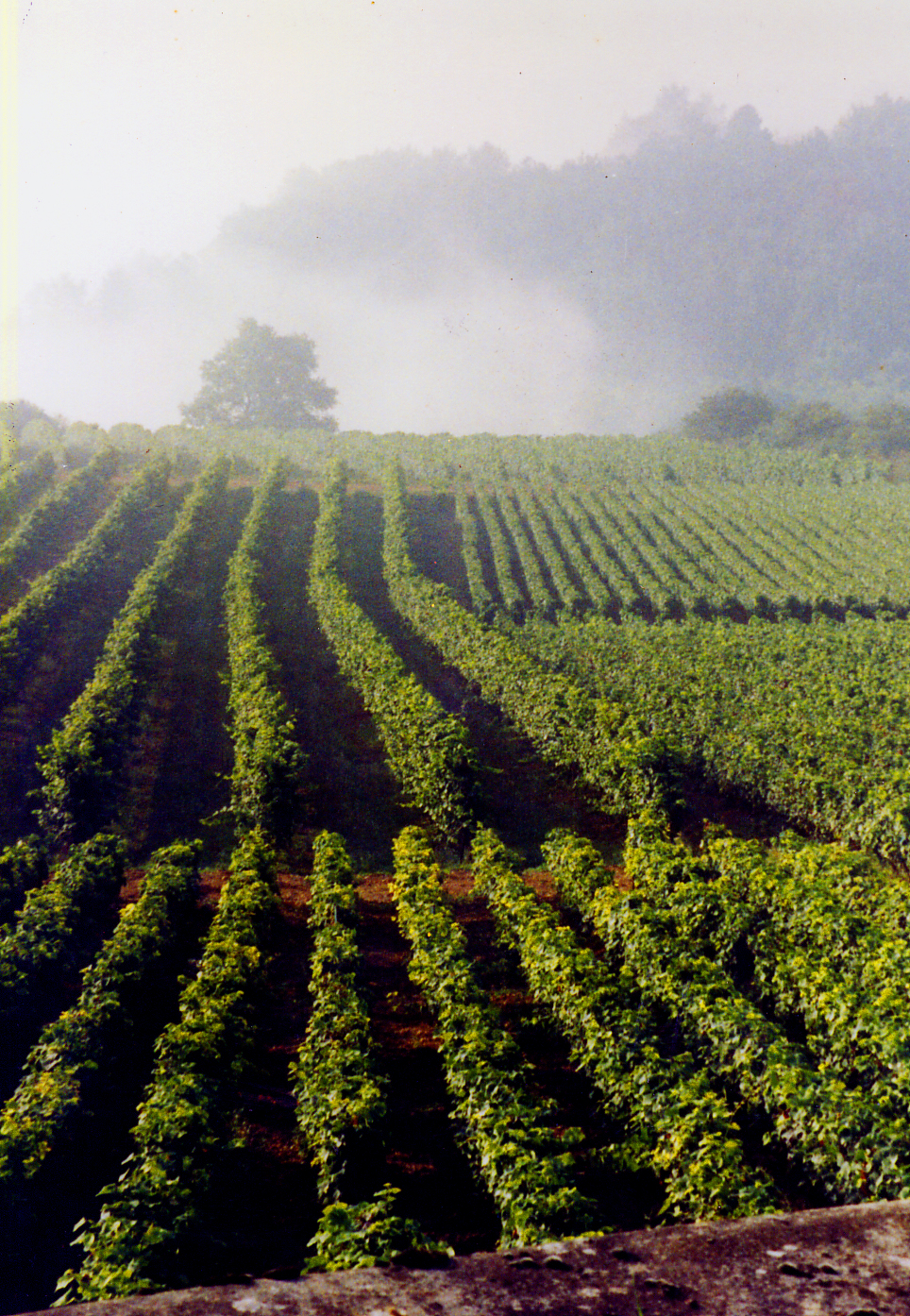
Vineyards of the Hautes-Côtes de Beaune, at La Rochepot.

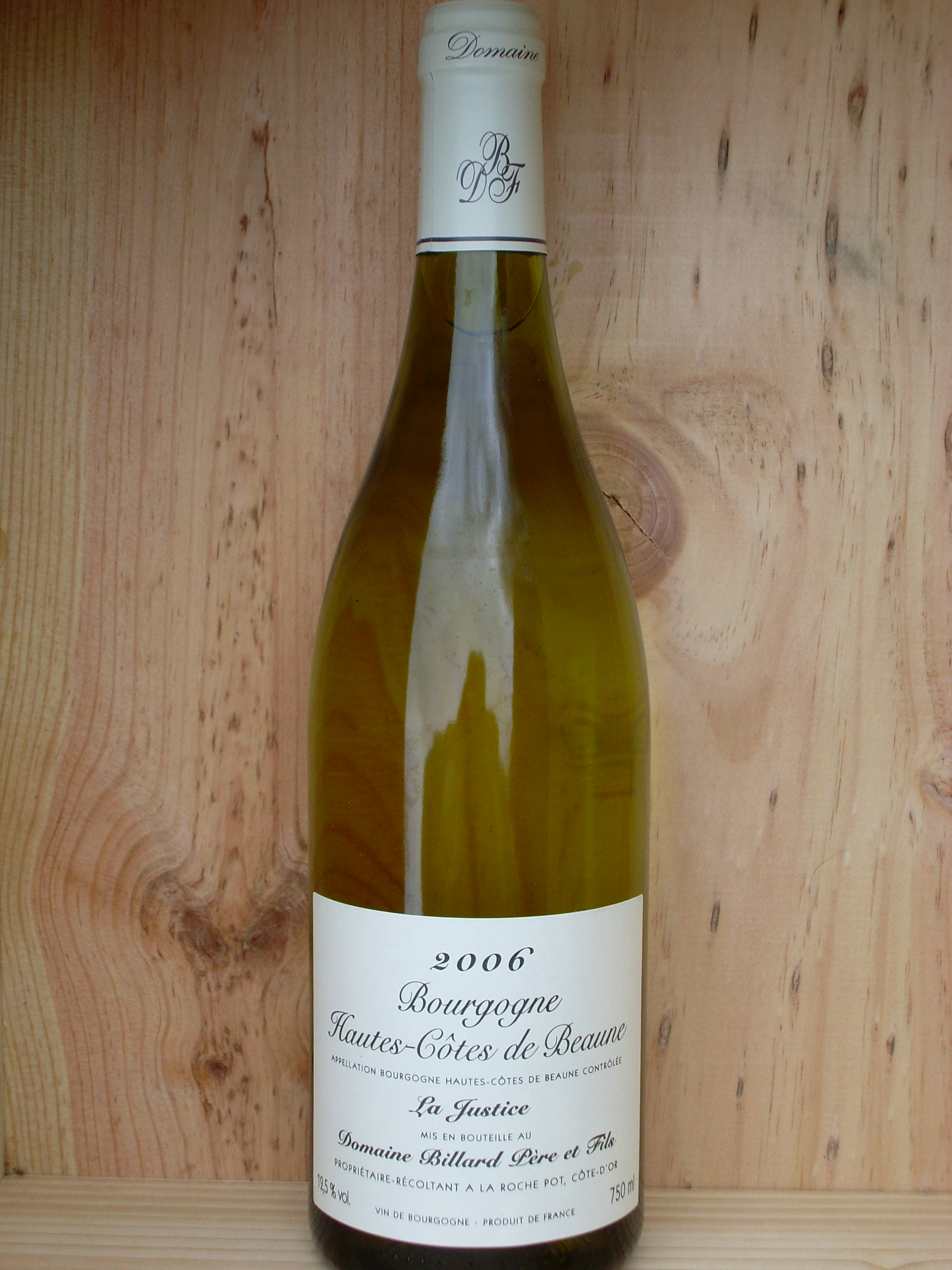
A bottle of white Bourgogne Hautes-Côtes de Beaune.

Hautes-Côtes de Beaune is a subregion of the Burgundy wine region located to the west of the Côte de Beaune subregion. While Côte de Beaune consists of vineyards located on or close to the main Côte d'Or escarpment, Hautes-Côtes de Beaune covers the area on top of the escarpment, and the adjacent area of various valleys and slopes. Only one appellation d'origine contrôlée (AOC), Bourgogne Hautes-Côtes de Beaune, covers the entire subregion; there are no specific AOCs named after villages in this subregion, and also no Premier Cru vineyards. This AOC may be used for red and rosé wines with Pinot noir as the main grape variety, as well as white wines with Chardonnay as the main grape variety, and was created in 1961.

The AOC extends into two departments:

- In the Côte-d'Or department: 12 communes situated above the escarpment (the actual Hautes Côtes), and the top parts of 10 communes that are mainly situated in Côte de Beaune.
- In the Saône-et-Loire department: four communes situated above the escarpment, and the top parts of three communes that are mainly situated in Côte de Beaune.

The border between Hautes-Côtes de Beaune and Hautes-Côtes de Nuits to the north passes through Magny-lès-Villers.

== Production ==
In 2008, there was 814.36 hectares (2,012.3 acres) of vineyard surface in production in the Hautes-Côtes de Beaune, and 39,496 hectoliter of wine was produced, of which 32,500 hectoliter red wine (including a small amount of rosé) and 6,996 hectoliter white wine. The total amount produced corresponds to close to 5.3 million bottles, of which slightly over 4.3 million bottles of red wine and just over 900,000 bottles of white wine.

== AOC regulations ==
For white wines, the AOC regulations allow both Chardonnay and Pinot blanc to be used, but most wines are 100% Chardonnay. The AOC regulations also allow up to 15 per cent total of Chardonnay, Pinot blanc and Pinot gris as accessory grapes in the red wines, but this not very often practiced. The allowed base yield is 50 hectoliter per hectare of red wine and 55 hectoliter per hectare for white wine. The grapes must reach a maturity of at least 10 per cent potential alcohol for red wine, 10.5 per cent for white wine and wine.
