= Chorey-les-Beaune wine =

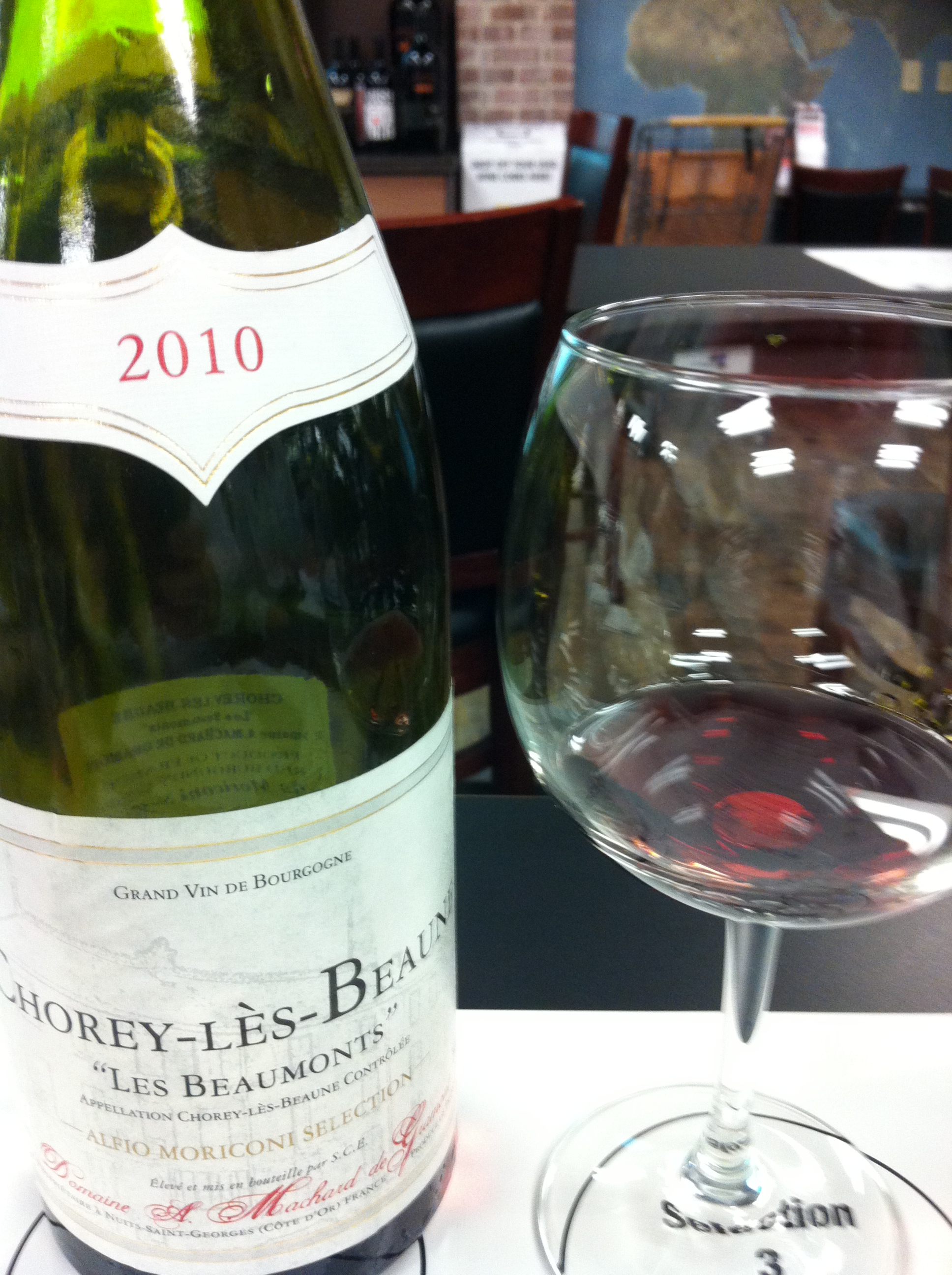
A bottle of Chorey-les-Beaune.

Chorey-les-Beaune wine is produced in the commune of Chorey-les-Beaune in Côte de Beaune of Burgundy. The Appellation d'origine contrôlée (AOC) Chorey-les-Beaune, which may also be written Chorey, may be used for red and white wine with respectively Pinot noir and Chardonnay as the main grape variety. More than 90 per cent of the production consists of red wine. There are no Grand Cru and no Premier Cru vineyards within Chorey-les-Beaune wine. Chorey-les-Beaune wine is sometimes declassified to Côte de Beaune-Villages, which is an appellation that allow négociants to sell wine blended from several villages. The AOC was created in 1970.

== Production ==
In 2008, there were 133.65 hectares (330.3 acres) of vineyard surface in production for Chorey-les-Beaune wine, and 5,237 hectoliters of wine was produced, of which 4,913 hectoliters were red and 324 hectoliters were white. Some 6.13 hectares (15.1 acres) of this area was used for the white wines in 2007. The total amount produced corresponds to just under 700,000 bottles, of which slightly over 650,000 bottles were red wine and just over 40,000 bottles were white wine.

For white wines, the AOC regulations allow both Chardonnay and Pinot blanc to be used, but most wines are 100% Chardonnay. The AOC regulations also allow up to 15 per cent total of Chardonnay, Pinot blanc and Pinot gris as accessory grapes in the red wines, but this not very often practiced. The allowed base yield is 40 hectoliters per hectare of red wine and 45 hectoliters per hectare for white wine. The grapes must reach a maturity of at least 10.5 per cent potential alcohol for red wine and 11.0 per cent for white wine.
