= Magny-lès-Villers =

- Commune
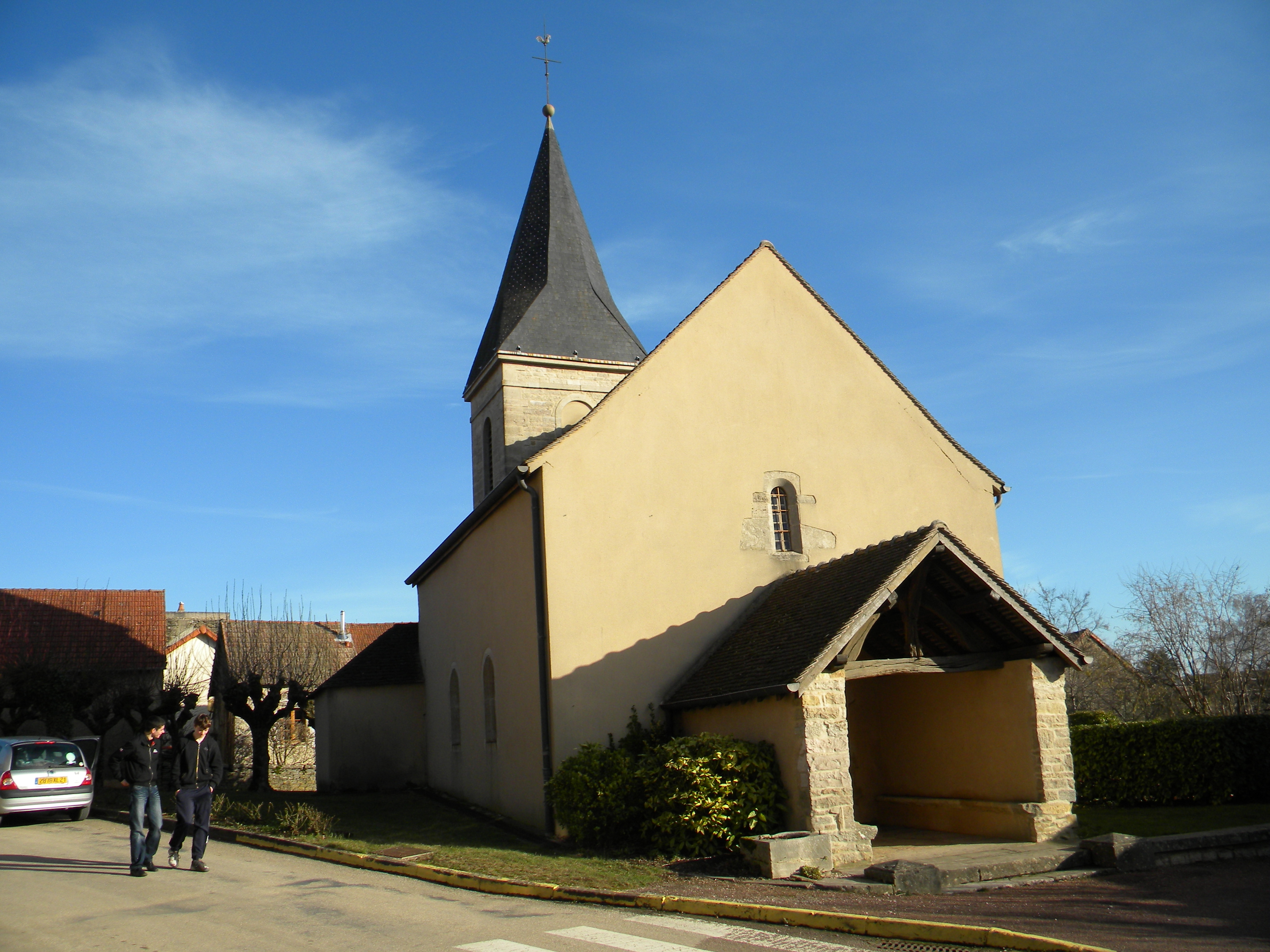
- The church in Magny-lès-Villers

- Coat of arms
- Location of Magny-lès-Villers
- Location within France Location within Bourgogne-Franche-Comté
- Coordinates: 47°05′52″N 4°52′33″E
- Country: France
- Region: Bourgogne-Franche-Comté
- Department: Côte-d'Or
- Arrondissement: Beaune
- Canton: Nuits-Saint-Georges

Government
  - Mayor (2020–2026): Valérie Dureuil
- Area^{1}: 3.83 km^{2} (1.48 sq mi)
- Elevation: 350 m (1,150 ft)
- Highest elevation: 423 m (1,388 ft)
- Lowest elevation: 253 m (830 ft)
- Population (2023): 229
  - Density: 59.8/km^{2} (155/sq mi)
- Time zone: UTC+01:00 (CET)
  - Summer (DST): UTC+02:00 (CEST)
- INSEE/Postal code: 21368 /21700
- ^{1} French Land Register data, which excludes lakes, ponds, glaciers > 1 km^{2} (0.386 sq mi or 247 acres) and river estuaries.

Magny-lès-Villers is a commune in the Côte-d'Or department in eastern France.

== Population ==
Historical population
Year	Pop.	±% p.a.
1968	207	—
1975	184	−1.67%
1982	224	+2.85%
1990	242	+0.97%
1999	246	+0.18%
2007	260	+0.69%
2012	254	−0.47%
2017	243	−0.88%
2023	229	−0.98%
Source: INSEE

== See also ==
- Communes of the Côte-d'Or department
