= Guye (river) =

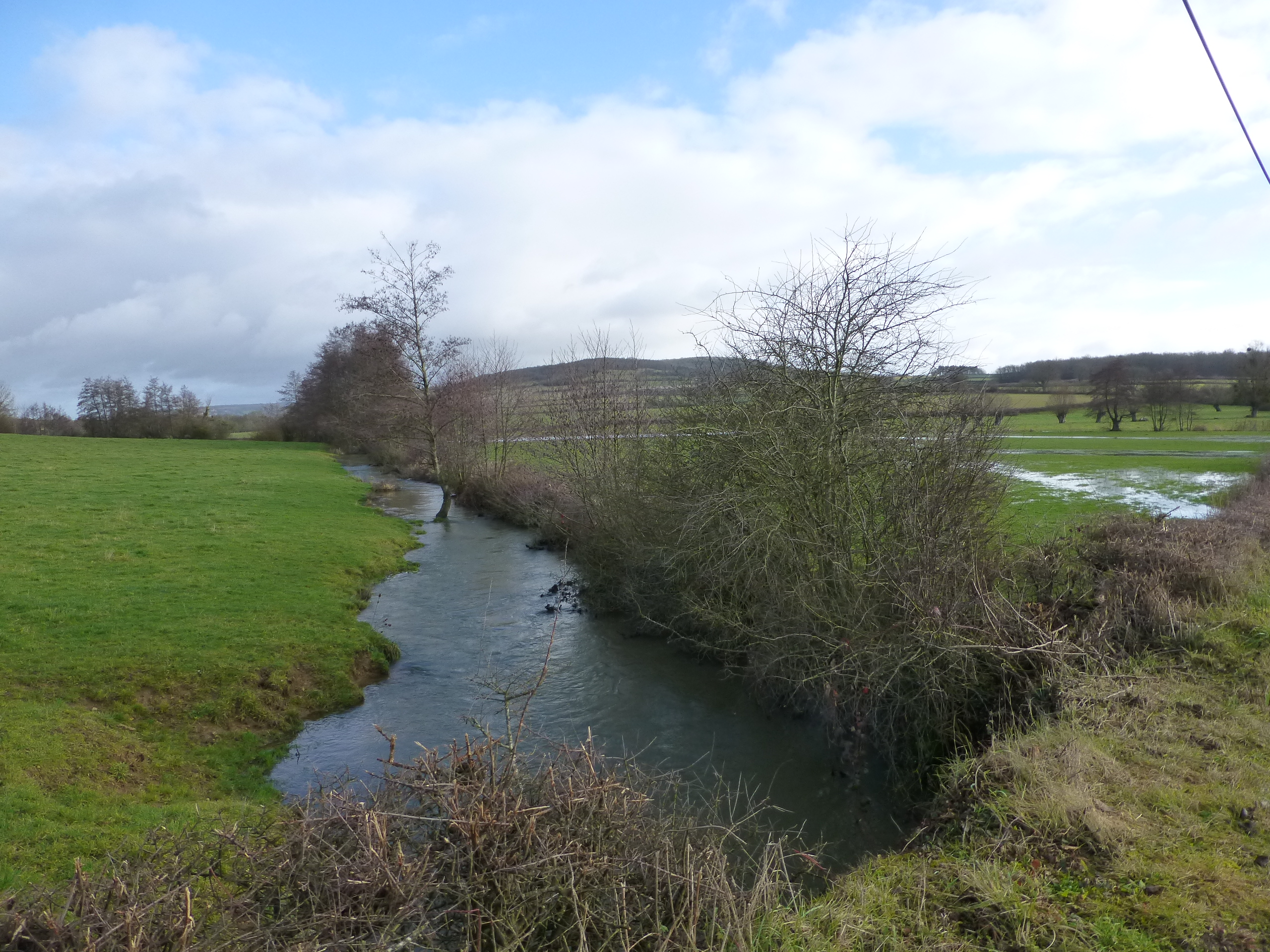
- The Guye River in Savianges

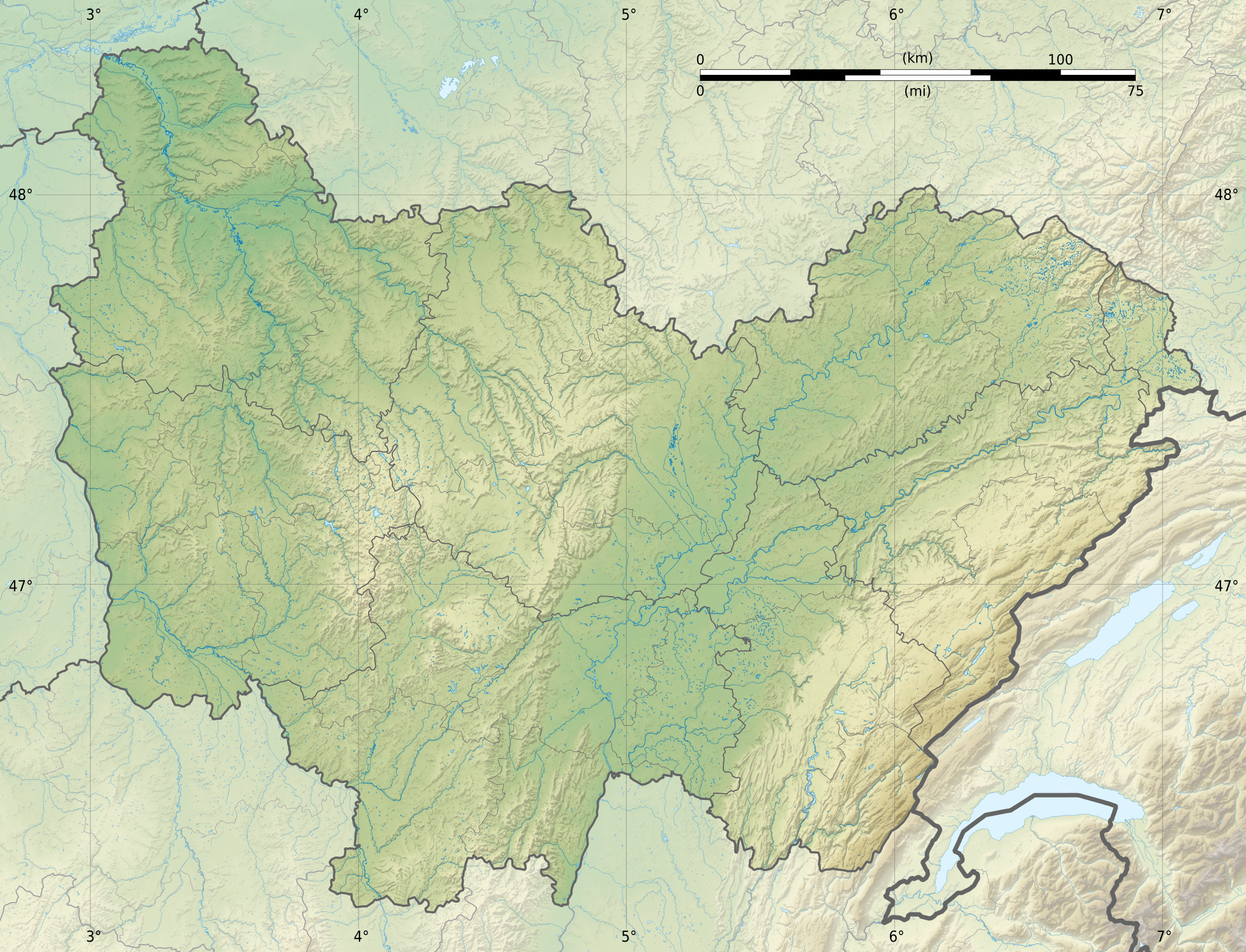
- Location within France Location within Bourgogne-Franche-Comté

Location
- Country: France

Physical characteristics
- Source
  - location: Sainte-Hélène
  - coordinates: 46°46′4.80″N 04°38′45.60″E
- Mouth
  - location: Grosne
  - coordinates: 46°34′9.99″N 04°39′40.90″E
- Length: 46.6 km (29.0 mi)
- Basin size: 430.00 km^{2} (166.02 sq mi)

Basin features
- Progression: Grosne→ Saône→ Rhône→ Mediterranean Sea

The Guye (French pronunciation: [ɡi]) is a 46.6-kilometre (29.0 mi) long river in the Saône-et-Loire département, central eastern France. It flows primarily south, before turning east-northeast near Salornay-sur-Guye and flowing into the Grosne. It is a left tributary of the Grosne into which it flows between Malay and Savigny-sur-Grosne.

== Communes along its course ==
The following communes, ordered from source to mouth, lie along the Guye:

- Sainte-Hélène
- Moroges
- Bissey-sous-Cruchaud
- Sassangy
- Cersot
- Savianges
- Germagny
- Saint-Martin-du-Tartre
- Genouilly
- Joncy
- Burzy
- Saint-Martin-la-Patrouille
- Saint-Huruge
- Sailly
- Sigy-le-Châtel
- Salornay-sur-Guye
- Cortevaix
- Bonnay
- Malay
- Savigny-sur-Grosne
