= Germagny =

- Commune
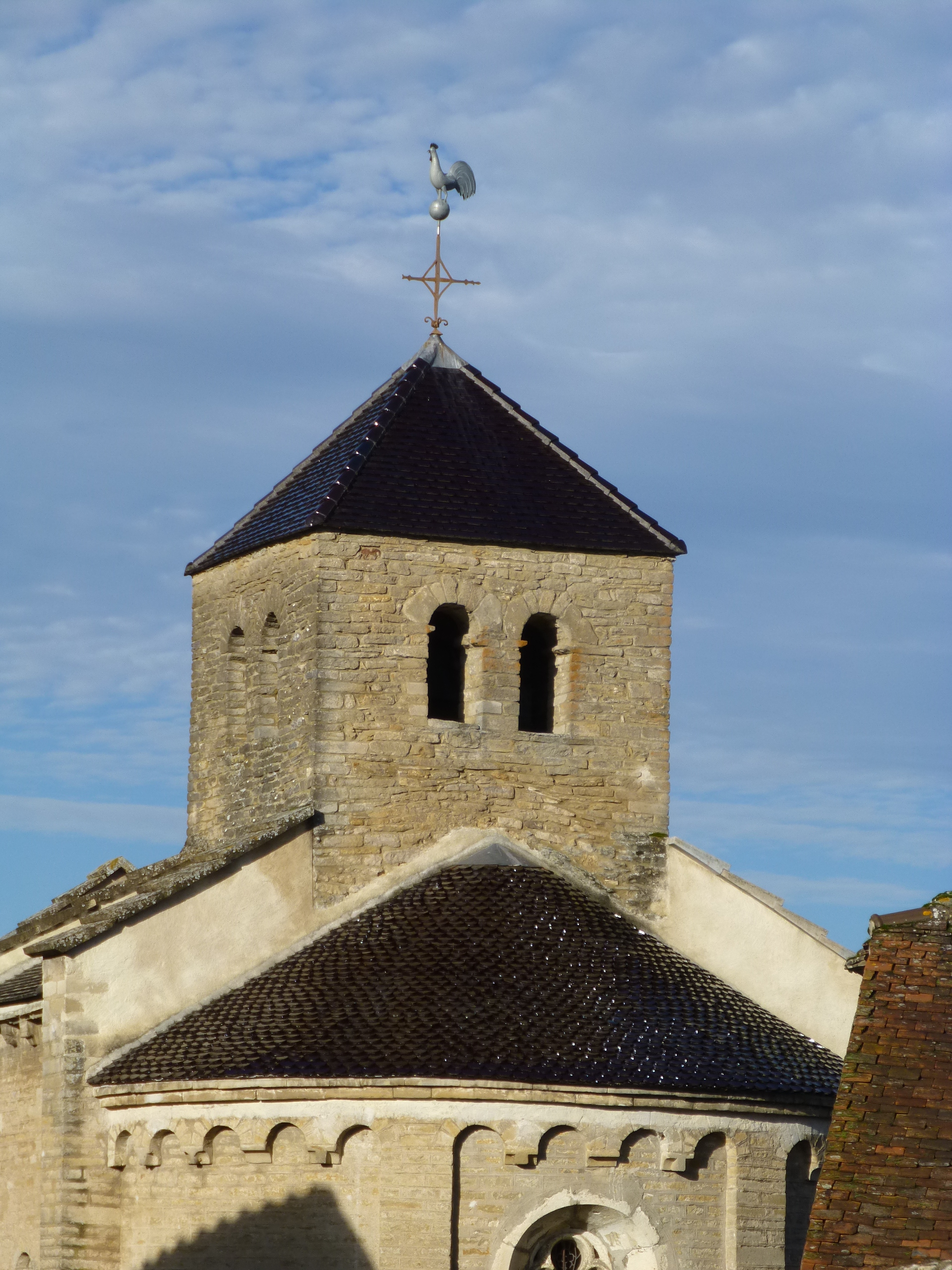
- The Romanesque Church
- Location of Germagny
- Location within France Location within Bourgogne-Franche-Comté
- Coordinates: 46°40′15″N 4°36′11″E
- Country: France
- Region: Bourgogne-Franche-Comté
- Department: Saône-et-Loire
- Arrondissement: Chalon-sur-Saône
- Canton: Givry
- Intercommunality: Sud Côte chalonnaise

Government
  - Mayor (2020–2026): Florent Seve
- Area^{1}: 3.47 km^{2} (1.34 sq mi)
- Elevation: 300 m (980 ft)
- Highest elevation: 358 m (1,175 ft)
- Lowest elevation: 245 m (804 ft)
- Population (2023): 194
  - Density: 55.9/km^{2} (145/sq mi)
- Time zone: UTC+01:00 (CET)
  - Summer (DST): UTC+02:00 (CEST)
- INSEE/Postal code: 71216 /71460
- ^{1} French Land Register data, which excludes lakes, ponds, glaciers > 1 km^{2} (0.386 sq mi or 247 acres) and river estuaries.

Germagny (French pronunciation: [ʒɛʁmaɲi]) is a commune in the Saône-et-Loire department in the region of Bourgogne-Franche-Comté in eastern France.

== Geography ==
The village is located on the Guye river valley. The main roads connect the village to Savianges and Fley to the north, Bissy-sur-Fley to the east, Genouilly to the south and Le Puley to the west.

== Main sights ==
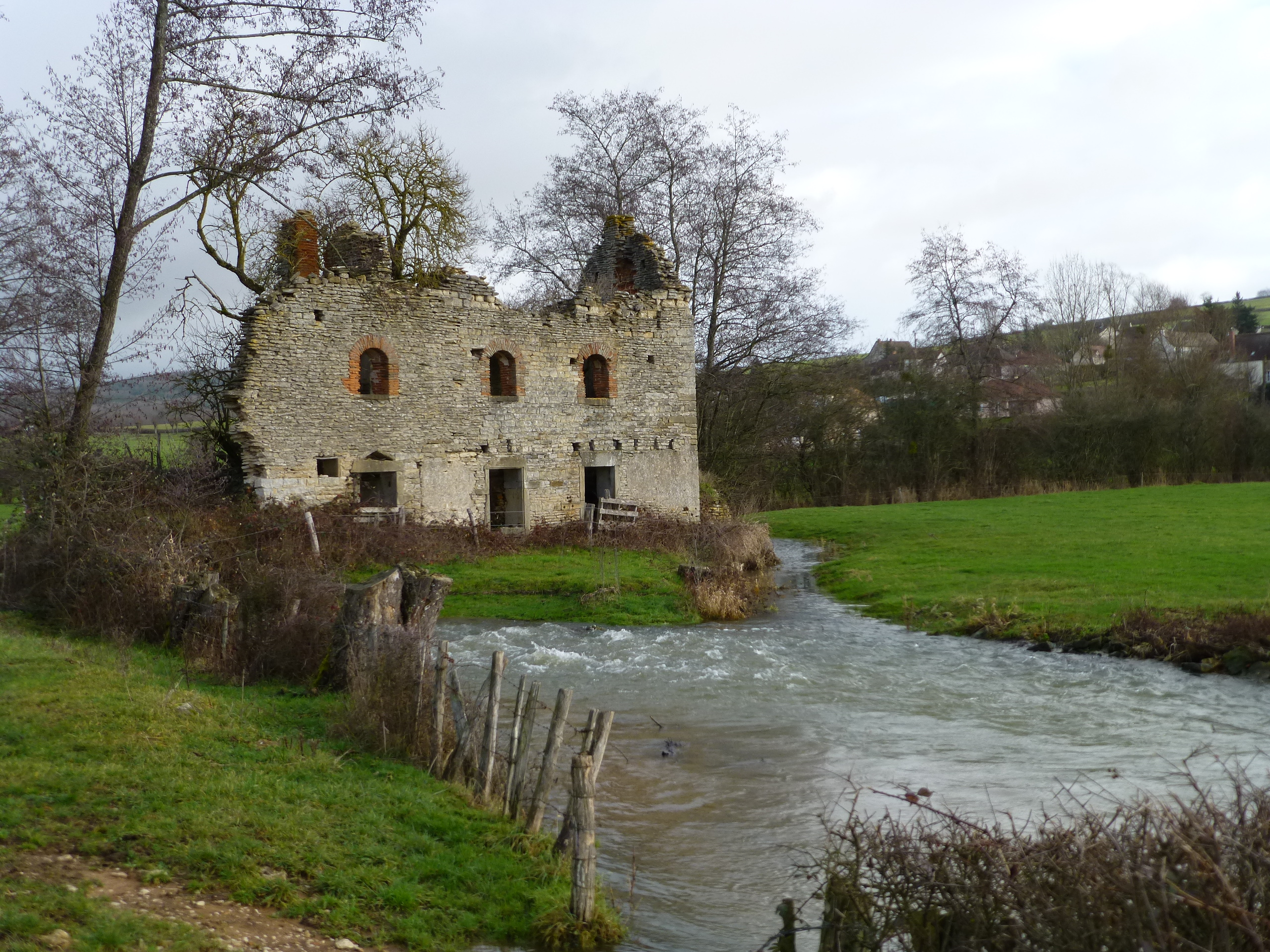
An old mill near the River Guye in Germagny

- The Romanesque church, where a fresco showing a teenage Christ in glory, was discovered in 1983 in the apse.
- The public footpath near the River Guye. It was named "La Pléiade", in memory of Pontus de Tyard and Guillaume des Autels, who used to live in the neighbouring villages.

== See also ==
- Communes of the Saône-et-Loire department
