= Savianges =

- Commune
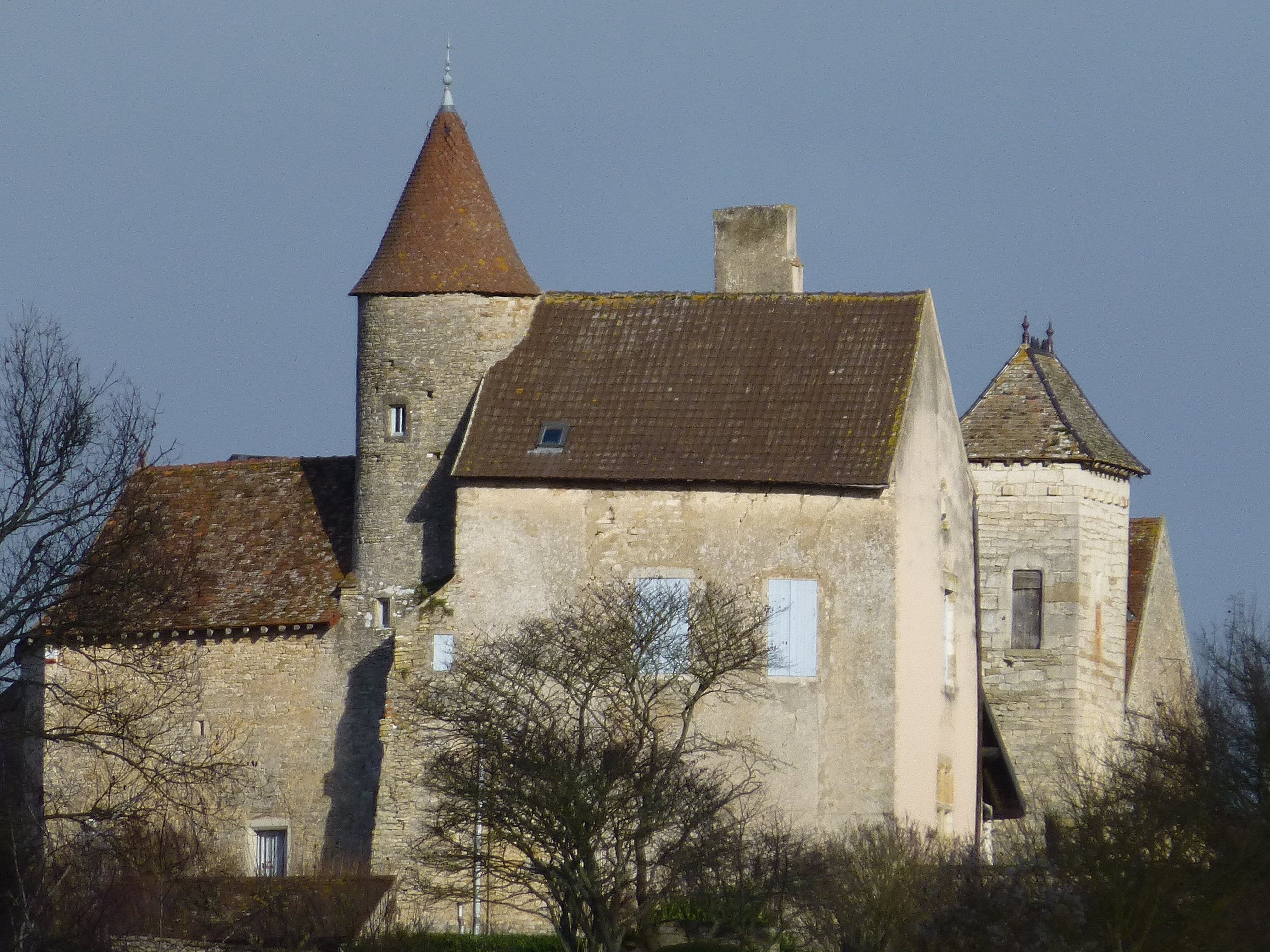
- The Castle of Savianges
- Location of Savianges
- Location within France Location within Bourgogne-Franche-Comté
- Coordinates: 46°41′32″N 4°36′27″E
- Country: France
- Region: Bourgogne-Franche-Comté
- Department: Saône-et-Loire
- Arrondissement: Chalon-sur-Saône
- Canton: Givry
- Area^{1}: 6.56 km^{2} (2.53 sq mi)
- Elevation: 263 m (863 ft)
- Highest elevation: 419 m (1,375 ft)
- Lowest elevation: 252 m (827 ft)
- Population (2023): 80
  - Density: 12/km^{2} (32/sq mi)
- Time zone: UTC+01:00 (CET)
  - Summer (DST): UTC+02:00 (CEST)
- INSEE/Postal code: 71505 /71460
- ^{1} French Land Register data, which excludes lakes, ponds, glaciers > 1 km^{2} (0.386 sq mi or 247 acres) and river estuaries.

Savianges (French pronunciation: [savjɑ̃ʒ]) is a commune in the Saône-et-Loire department in the region of Bourgogne-Franche-Comté in eastern France.

== Geography ==
The landscape is mainly composed of grass pastures and a hill named "Le bois Rougeon" overlooking the village. The river Guye flows through from the north to the south. The main roads are connecting the village to Germagny to the south, Cersot to the north, and Fley to the east.

== History ==
=== Early history ===
Savianges gets its name from Gallo-Roman villa, named "Savianga Villa", its existence has been documented from the year 840. A Roman road joining Autun to Mâcon via Saint-Gengoux, was passing through the land.

=== Recent history ===
Savianges used to have 308 people in 1827, the number fell to 187 in 1901 and 73 in 2009. In 1870, François Dulac was Maire of Savianges and member of French Senate. As an architect, he built several schools and public buildings in Saône-et-Loire. At this period, Savianges had two schools: One public school built by Dulac and one Religious School (named Saint-Louis) build by Miss Julia de La Bussière for the Sisters of the Blessed Sacrament of Autun.

== Main sights ==
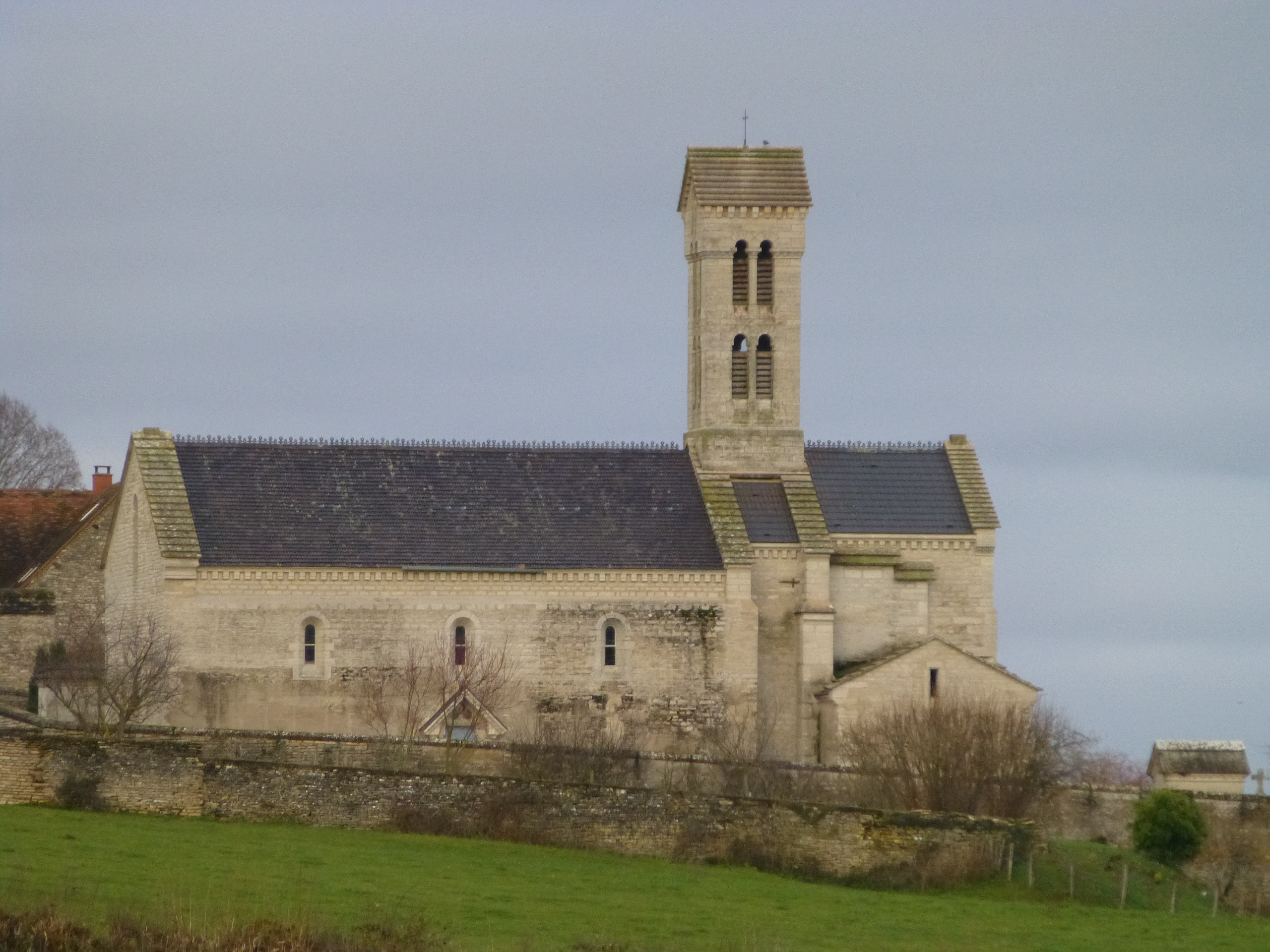
The Church

- Savianges, a Middle Ages castle
- 15th century church modified by Dulac in the 19th century in a neo-renaissance Italian style. The church contains elements protected by French National Heritage as a Monument historique.
- Buildings by François Dulac architect (former public school, former vicarage)
- Wash house

== See also ==
- Communes of the Saône-et-Loire department
