= Saint-Privé =

Saint-Privé may refer to:

- Saint-Privé, Saône-et-Loire, a commune in the French region of Bourgogne
- Saint-Privé, Yonne, a commune in the French region of Bourgogne
