= Saint-Martin-du-Tertre =

Saint-Martin-du-Tertre may refer to the following places in France:

- Saint-Martin-du-Tertre, Yonne, a commune in the Yonne department
- Saint-Martin-du-Tertre, Val-d'Oise, a commune in the Val-d'Oise department

== See also ==
- Saint-Martin-du-Tartre, a commune in the Saône-et-Loire department
