= Granges =

Granges may refer to:

- Monastic granges, farming estates belonging to a monastery
- The National Grange of the Order of Patrons of Husbandry (The Grange), an agricultural organization
- Granges, Saône-et-Loire, a commune in France
- Granges, Switzerland, a municipality of the canton of Fribourg
- Granges-près-Marnand, a municipality of the canton of Fribourg, Switzerland
- Granges-Paccot, a municipality of the canton of Fribourg, Switzerland
- Grenchen (in German, "Granges" in French), a municipality of the canton of Solothurn, Switzerland
- Gränges AB, previously Trafik AB Grängesberg-Oxelösund, a Swedish industrial and mining company

== See also ==
- Grange (disambiguation)
