= Jambles =

- Commune
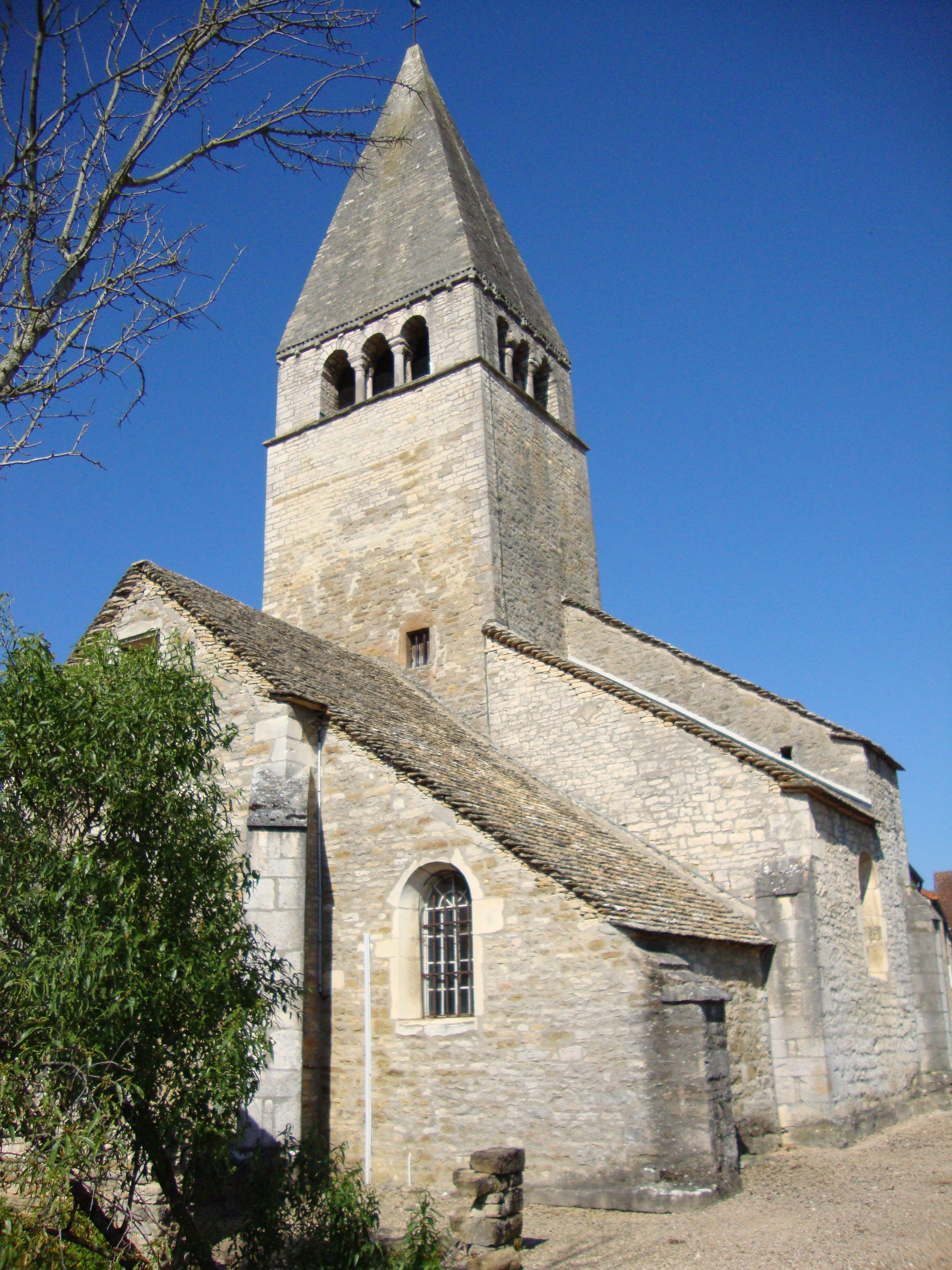
- The church in Jambles
- Location of Jambles
- Location within France Location within Bourgogne-Franche-Comté
- Coordinates: 46°46′29″N 4°41′40″E
- Country: France
- Region: Bourgogne-Franche-Comté
- Department: Saône-et-Loire
- Arrondissement: Chalon-sur-Saône
- Canton: Givry
- Intercommunality: CA Le Grand Chalon

Government
  - Mayor (2020–2026): Luc Bertin-Boussu
- Area^{1}: 8.25 km^{2} (3.19 sq mi)
- Elevation: 270 m (890 ft)
- Highest elevation: 495 m (1,624 ft)
- Lowest elevation: 234 m (768 ft)
- Population (2023): 471
  - Density: 57.1/km^{2} (148/sq mi)
- Time zone: UTC+01:00 (CET)
  - Summer (DST): UTC+02:00 (CEST)
- INSEE/Postal code: 71241 /71640
- ^{1} French Land Register data, which excludes lakes, ponds, glaciers > 1 km^{2} (0.386 sq mi or 247 acres) and river estuaries.

Jambles (French pronunciation: [ʒɑ̃bl]) is a commune in the Saône-et-Loire department in the region of Bourgogne-Franche-Comté in eastern France.

== See also ==
- Communes of the Saône-et-Loire department
