= Bissy-sur-Fley =

- Commune
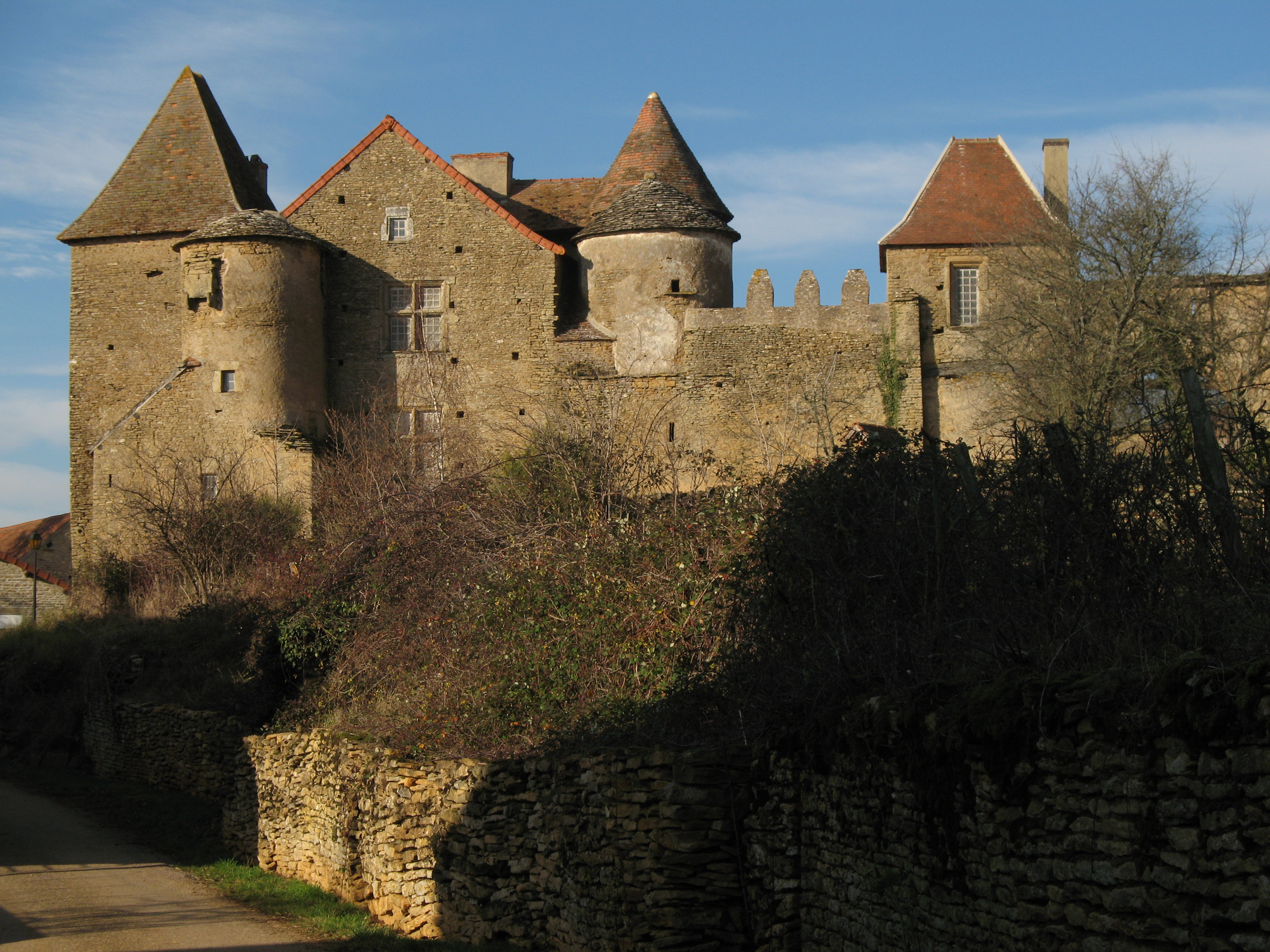
- Chateau
- Location of Bissy-sur-Fley
- Location within France Location within Bourgogne-Franche-Comté
- Coordinates: 46°39′47″N 4°37′16″E
- Country: France
- Region: Bourgogne-Franche-Comté
- Department: Saône-et-Loire
- Arrondissement: Chalon-sur-Saône
- Canton: Givry
- Intercommunality: Sud Côte Chalonnaise

Government
  - Mayor (2020–2026): Christine Rebourgeon
- Area^{1}: 4.8 km^{2} (1.9 sq mi)
- Elevation: 316 m (1,037 ft)
- Highest elevation: 406 m (1,332 ft)
- Lowest elevation: 274 m (899 ft)
- Population (2023): 85
  - Density: 18/km^{2} (46/sq mi)
- Time zone: UTC+01:00 (CET)
  - Summer (DST): UTC+02:00 (CEST)
- INSEE/Postal code: 71037 /71460
- ^{1} French Land Register data, which excludes lakes, ponds, glaciers > 1 km^{2} (0.386 sq mi or 247 acres) and river estuaries.

Bissy-sur-Fley (French pronunciation: [bisi syʁ flɛ], literally Bissy on Fley) is a commune in the Saône-et-Loire department in the region of Bourgogne-Franche-Comté in eastern France.

== Population ==
Historical population
Year	Pop.	±% p.a.
1968	129	—
1975	93	−4.57%
1982	77	−2.66%
1990	71	−1.01%
1999	72	+0.16%
2007	95	+3.53%
2012	100	+1.03%
2017	89	−2.30%
2023	85	−0.76%
Source: INSEE

== Sights ==
- 15th-century castle known for its owner Pontus de Tyard a French poet member of La Pléiade. The castle has been protected as a historic site since 1932.

== See also ==
- Communes of the Saône-et-Loire department
