= Saint-Germain-lès-Buxy =

- Commune
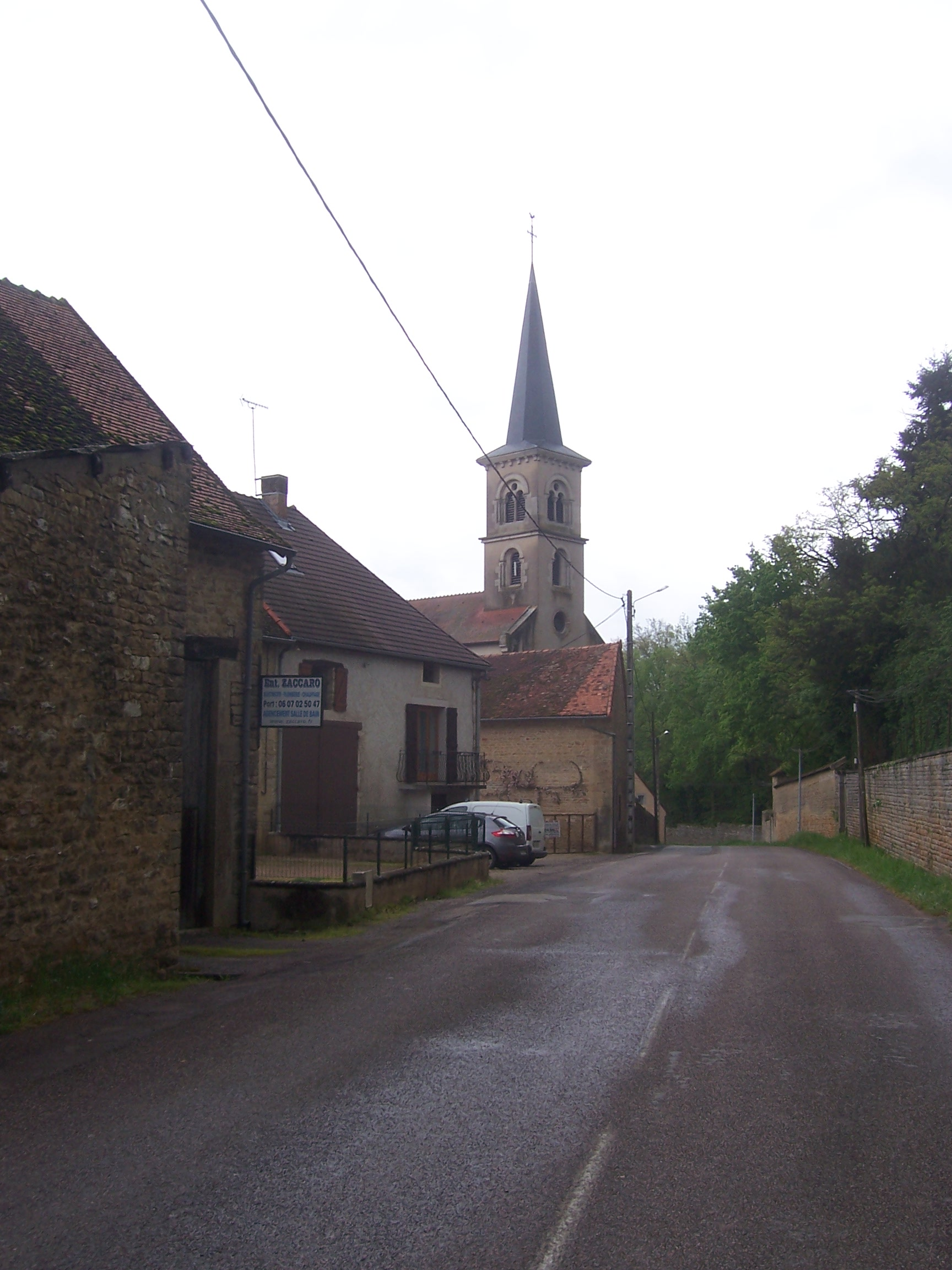
- The church and surroundings in Saint-Germain-lès-Buxy
- Location of Saint-Germain-lès-Buxy
- Location within France Location within Bourgogne-Franche-Comté
- Coordinates: 46°42′41″N 4°46′21″E
- Country: France
- Region: Bourgogne-Franche-Comté
- Department: Saône-et-Loire
- Arrondissement: Chalon-sur-Saône
- Canton: Givry
- Area^{1}: 13.42 km^{2} (5.18 sq mi)
- Elevation: 206 m (676 ft)
- Highest elevation: 224 m (735 ft)
- Lowest elevation: 183 m (600 ft)
- Population (2023): 260
  - Density: 19/km^{2} (50/sq mi)
- Time zone: UTC+01:00 (CET)
  - Summer (DST): UTC+02:00 (CEST)
- INSEE/Postal code: 71422 /71390
- ^{1} French Land Register data, which excludes lakes, ponds, glaciers > 1 km^{2} (0.386 sq mi or 247 acres) and river estuaries.

Saint-Germain-lès-Buxy (French pronunciation: [sɛ̃ ʒɛʁmɛ̃ lɛ byksi], literally Saint-Germain near Buxy) is a commune in the Saône-et-Loire department in the region of Bourgogne-Franche-Comté in eastern France.

== See also ==
- Communes of the Saône-et-Loire department
