= Saint-Maurice-des-Champs =

- Commune
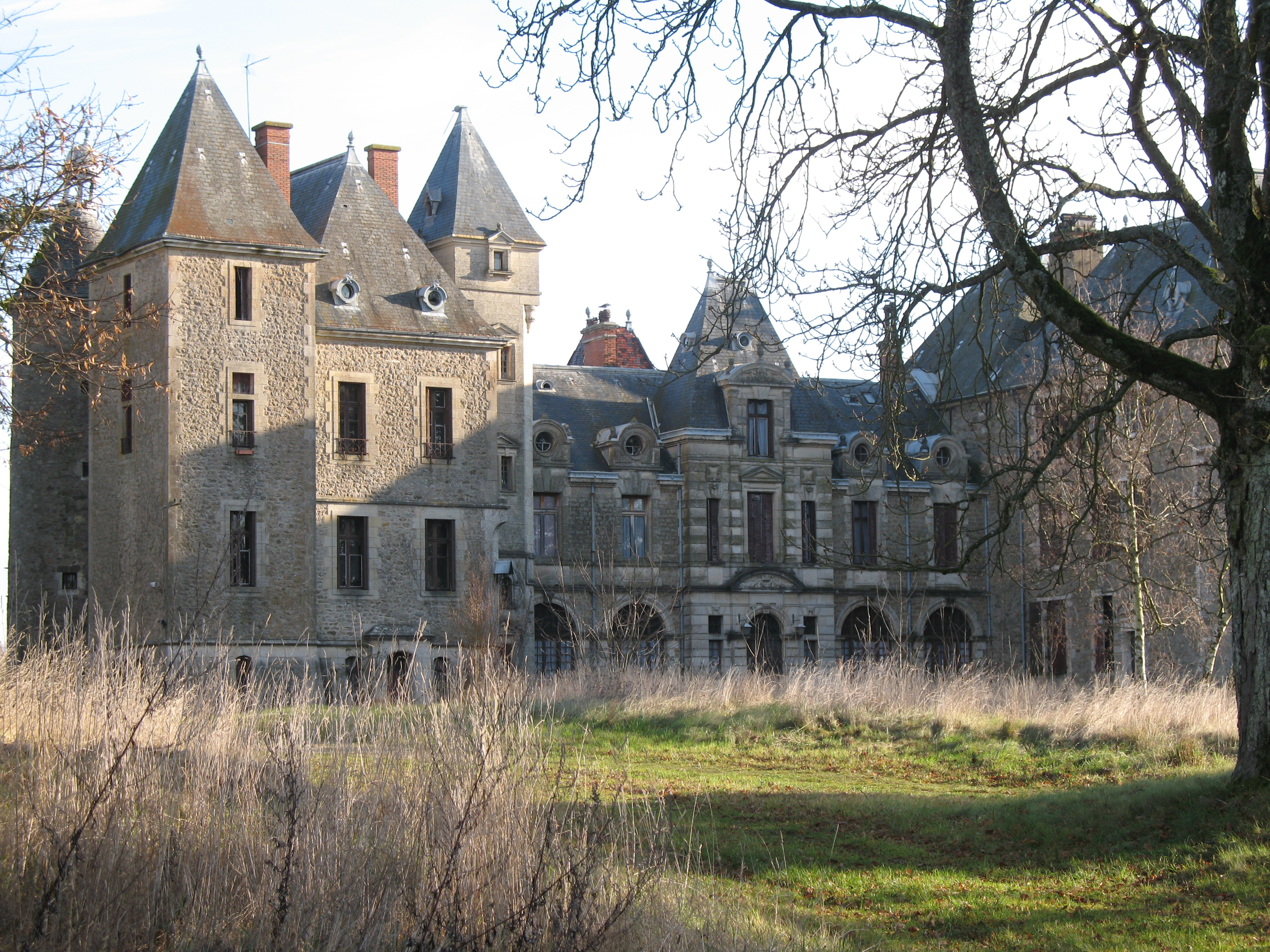
- Château de la Rochette
- Location of Saint-Maurice-des-Champs
- Location within France Location within Bourgogne-Franche-Comté
- Coordinates: 46°37′46″N 4°37′12″E
- Country: France
- Region: Bourgogne-Franche-Comté
- Department: Saône-et-Loire
- Arrondissement: Chalon-sur-Saône
- Canton: Givry
- Area^{1}: 5.83 km^{2} (2.25 sq mi)
- Elevation: 400 m (1,300 ft)
- Highest elevation: 408 m (1,339 ft)
- Lowest elevation: 275 m (902 ft)
- Population (2023): 61
  - Density: 10/km^{2} (27/sq mi)
- Time zone: UTC+01:00 (CET)
  - Summer (DST): UTC+02:00 (CEST)
- INSEE/Postal code: 71461 /71460
- ^{1} French Land Register data, which excludes lakes, ponds, glaciers > 1 km^{2} (0.386 sq mi or 247 acres) and river estuaries.

Saint-Maurice-des-Champs (French pronunciation: [sɛ̃ mɔʁis de ʃɑ̃]) is a commune in the Saône-et-Loire department in the region of Bourgogne-Franche-Comté in eastern France.

== See also ==
- Communes of the Saône-et-Loire department
