= Rosey, Saône-et-Loire =

Rosey
- Commune
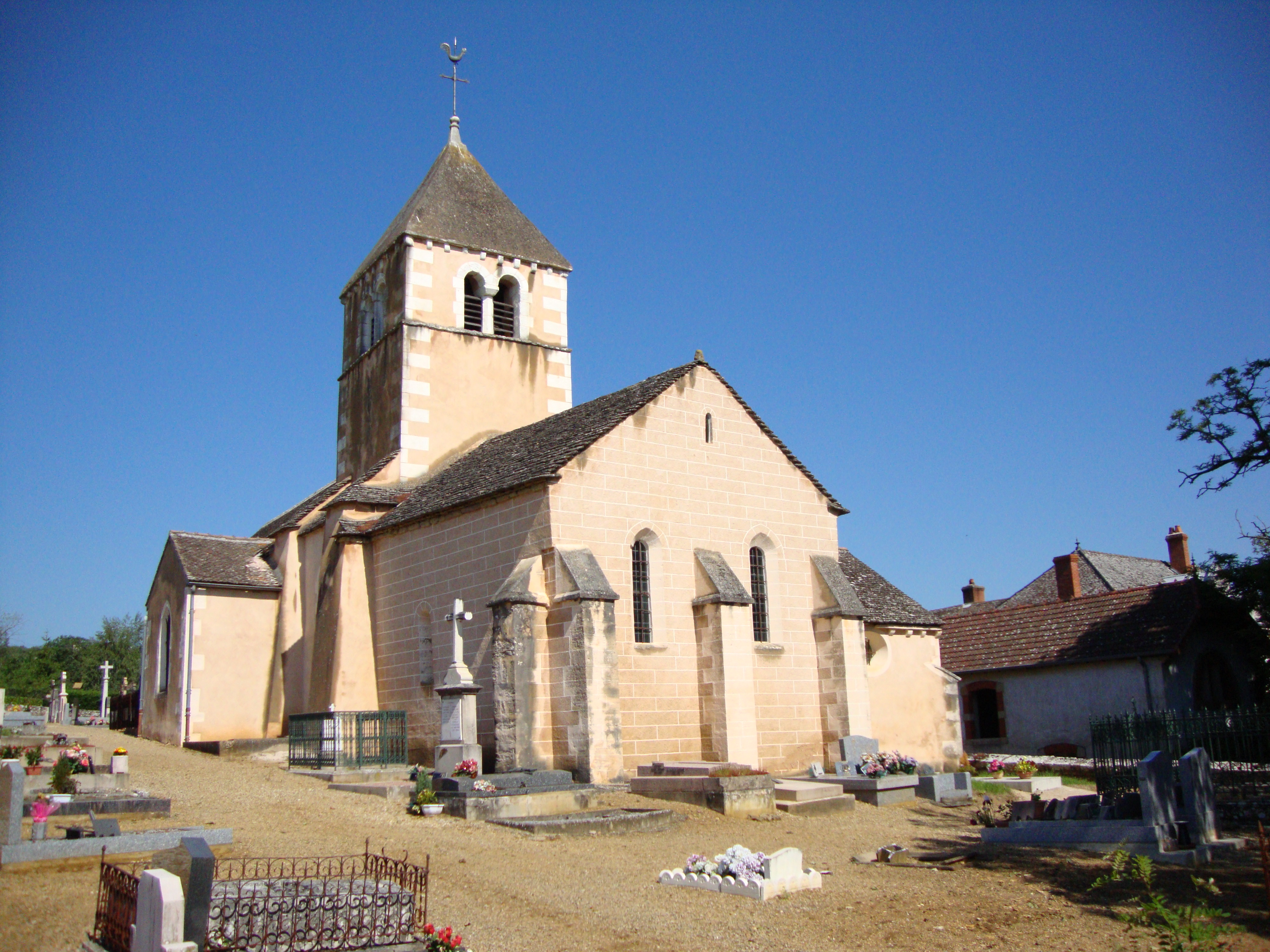
- The church in Rosey

- Coat of arms
- Location of Rosey
- Location within France Location within Bourgogne-Franche-Comté
- Coordinates: 46°44′48″N 4°42′24″E
- Country: France
- Region: Bourgogne-Franche-Comté
- Department: Saône-et-Loire
- Arrondissement: Chalon-sur-Saône
- Canton: Givry
- Intercommunality: Sud Côte Chalonnaise

Government
  - Mayor (2020–2026): Philippe Desbois
- Area^{1}: 4.24 km^{2} (1.64 sq mi)
- Elevation: 250 m (820 ft)
- Highest elevation: 335 m (1,099 ft)
- Lowest elevation: 193 m (633 ft)
- Population (2023): 156
  - Density: 36.8/km^{2} (95.3/sq mi)
- Time zone: UTC+01:00 (CET)
  - Summer (DST): UTC+02:00 (CEST)
- INSEE/Postal code: 71374 /71390
- ^{1} French Land Register data, which excludes lakes, ponds, glaciers > 1 km^{2} (0.386 sq mi or 247 acres) and river estuaries.

Rosey (French pronunciation: [ʁozɛ]) is a commune in the Saône-et-Loire department in the region of Bourgogne-Franche-Comté in eastern France.

== See also ==
- Communes of the Saône-et-Loire department
