= Chenôves =

- Commune
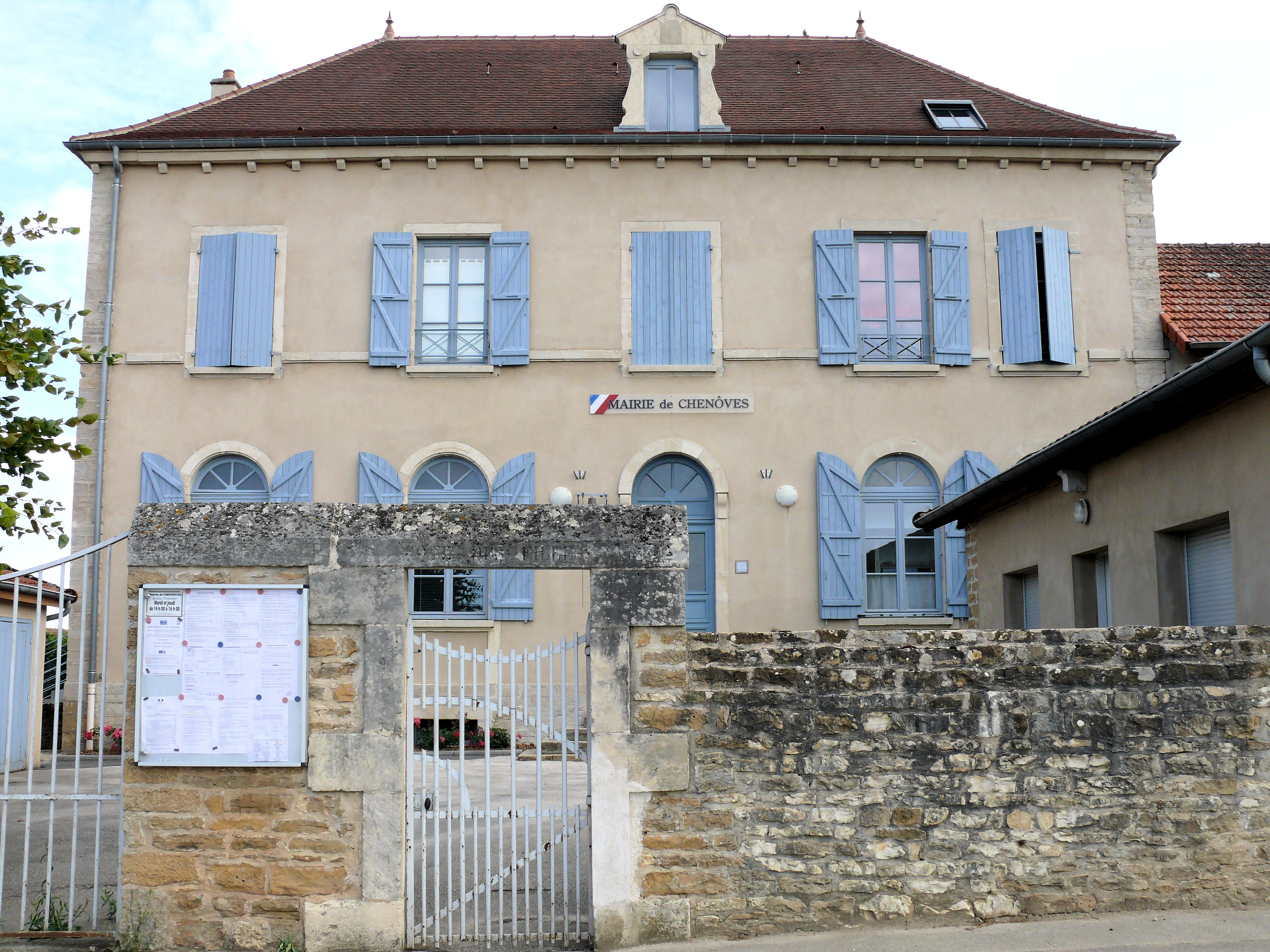
- The town hall in Chenôves
- Location of Chenôves
- Location within France Location within Bourgogne-Franche-Comté
- Coordinates: 46°40′17″N 4°40′18″E
- Country: France
- Region: Bourgogne-Franche-Comté
- Department: Saône-et-Loire
- Arrondissement: Chalon-sur-Saône
- Canton: Givry
- Intercommunality: Sud Côte Chalonnaise
- Area^{1}: 10.54 km^{2} (4.07 sq mi)
- Elevation: 314 m (1,030 ft)
- Highest elevation: 439 m (1,440 ft)
- Lowest elevation: 194 m (636 ft)
- Population (2023): 211
  - Density: 20.0/km^{2} (51.8/sq mi)
- Time zone: UTC+01:00 (CET)
  - Summer (DST): UTC+02:00 (CEST)
- INSEE/Postal code: 71124 /71390
- ^{1} French Land Register data, which excludes lakes, ponds, glaciers > 1 km^{2} (0.386 sq mi or 247 acres) and river estuaries.

Chenôves (French pronunciation: [ʃənov]) is a commune in the Saône-et-Loire department in the region of Bourgogne-Franche-Comté in eastern France.

== See also ==
- Communes of the Saône-et-Loire department
