= Saint-Denis-de-Vaux =

- Commune
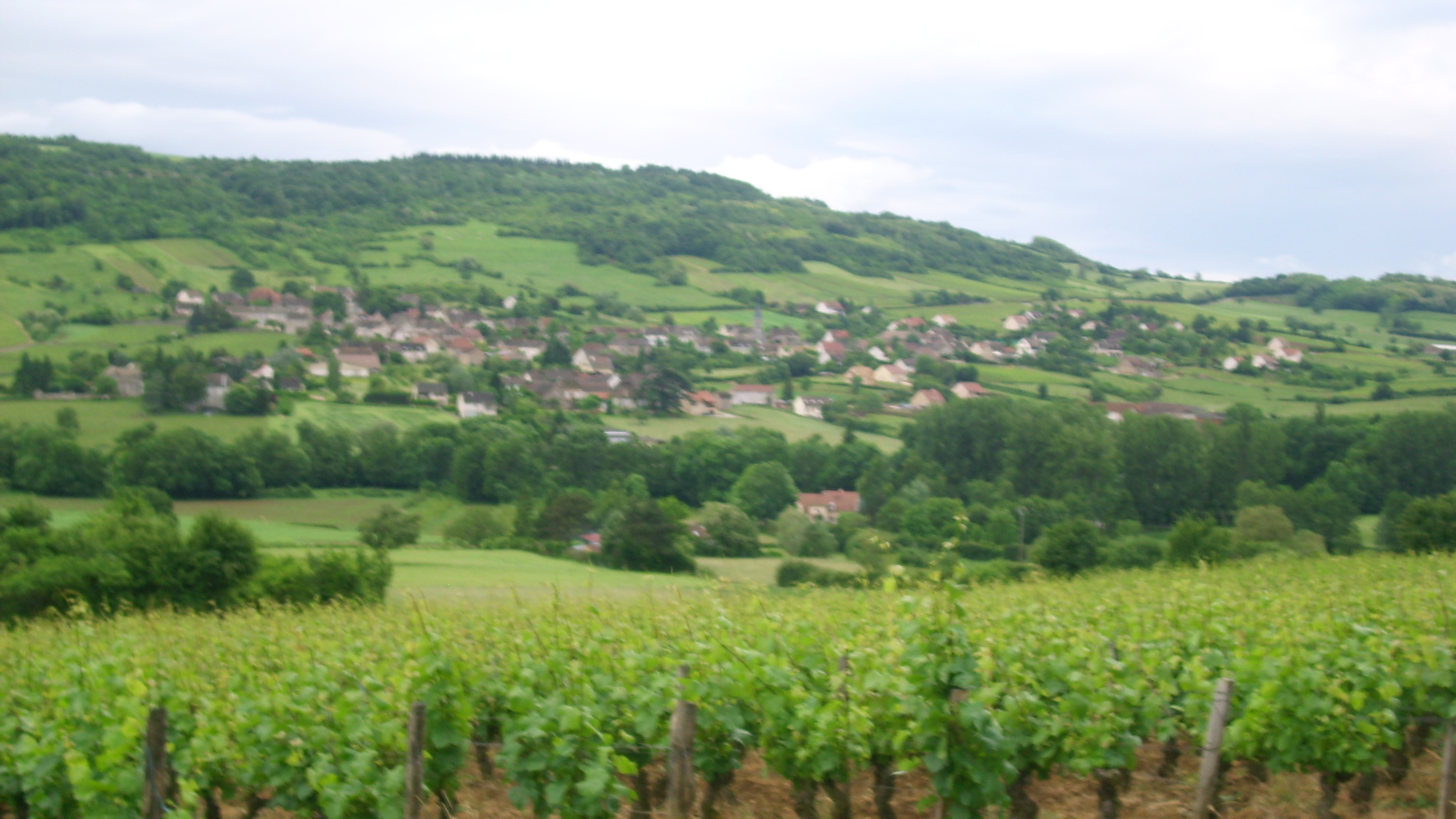
- A general view of Saint-Denis-de-Vaux

- Coat of arms
- Location of Saint-Denis-de-Vaux
- Location within France Location within Bourgogne-Franche-Comté
- Coordinates: 46°47′47″N 4°41′54″E
- Country: France
- Region: Bourgogne-Franche-Comté
- Department: Saône-et-Loire
- Arrondissement: Chalon-sur-Saône
- Canton: Givry
- Intercommunality: CA Le Grand Chalon

Government
  - Mayor (2020–2026): Fabienne Saint-Arroman
- Area^{1}: 3.71 km^{2} (1.43 sq mi)
- Elevation: 340 m (1,120 ft)
- Highest elevation: 431 m (1,414 ft)
- Lowest elevation: 230 m (750 ft)
- Population (2023): 275
  - Density: 74.1/km^{2} (192/sq mi)
- Time zone: UTC+01:00 (CET)
  - Summer (DST): UTC+02:00 (CEST)
- INSEE/Postal code: 71403 /71640
- ^{1} French Land Register data, which excludes lakes, ponds, glaciers > 1 km^{2} (0.386 sq mi or 247 acres) and river estuaries.

Saint-Denis-de-Vaux (French pronunciation: [sɛ̃ dəni də vo]) is a commune in the Saône-et-Loire department in the region of Bourgogne-Franche-Comté in eastern France.

== See also ==
- Communes of the Saône-et-Loire department
