= Santilly, Saône-et-Loire =

Santilly
- Commune
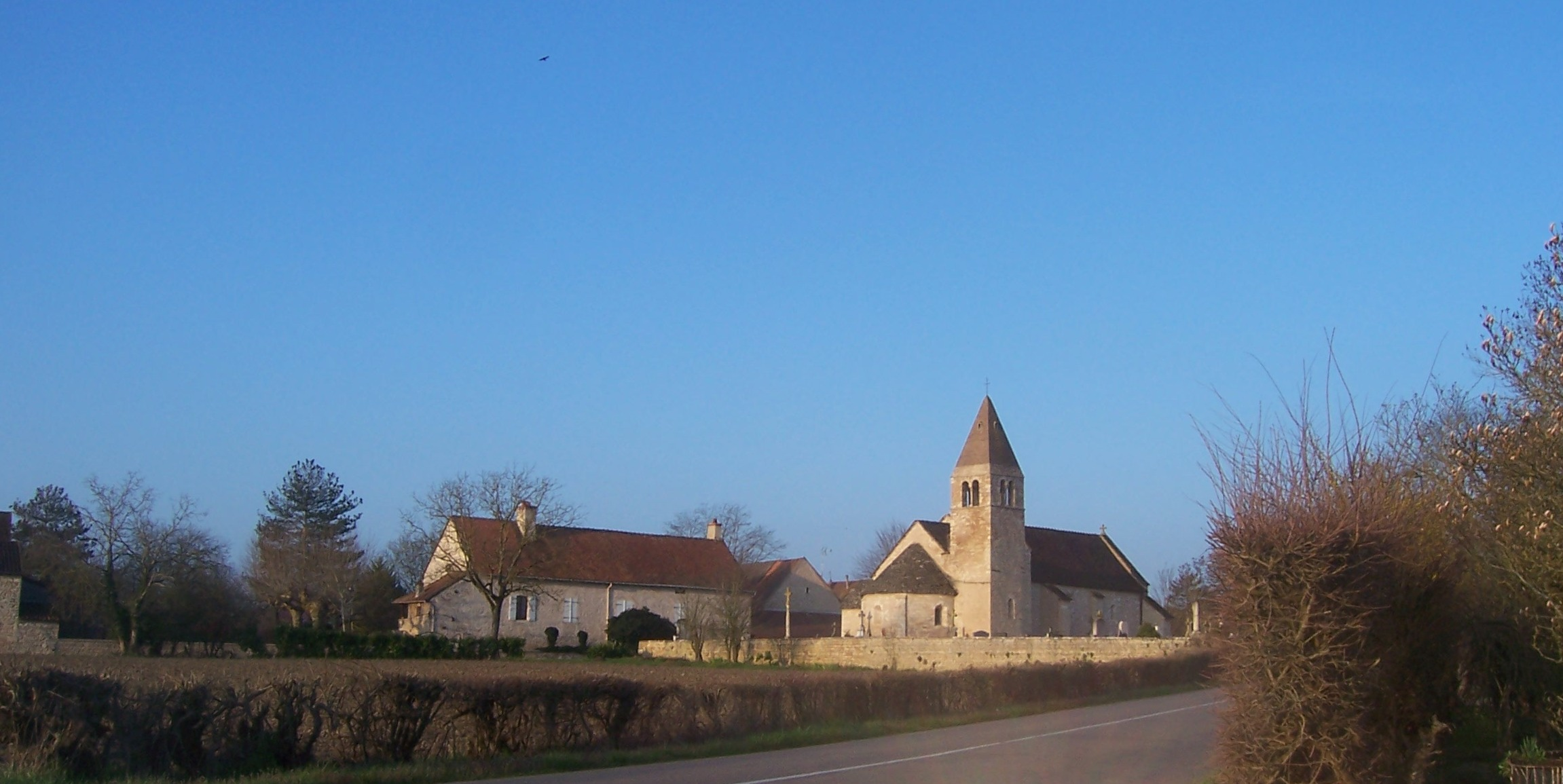
- The church in Santilly
- Location of Santilly
- Location within France Location within Bourgogne-Franche-Comté
- Coordinates: 46°36′56″N 4°41′44″E
- Country: France
- Region: Bourgogne-Franche-Comté
- Department: Saône-et-Loire
- Arrondissement: Chalon-sur-Saône
- Canton: Givry
- Area^{1}: 7.22 km^{2} (2.79 sq mi)
- Elevation: 190 m (620 ft)
- Highest elevation: 295 m (968 ft)
- Lowest elevation: 187 m (614 ft)
- Population (2023): 156
  - Density: 21.6/km^{2} (56.0/sq mi)
- Time zone: UTC+01:00 (CET)
  - Summer (DST): UTC+02:00 (CEST)
- INSEE/Postal code: 71498 /71460
- ^{1} French Land Register data, which excludes lakes, ponds, glaciers > 1 km^{2} (0.386 sq mi or 247 acres) and river estuaries.

Santilly is a commune in the Saône-et-Loire department in the region of Bourgogne-Franche-Comté in eastern France.

== See also ==
- Communes of the Saône-et-Loire department
