= Saint-Mard-de-Vaux =

- Commune
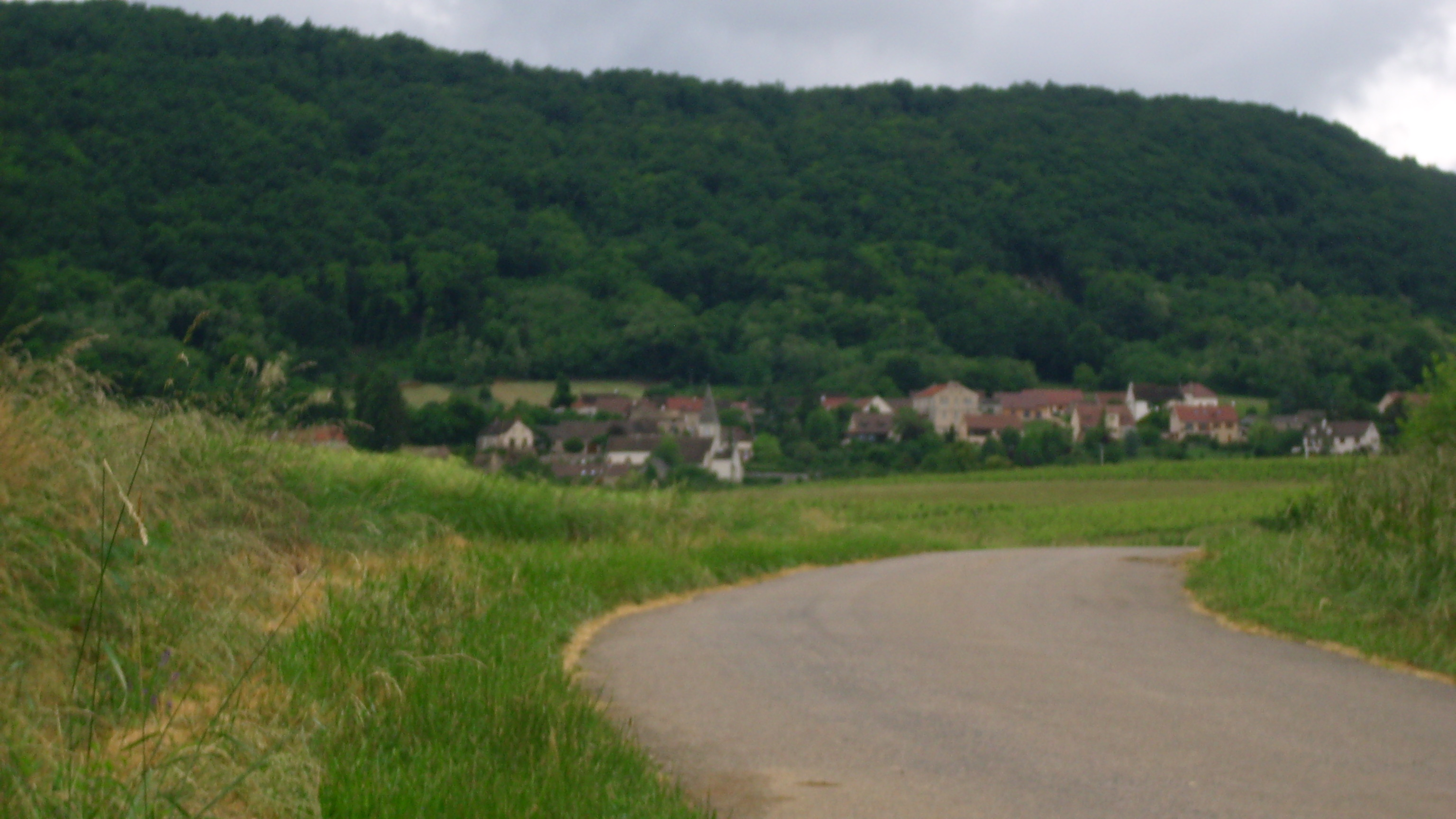
- A general view of Saint-Mard-de-Vaux

- Coat of arms
- Location of Saint-Mard-de-Vaux
- Location within France Location within Bourgogne-Franche-Comté
- Coordinates: 46°48′46″N 4°41′05″E
- Country: France
- Region: Bourgogne-Franche-Comté
- Department: Saône-et-Loire
- Arrondissement: Chalon-sur-Saône
- Canton: Givry
- Intercommunality: CA Le Grand Chalon
- Area^{1}: 6.63 km^{2} (2.56 sq mi)
- Elevation: 375 m (1,230 ft)
- Highest elevation: 502 m (1,647 ft)
- Lowest elevation: 249 m (817 ft)
- Population (2023): 264
  - Density: 39.8/km^{2} (103/sq mi)
- Time zone: UTC+01:00 (CET)
  - Summer (DST): UTC+02:00 (CEST)
- INSEE/Postal code: 71447 /71640
- ^{1} French Land Register data, which excludes lakes, ponds, glaciers > 1 km^{2} (0.386 sq mi or 247 acres) and river estuaries.

Saint-Mard-de-Vaux (French pronunciation: [sɛ̃ maʁ də vo]) is a commune in the Saône-et-Loire department in the region of Bourgogne-Franche-Comté in eastern France.

== See also ==
- Communes of the Saône-et-Loire department
