= Barizey =

- Commune
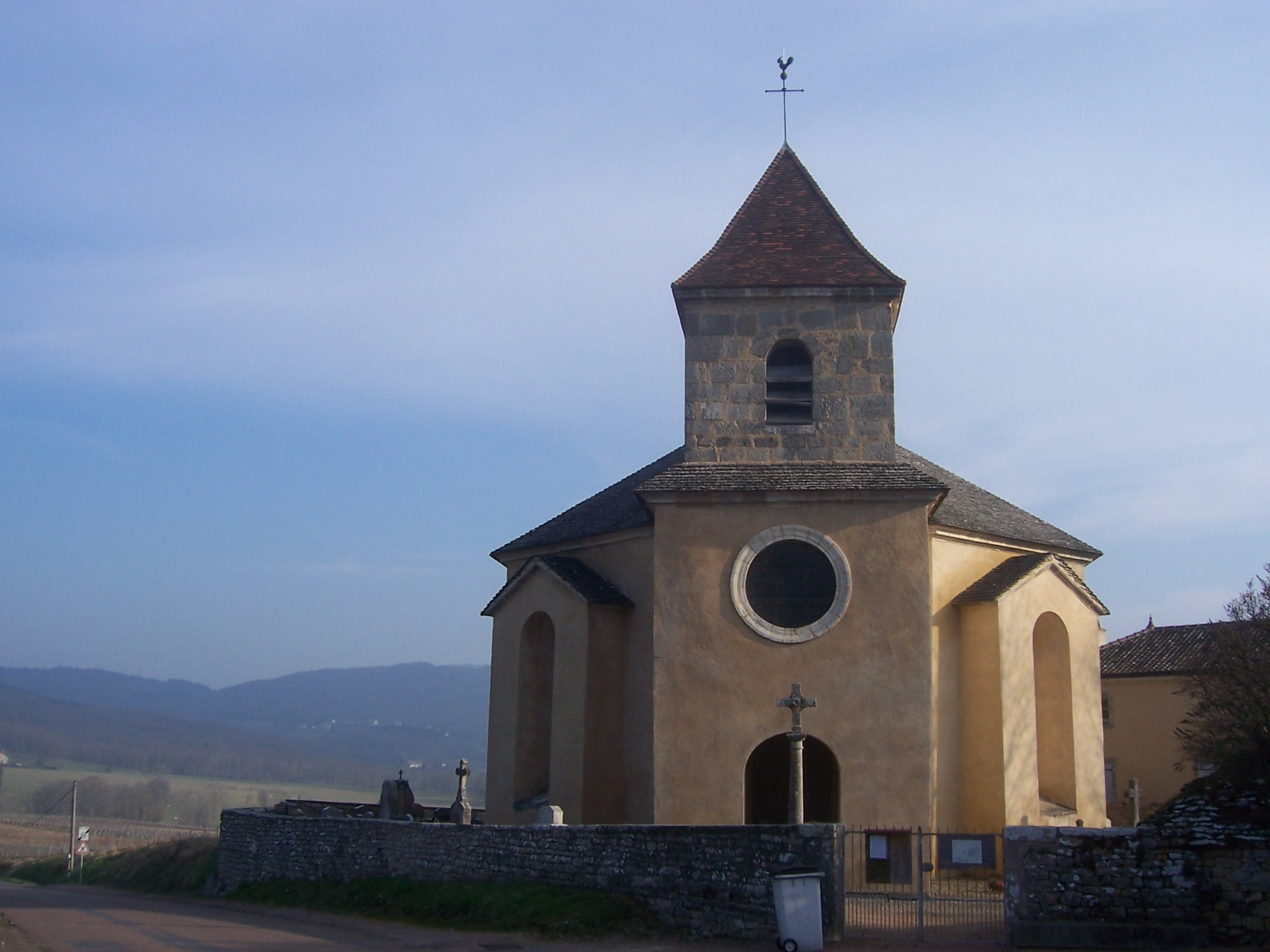
- Location of Barizey
- Location within France Location within Bourgogne-Franche-Comté
- Coordinates: 46°47′22″N 4°40′46″E
- Country: France
- Region: Bourgogne-Franche-Comté
- Department: Saône-et-Loire
- Arrondissement: Chalon-sur-Saône
- Canton: Givry
- Intercommunality: CA Le Grand Chalon

Government
  - Mayor (2020–2026): Dominique Garrey
- Area^{1}: 5.58 km^{2} (2.15 sq mi)
- Elevation: 300 m (980 ft)
- Highest elevation: 465 m (1,526 ft)
- Lowest elevation: 234 m (768 ft)
- Population (2023): 139
  - Density: 24.9/km^{2} (64.5/sq mi)
- Time zone: UTC+01:00 (CET)
  - Summer (DST): UTC+02:00 (CEST)
- INSEE/Postal code: 71019 /71640
- ^{1} French Land Register data, which excludes lakes, ponds, glaciers > 1 km^{2} (0.386 sq mi or 247 acres) and river estuaries.

Barizey (French pronunciation: [baʁizɛ]) is a commune in the Saône-et-Loire department in the region of Bourgogne-Franche-Comté in eastern France.

== Population ==
Historical population
Year	Pop.	±% p.a.
1968	158	—
1975	127	−3.07%
1982	115	−1.41%
1990	139	+2.40%
1999	128	−0.91%
2007	130	+0.19%
2012	132	+0.31%
2017	144	+1.76%
2023	139	−0.59%
Source: INSEE

== See also ==
- Communes of the Saône-et-Loire department
