= Saint-Boil =

- Commune
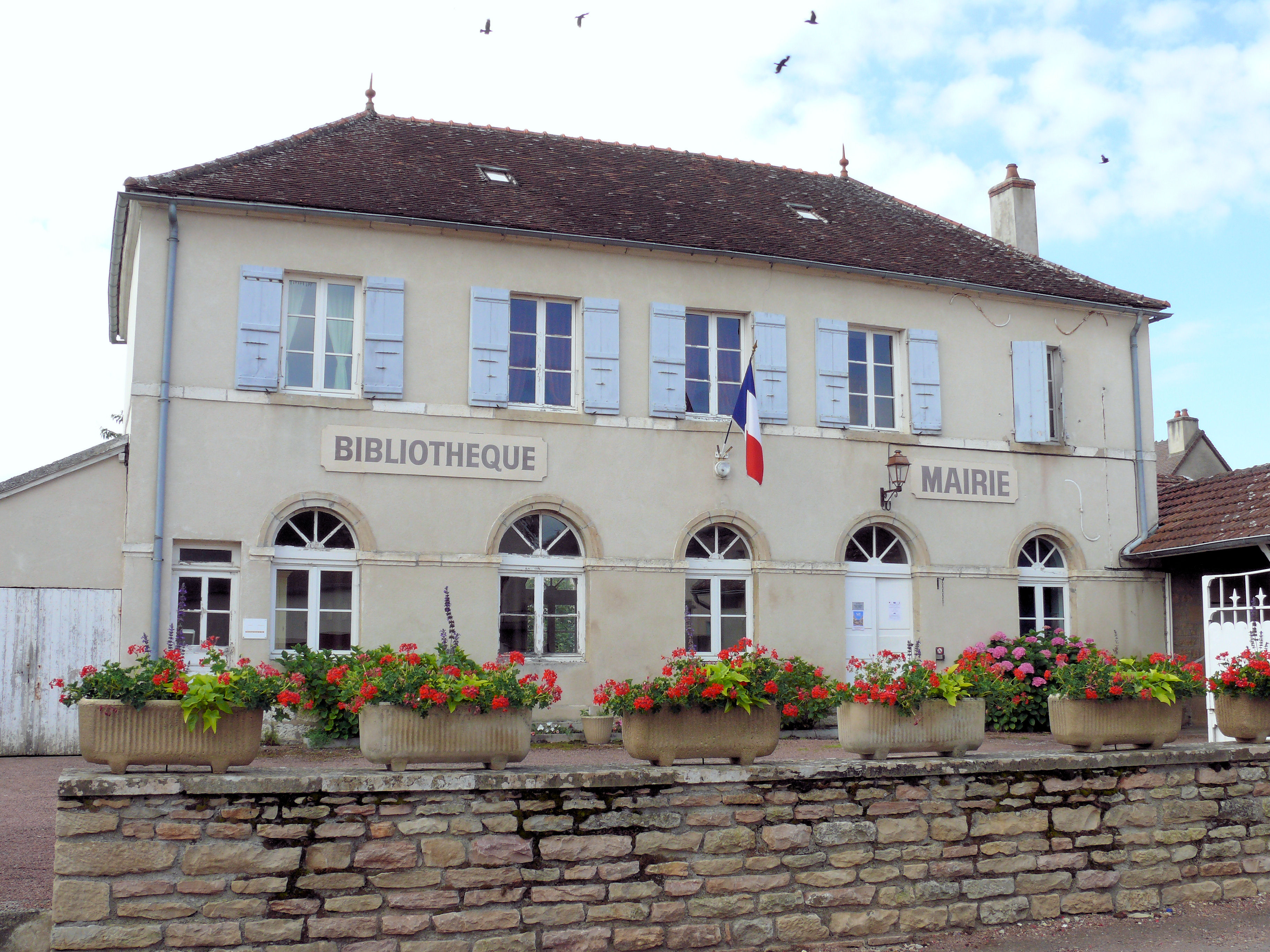
- The town hall in Saint-Boil
- Location of Saint-Boil
- Location within France Location within Bourgogne-Franche-Comté
- Coordinates: 46°39′22″N 4°41′05″E
- Country: France
- Region: Bourgogne-Franche-Comté
- Department: Saône-et-Loire
- Arrondissement: Chalon-sur-Saône
- Canton: Givry
- Area^{1}: 11.66 km^{2} (4.50 sq mi)
- Elevation: 228 m (748 ft)
- Highest elevation: 366 m (1,201 ft)
- Lowest elevation: 193 m (633 ft)
- Population (2023): 491
  - Density: 42.1/km^{2} (109/sq mi)
- Time zone: UTC+01:00 (CET)
  - Summer (DST): UTC+02:00 (CEST)
- INSEE/Postal code: 71392 /71390
- ^{1} French Land Register data, which excludes lakes, ponds, glaciers > 1 km^{2} (0.386 sq mi or 247 acres) and river estuaries.

Saint-Boil is a commune in the Saône-et-Loire department in the region of Bourgogne-Franche-Comté in eastern France.

== See also ==
- Communes of the Saône-et-Loire department
