= Saint-Jean-de-Vaux =

- Commune
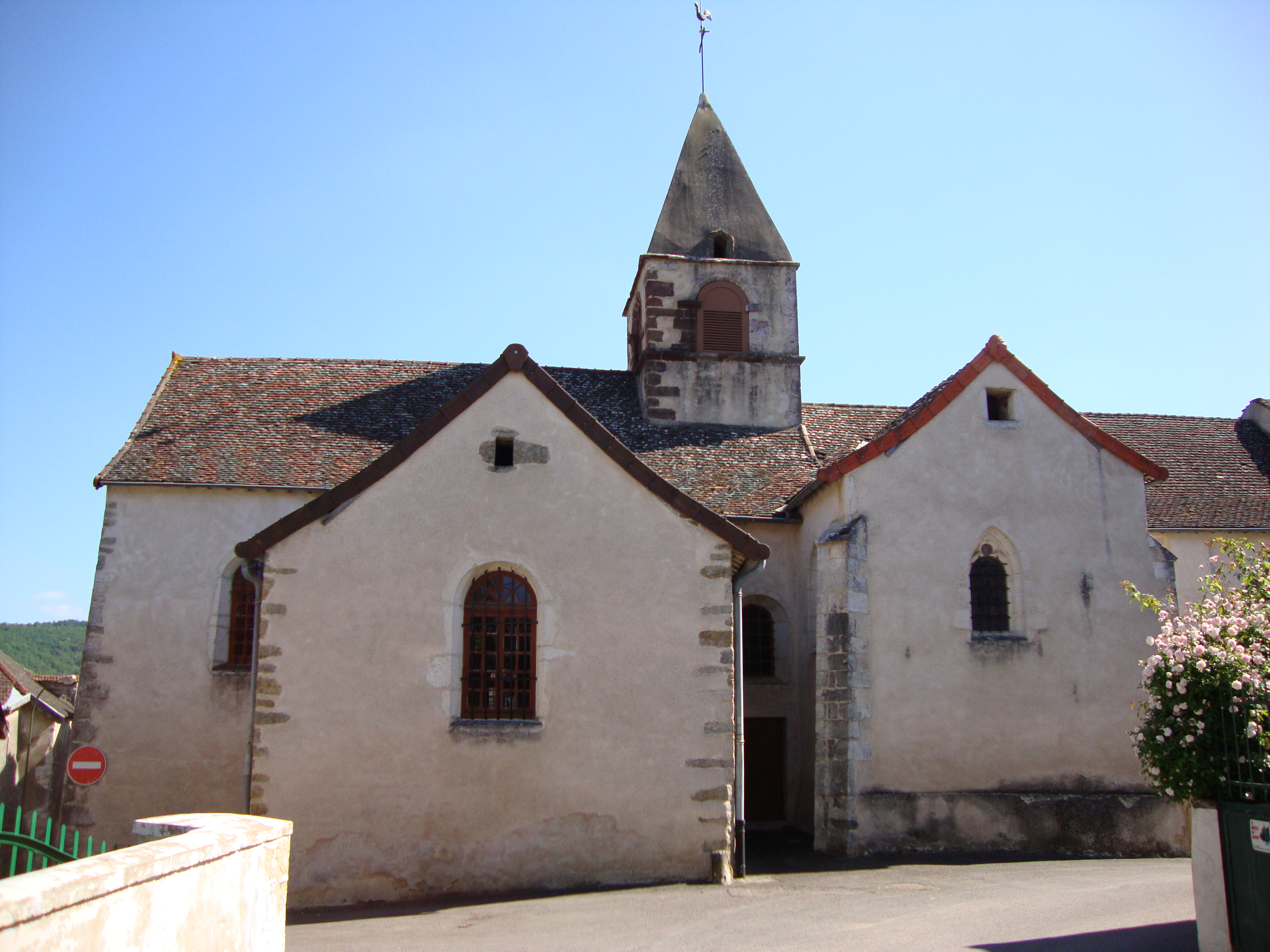
- The church in Saint-Jean-de-Vaux

- Coat of arms
- Location of Saint-Jean-de-Vaux
- Location within France Location within Bourgogne-Franche-Comté
- Coordinates: 46°48′33″N 4°42′02″E
- Country: France
- Region: Bourgogne-Franche-Comté
- Department: Saône-et-Loire
- Arrondissement: Chalon-sur-Saône
- Canton: Givry
- Intercommunality: CA Le Grand Chalon

Government
  - Mayor (2020–2026): Michel Isaie
- Area^{1}: 2.26 km^{2} (0.87 sq mi)
- Elevation: 251 m (823 ft)
- Highest elevation: 325 m (1,066 ft)
- Lowest elevation: 221 m (725 ft)
- Population (2023): 387
  - Density: 171/km^{2} (444/sq mi)
- Time zone: UTC+01:00 (CET)
  - Summer (DST): UTC+02:00 (CEST)
- INSEE/Postal code: 71430 /71640
- ^{1} French Land Register data, which excludes lakes, ponds, glaciers > 1 km^{2} (0.386 sq mi or 247 acres) and river estuaries.

Saint-Jean-de-Vaux (French pronunciation: [sɛ̃ ʒɑ̃ də vo]) is a commune in the Saône-et-Loire department in the region of Bourgogne-Franche-Comté in eastern France.

== See also ==
- Communes of the Saône-et-Loire department
