= Saules, Saône-et-Loire =

Saules
- Commune
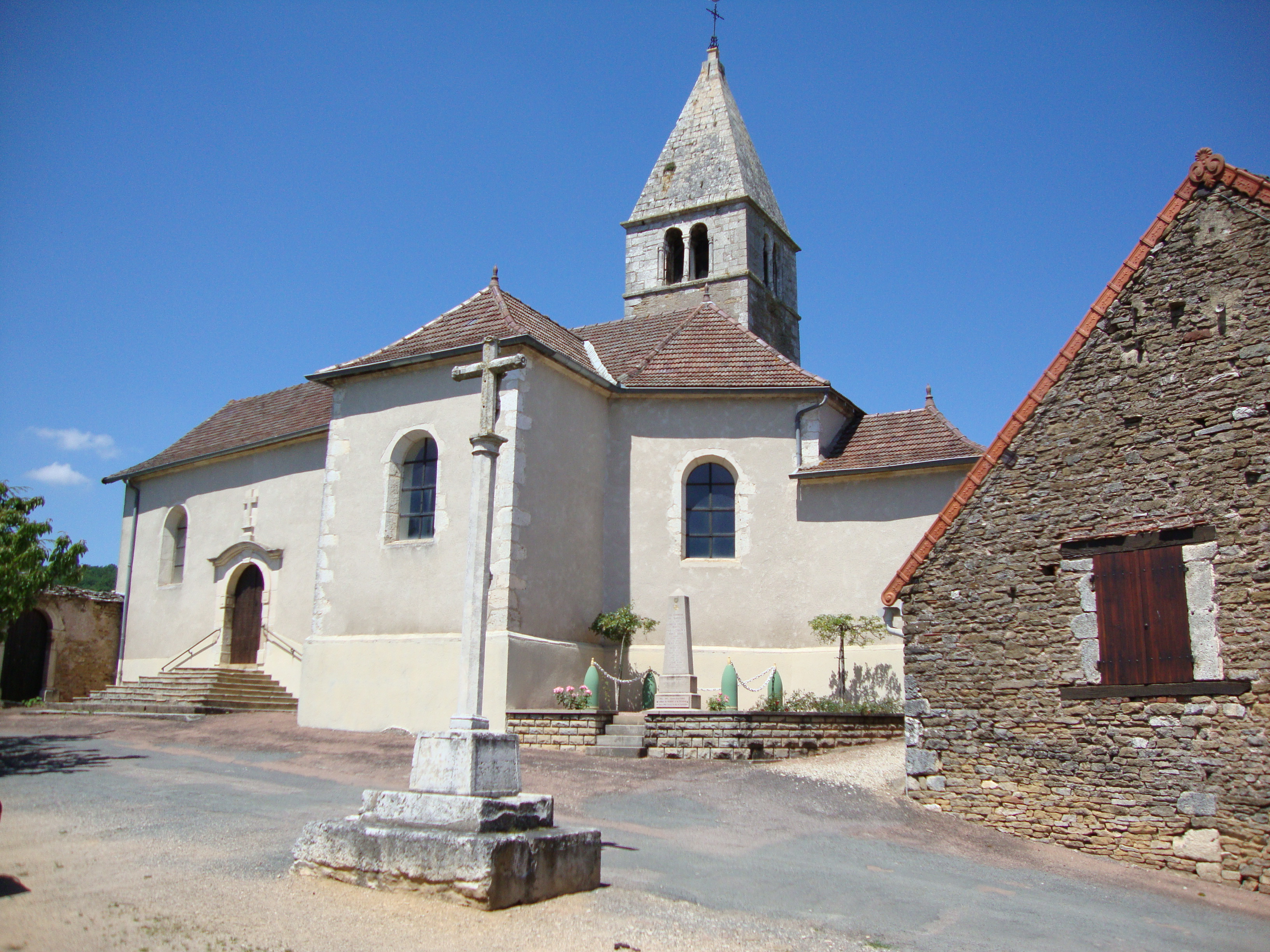
- The church, cross and war memorial in Saules
- Location of Saules
- Location within France Location within Bourgogne-Franche-Comté
- Coordinates: 46°39′26″N 4°40′21″E
- Country: France
- Region: Bourgogne-Franche-Comté
- Department: Saône-et-Loire
- Arrondissement: Chalon-sur-Saône
- Canton: Givry
- Area^{1}: 2.06 km^{2} (0.80 sq mi)
- Elevation: 220 m (720 ft)
- Highest elevation: 435 m (1,427 ft)
- Lowest elevation: 218 m (715 ft)
- Population (2023): 125
  - Density: 60.7/km^{2} (157/sq mi)
- Time zone: UTC+01:00 (CET)
  - Summer (DST): UTC+02:00 (CEST)
- INSEE/Postal code: 71503 /71390
- ^{1} French Land Register data, which excludes lakes, ponds, glaciers > 1 km^{2} (0.386 sq mi or 247 acres) and river estuaries.

Saules (French pronunciation: [sol]) is a commune in the Saône-et-Loire department in the region of Bourgogne-Franche-Comté in eastern France.

== See also ==
- Communes of the Saône-et-Loire department
