= Canton of Givry =

Coordinates: 46.78°N 4.74°E

The canton of Givry is an administrative division of the Saône-et-Loire department, eastern France. Its borders were modified at the French canton reorganisation which came into effect in March 2015. Its seat is in Givry.

It consists of the following communes:

1. Barizey
2. Bissey-sous-Cruchaud
3. Bissy-sur-Fley
4. Buxy
5. Cersot
6. Châtel-Moron
7. Chenôves
8. Culles-les-Roches
9. Dracy-le-Fort
10. Fley
11. Germagny
12. Givry
13. Granges
14. Jambles
15. Jully-lès-Buxy
16. Marcilly-lès-Buxy
17. Mellecey
18. Mercurey
19. Messey-sur-Grosne
20. Montagny-lès-Buxy
21. Moroges
22. Rosey
23. Saint-Boil
24. Saint-Denis-de-Vaux
25. Saint-Désert
26. Sainte-Hélène
27. Saint-Germain-lès-Buxy
28. Saint-Jean-de-Vaux
29. Saint-Mard-de-Vaux
30. Saint-Martin-d'Auxy
31. Saint-Martin-du-Tartre
32. Saint-Martin-sous-Montaigu
33. Saint-Maurice-des-Champs
34. Saint-Privé
35. Saint-Vallerin
36. Santilly
37. Sassangy
38. Saules
39. Savianges
40. Sercy
41. Villeneuve-en-Montagne
