= Saint-Désert =

- Commune
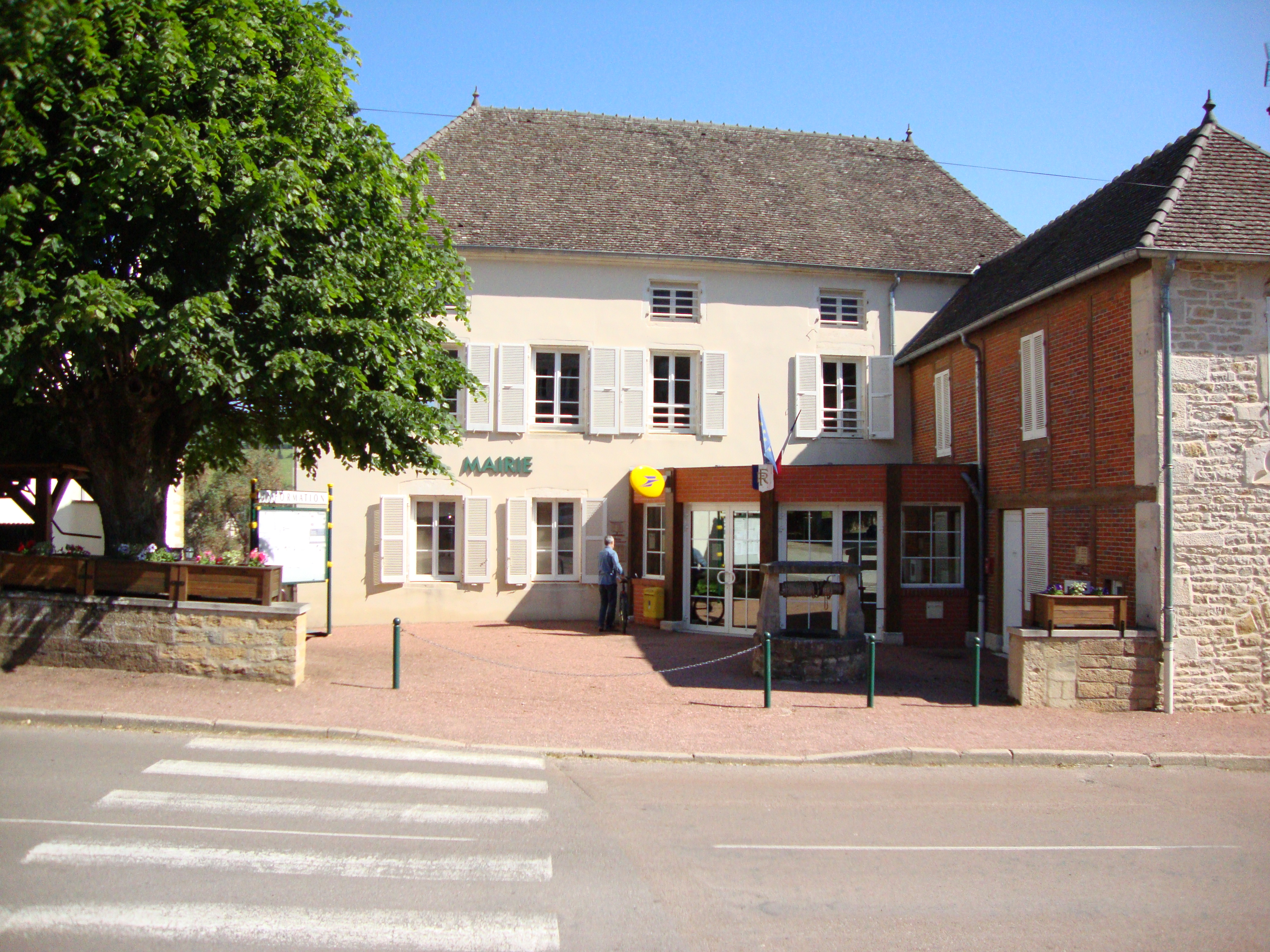
- The town hall in Saint-Désert

- Coat of arms
- Location of Saint-Désert
- Location within France Location within Bourgogne-Franche-Comté
- Coordinates: 46°45′18″N 4°42′35″E
- Country: France
- Region: Bourgogne-Franche-Comté
- Department: Saône-et-Loire
- Arrondissement: Chalon-sur-Saône
- Canton: Givry
- Intercommunality: CA Le Grand Chalon

Government
  - Mayor (2020–2026): Daniel Christel
- Area^{1}: 4.99 km^{2} (1.93 sq mi)
- Elevation: 217 m (712 ft)
- Highest elevation: 400 m (1,300 ft)
- Lowest elevation: 212 m (696 ft)
- Population (2023): 896
  - Density: 180/km^{2} (465/sq mi)
- Time zone: UTC+01:00 (CET)
  - Summer (DST): UTC+02:00 (CEST)
- INSEE/Postal code: 71404 /71390
- ^{1} French Land Register data, which excludes lakes, ponds, glaciers > 1 km^{2} (0.386 sq mi or 247 acres) and river estuaries.

Saint-Désert (French pronunciation: [sɛ̃ dezɛʁ]) is a commune in the Saône-et-Loire department in the region of Bourgogne-Franche-Comté in eastern France.

== See also ==
- Communes of the Saône-et-Loire department
