= Châtel-Moron =

- Commune
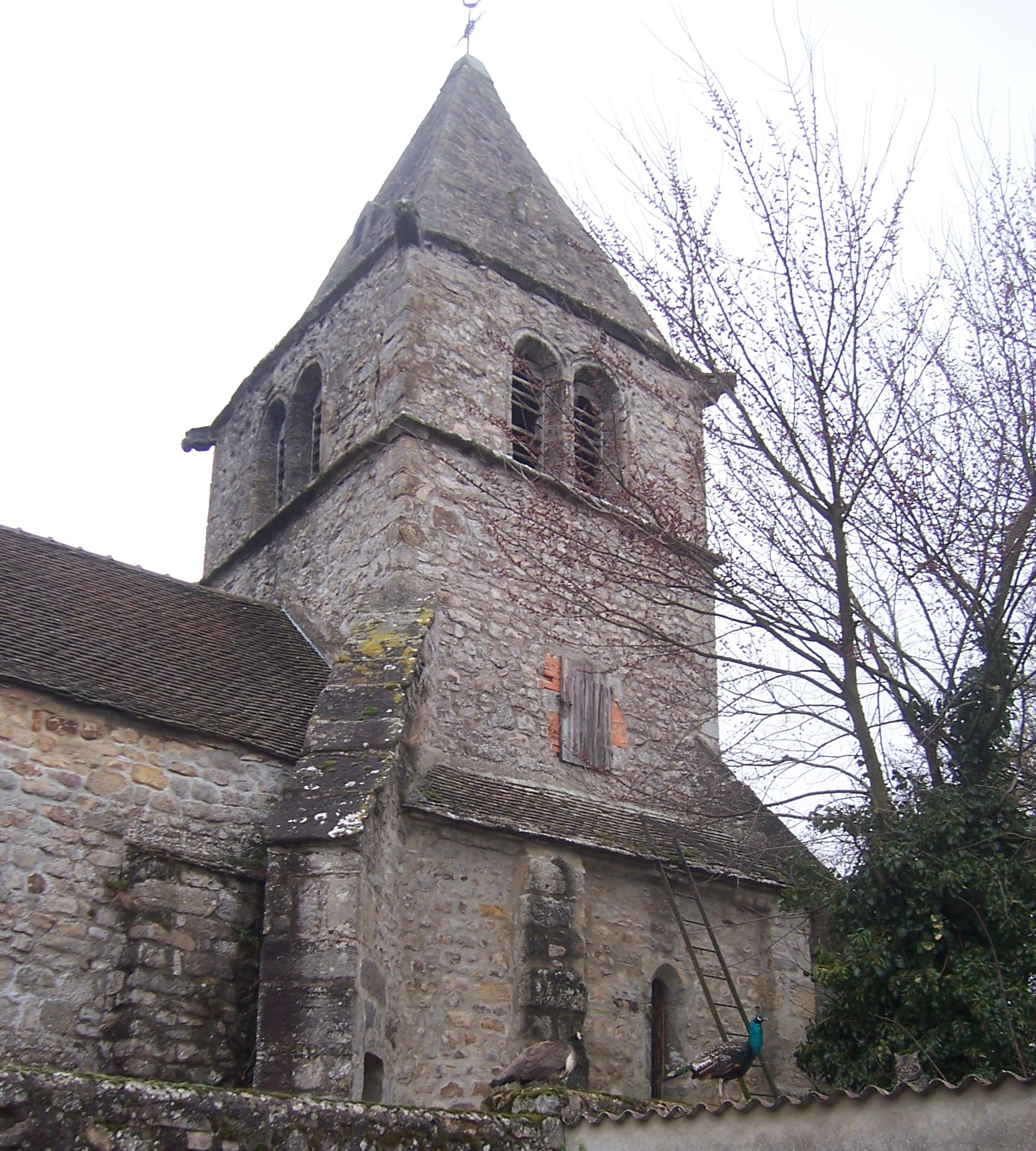
- The church in Châtel-Moron
- Location of Châtel-Moron
- Location within France Location within Bourgogne-Franche-Comté
- Coordinates: 46°47′39″N 4°38′52″E
- Country: France
- Region: Bourgogne-Franche-Comté
- Department: Saône-et-Loire
- Arrondissement: Chalon-sur-Saône
- Canton: Givry
- Intercommunality: Sud Côte Chalonnaise
- Area^{1}: 6.54 km^{2} (2.53 sq mi)
- Elevation: 504 m (1,654 ft)
- Highest elevation: 497 m (1,631 ft)
- Lowest elevation: 294 m (965 ft)
- Population (2023): 83
  - Density: 13/km^{2} (33/sq mi)
- Time zone: UTC+01:00 (CET)
  - Summer (DST): UTC+02:00 (CEST)
- INSEE/Postal code: 71115 /71510
- ^{1} French Land Register data, which excludes lakes, ponds, glaciers > 1 km^{2} (0.386 sq mi or 247 acres) and river estuaries.

Châtel-Moron (French pronunciation: [ʃatɛl mɔʁɔ̃]) is a commune in the Saône-et-Loire department in the region of Bourgogne-Franche-Comté in eastern France.

== See also ==
- Communes of the Saône-et-Loire department
