= Culles-les-Roches =

- Commune
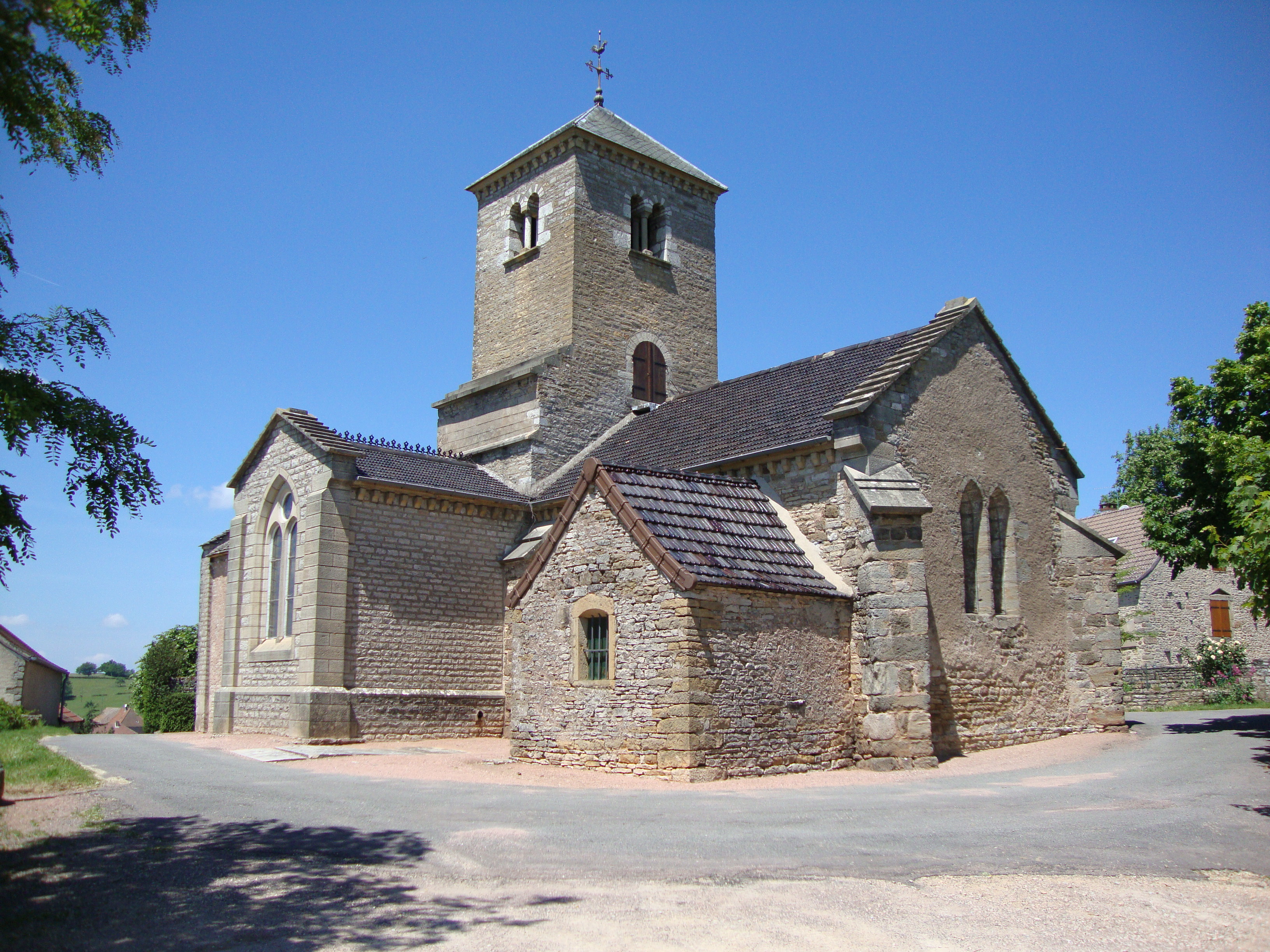
- The church in Culles-les-Roches

- Coat of arms
- Location of Culles-les-Roches
- Location within France Location within Bourgogne-Franche-Comté
- Coordinates: 46°39′10″N 4°39′14″E
- Country: France
- Region: Bourgogne-Franche-Comté
- Department: Saône-et-Loire
- Arrondissement: Chalon-sur-Saône
- Canton: Givry
- Intercommunality: Sud Côte Chalonnaise

Government
  - Mayor (2020–2026): Michel Duchamp
- Area^{1}: 8.9 km^{2} (3.4 sq mi)
- Elevation: 400 m (1,300 ft)
- Highest elevation: 446 m (1,463 ft)
- Lowest elevation: 236 m (774 ft)
- Population (2023): 199
  - Density: 22/km^{2} (58/sq mi)
- Time zone: UTC+01:00 (CET)
  - Summer (DST): UTC+02:00 (CEST)
- INSEE/Postal code: 71159 /71460
- ^{1} French Land Register data, which excludes lakes, ponds, glaciers > 1 km^{2} (0.386 sq mi or 247 acres) and river estuaries.

Culles-les-Roches (French pronunciation: [kyl le ʁɔʃ]) is a commune in the Saône-et-Loire department in the region of Bourgogne-Franche-Comté in eastern France.

== See also ==
- Communes of the Saône-et-Loire department
