= Sassangy =

- Commune
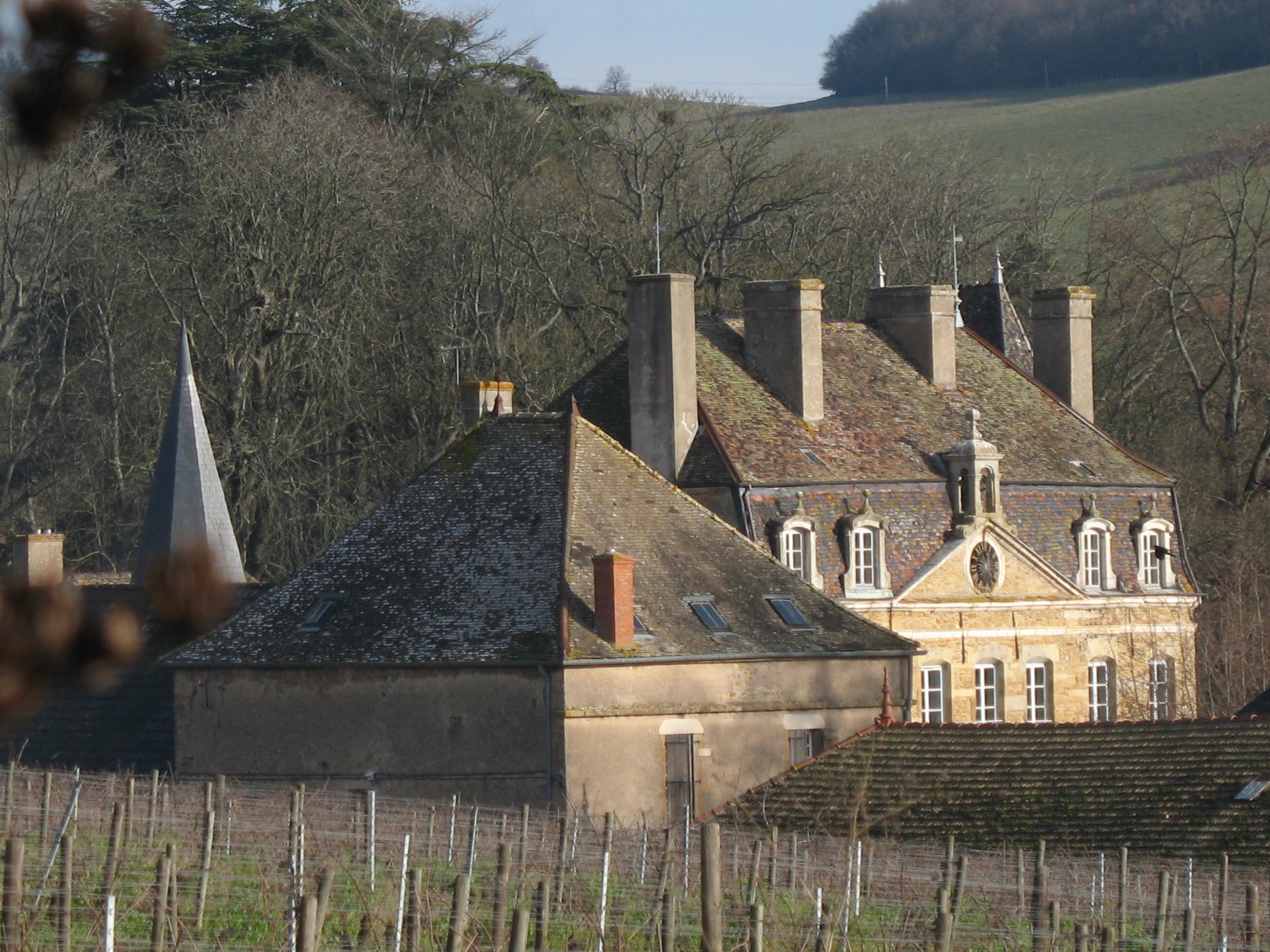
- Chateau
- Location of Sassangy
- Location within France Location within Bourgogne-Franche-Comté
- Coordinates: 46°43′16″N 4°38′25″E
- Country: France
- Region: Bourgogne-Franche-Comté
- Department: Saône-et-Loire
- Arrondissement: Chalon-sur-Saône
- Canton: Givry
- Intercommunality: Sud Côte Chalonnaise

Government
  - Mayor (2023–2026): Michel Boivin
- Area^{1}: 6.25 km^{2} (2.41 sq mi)
- Elevation: 345 m (1,132 ft)
- Highest elevation: 440 m (1,440 ft)
- Lowest elevation: 269 m (883 ft)
- Population (2023): 141
  - Density: 22.6/km^{2} (58.4/sq mi)
- Time zone: UTC+01:00 (CET)
  - Summer (DST): UTC+02:00 (CEST)
- INSEE/Postal code: 71501 /71390
- ^{1} French Land Register data, which excludes lakes, ponds, glaciers > 1 km^{2} (0.386 sq mi or 247 acres) and river estuaries.

Sassangy (French pronunciation: [sasɑ̃ʒi]) is a commune in the Saône-et-Loire department in the region of Bourgogne-Franche-Comté in eastern France.

== See also ==
- Communes of the Saône-et-Loire department
