= Bissey-sous-Cruchaud =

- Commune
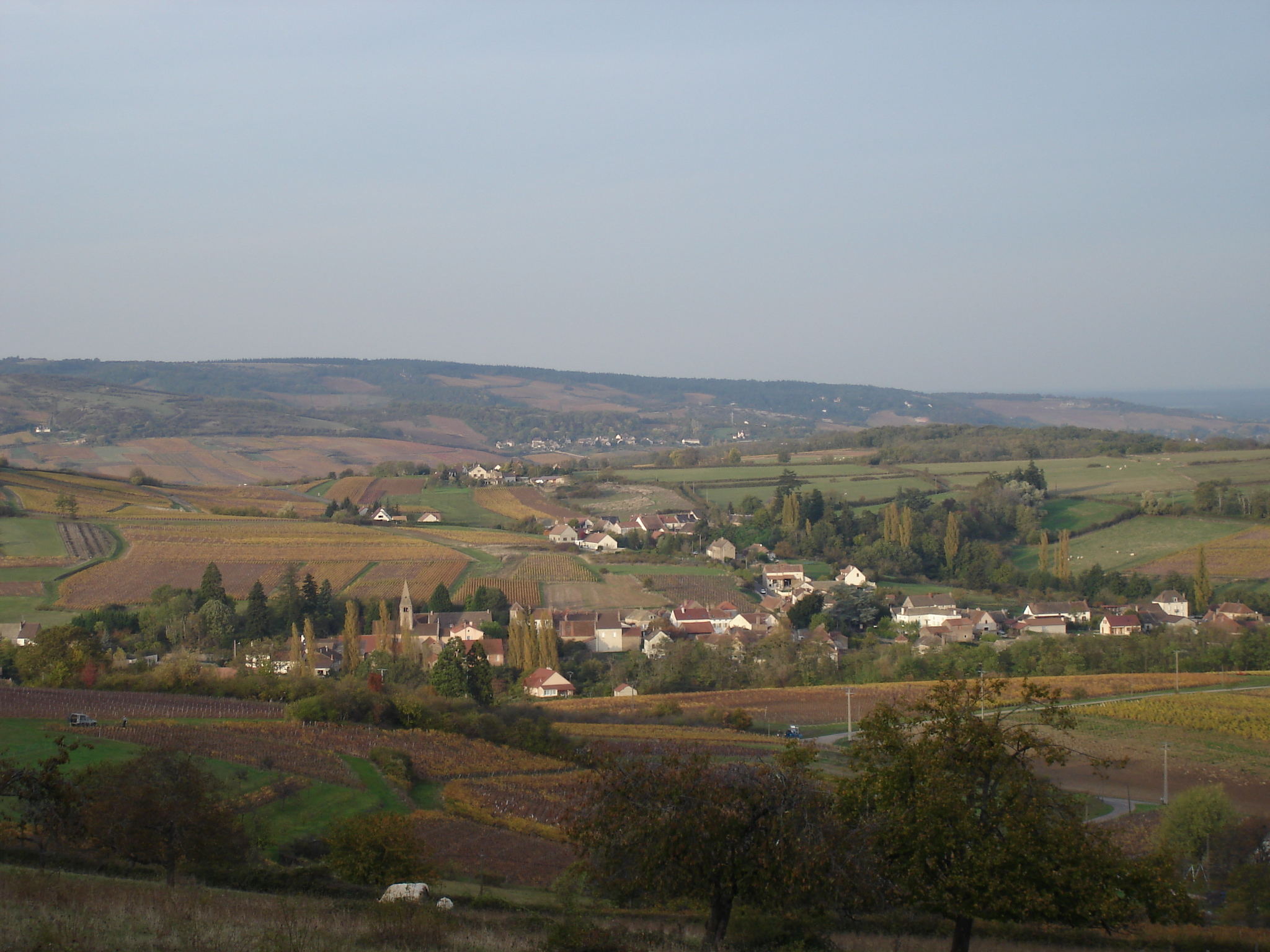
- Location of Bissey-sous-Cruchaud
- Location within France Location within Bourgogne-Franche-Comté
- Coordinates: 46°43′57″N 4°41′05″E
- Country: France
- Region: Bourgogne-Franche-Comté
- Department: Saône-et-Loire
- Arrondissement: Chalon-sur-Saône
- Canton: Givry
- Intercommunality: Sud Côte Chalonnaise

Government
  - Mayor (2024–2026): Bruno Renaudin
- Area^{1}: 11.22 km^{2} (4.33 sq mi)
- Elevation: 300 m (980 ft)
- Highest elevation: 468 m (1,535 ft)
- Lowest elevation: 191 m (627 ft)
- Population (2023): 333
  - Density: 29.7/km^{2} (76.9/sq mi)
- Time zone: UTC+01:00 (CET)
  - Summer (DST): UTC+02:00 (CEST)
- INSEE/Postal code: 71034 /71390
- ^{1} French Land Register data, which excludes lakes, ponds, glaciers > 1 km^{2} (0.386 sq mi or 247 acres) and river estuaries.

Bissey-sous-Cruchaud (French pronunciation: [bisɛ su kʁyʃo]) is a commune in the Saône-et-Loire department in the region of Bourgogne-Franche-Comté in eastern France.

== Population ==
Historical population
Year	Pop.	±% p.a.
1968	270	—
1975	245	−1.38%
1982	248	+0.17%
1990	279	+1.48%
1999	334	+2.02%
2007	360	+0.94%
2012	339	−1.19%
2017	341	+0.12%
2023	333	−0.39%
Source: INSEE

== See also ==
- Communes of the Saône-et-Loire department
