= Granges, Saône-et-Loire =

Granges
- Commune
- The church in Granges

- Coat of arms
- Location of Granges
- Location within France Location within Bourgogne-Franche-Comté
- Coordinates: 46°43′51″N 4°45′01″E
- Country: France
- Region: Bourgogne-Franche-Comté
- Department: Saône-et-Loire
- Arrondissement: Chalon-sur-Saône
- Canton: Givry
- Intercommunality: Sud Côte Chalonnaise
- Area^{1}: 10.83 km^{2} (4.18 sq mi)
- Elevation: 200 m (660 ft)
- Highest elevation: 222 m (728 ft)
- Lowest elevation: 184 m (604 ft)
- Population (2023): 581
  - Density: 53.6/km^{2} (139/sq mi)
- Time zone: UTC+01:00 (CET)
  - Summer (DST): UTC+02:00 (CEST)
- INSEE/Postal code: 71225 /71390
- ^{1} French Land Register data, which excludes lakes, ponds, glaciers > 1 km^{2} (0.386 sq mi or 247 acres) and river estuaries.

Granges (French pronunciation: [ɡʁɑ̃ʒ]) is a commune in the Saône-et-Loire department in the region of Bourgogne-Franche-Comté in eastern France.

== See also ==
- Communes of the Saône-et-Loire department
