= Saint-Privé, Saône-et-Loire =

Saint-Privé
- Commune
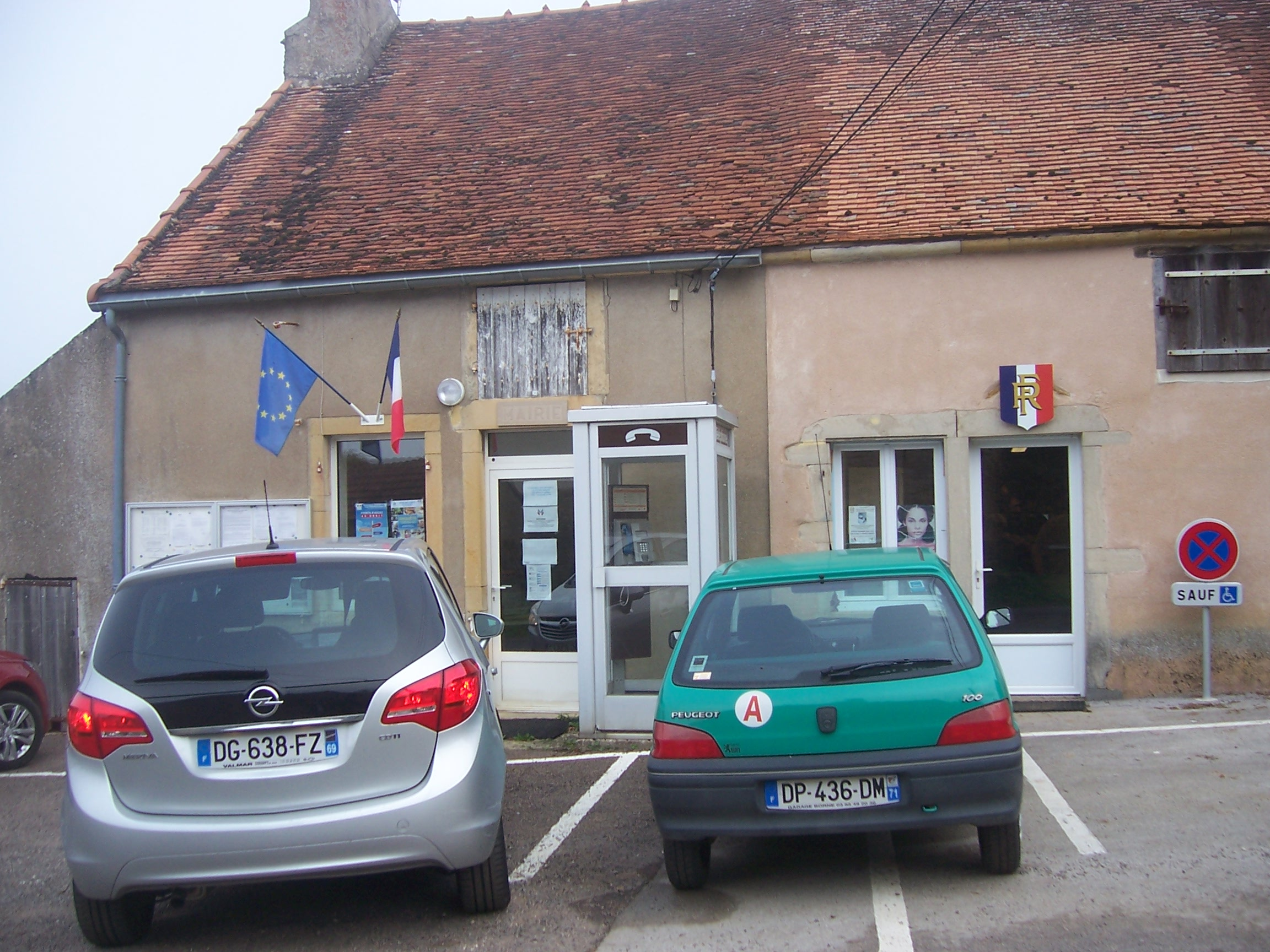
- The town hall in Saint-Privé
- Location of Saint-Privé
- Location within France Location within Bourgogne-Franche-Comté
- Coordinates: 46°42′24″N 4°34′50″E
- Country: France
- Region: Bourgogne-Franche-Comté
- Department: Saône-et-Loire
- Arrondissement: Chalon-sur-Saône
- Canton: Givry
- Area^{1}: 5.21 km^{2} (2.01 sq mi)
- Elevation: 300 m (980 ft)
- Highest elevation: 405 m (1,329 ft)
- Lowest elevation: 263 m (863 ft)
- Population (2023): 100
  - Density: 19/km^{2} (50/sq mi)
- Time zone: UTC+01:00 (CET)
  - Summer (DST): UTC+02:00 (CEST)
- INSEE/Postal code: 71471 /71390
- ^{1} French Land Register data, which excludes lakes, ponds, glaciers > 1 km^{2} (0.386 sq mi or 247 acres) and river estuaries.

Saint-Privé (French pronunciation: [sɛ̃ pʁive]) is a commune in the Saône-et-Loire department in the region of Bourgogne-Franche-Comté in eastern France.

== See also ==
- Communes of the Saône-et-Loire department
