= Sainte-Hélène, Saône-et-Loire =

Sainte-Hélène
- Commune
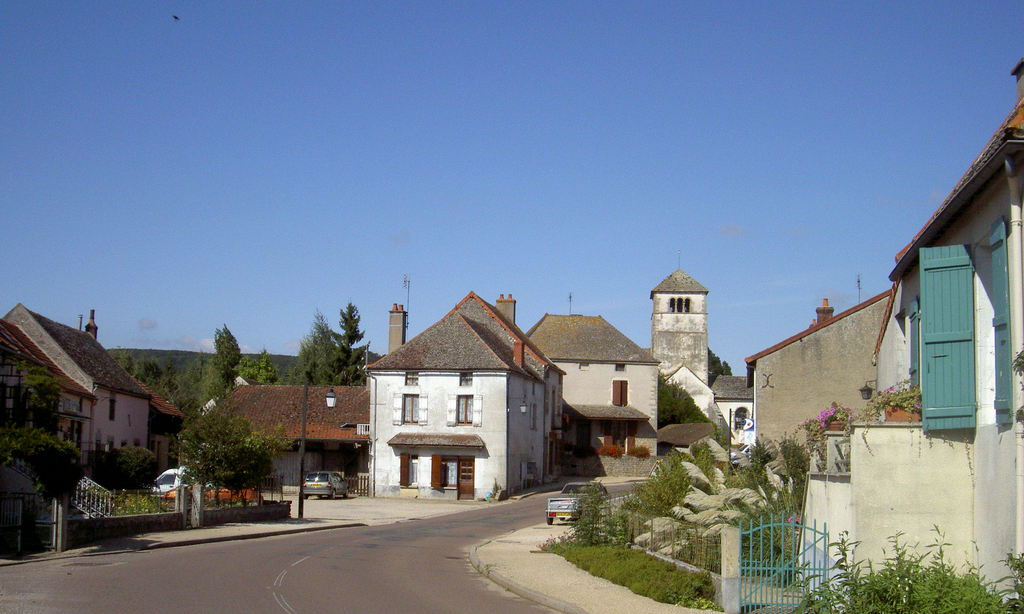
- A view within Sainte-Hélène
- Location of Sainte-Hélène
- Location within France Location within Bourgogne-Franche-Comté
- Coordinates: 46°45′27″N 4°38′40″E
- Country: France
- Region: Bourgogne-Franche-Comté
- Department: Saône-et-Loire
- Arrondissement: Chalon-sur-Saône
- Canton: Givry
- Area^{1}: 14.27 km^{2} (5.51 sq mi)
- Elevation: 343 m (1,125 ft)
- Highest elevation: 496 m (1,627 ft)
- Lowest elevation: 282 m (925 ft)
- Population (2023): 511
  - Density: 35.8/km^{2} (92.7/sq mi)
- Time zone: UTC+01:00 (CET)
  - Summer (DST): UTC+02:00 (CEST)
- INSEE/Postal code: 71426 /71390
- ^{1} French Land Register data, which excludes lakes, ponds, glaciers > 1 km^{2} (0.386 sq mi or 247 acres) and river estuaries.

Sainte-Hélène (French pronunciation: [sɛ̃t elɛn]) is a commune in the Saône-et-Loire department in the region of Bourgogne-Franche-Comté in eastern France.

== See also ==
- Communes of the Saône-et-Loire department
