= Moroges =

- Commune
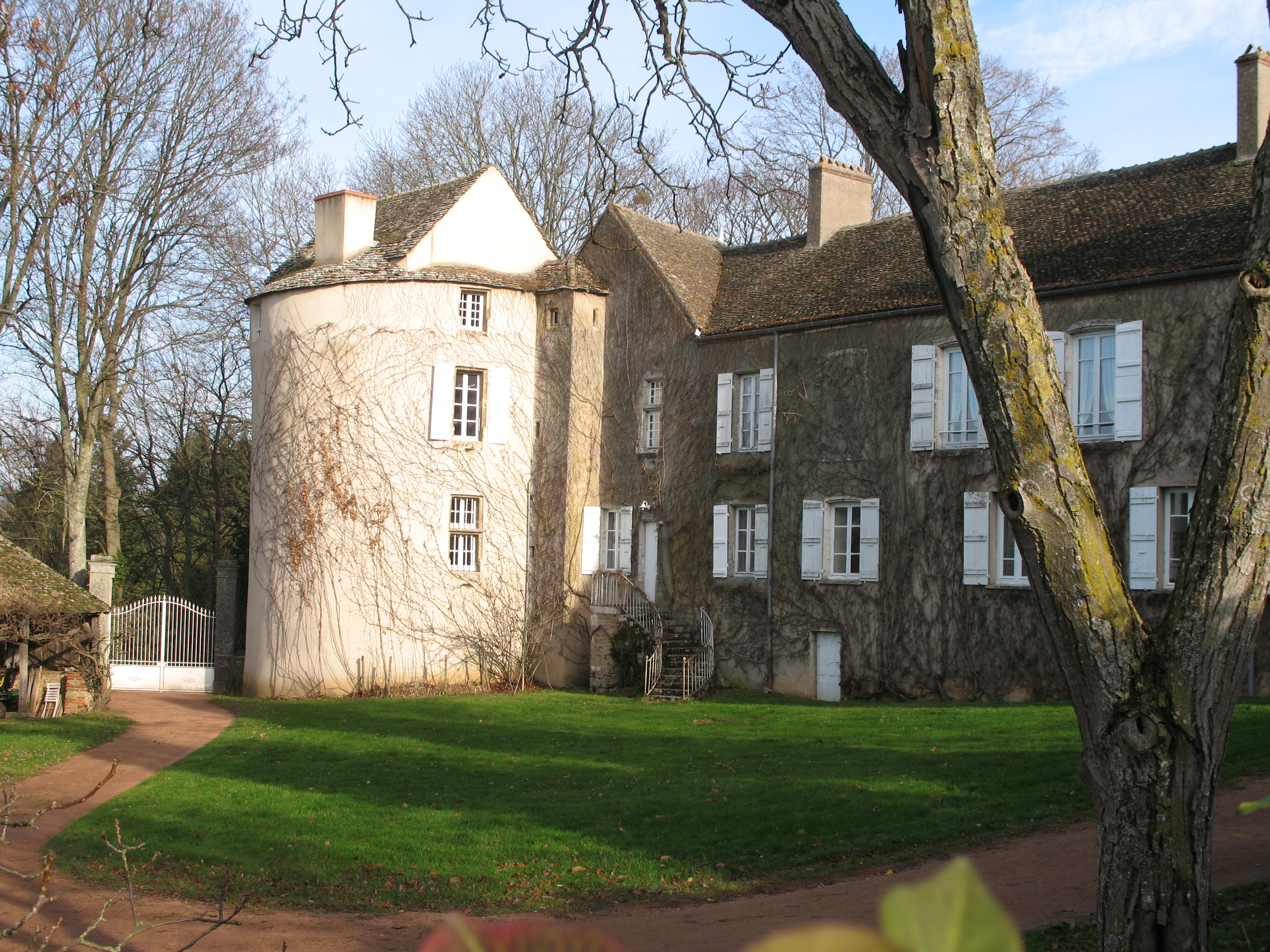
- Chateau

- Coat of arms
- Location of Moroges
- Location within France Location within Bourgogne-Franche-Comté
- Coordinates: 46°45′08″N 4°40′43″E
- Country: France
- Region: Bourgogne-Franche-Comté
- Department: Saône-et-Loire
- Arrondissement: Chalon-sur-Saône
- Canton: Givry
- Intercommunality: Sud Côte Chalonnaise

Government
  - Mayor (2020–2026): Marie-Hélène Porot
- Area^{1}: 8.72 km^{2} (3.37 sq mi)
- Elevation: 347 m (1,138 ft)
- Highest elevation: 467 m (1,532 ft)
- Lowest elevation: 239 m (784 ft)
- Population (2023): 599
  - Density: 68.7/km^{2} (178/sq mi)
- Time zone: UTC+01:00 (CET)
  - Summer (DST): UTC+02:00 (CEST)
- INSEE/Postal code: 71324 /71390
- ^{1} French Land Register data, which excludes lakes, ponds, glaciers > 1 km^{2} (0.386 sq mi or 247 acres) and river estuaries.

Moroges (French pronunciation: [mɔʁɔʒ]) is a commune in the Saône-et-Loire department in the region of Bourgogne-Franche-Comté in eastern France.

== See also ==
- Communes of the Saône-et-Loire department
