= Saint-Martin-du-Tartre =

- Commune
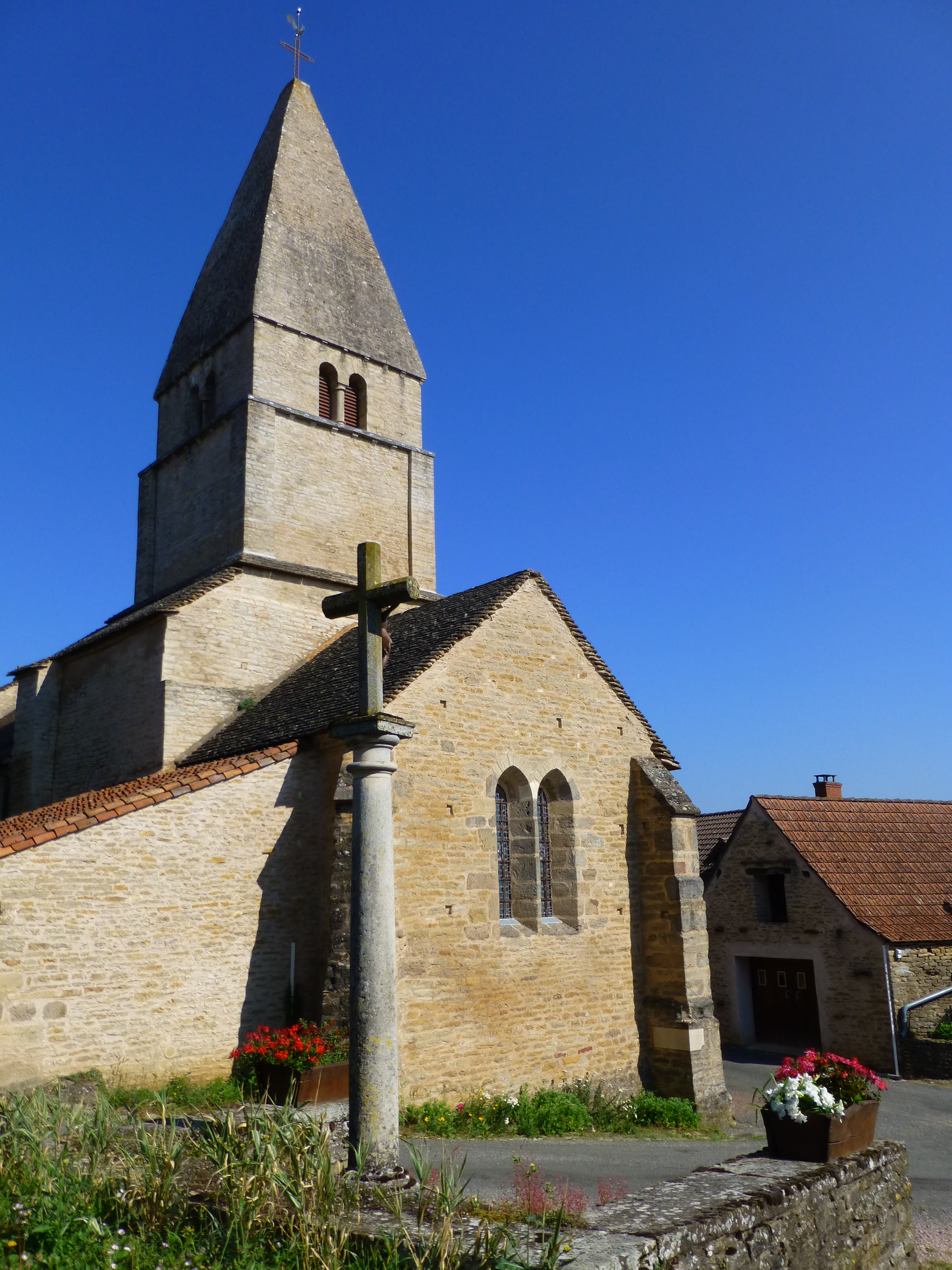
- The church in Saint-Martin-du-Tartre
- Location of Saint-Martin-du-Tartre
- Location within France Location within Bourgogne-Franche-Comté
- Coordinates: 46°38′23″N 4°36′50″E
- Country: France
- Region: Bourgogne-Franche-Comté
- Department: Saône-et-Loire
- Arrondissement: Chalon-sur-Saône
- Canton: Givry
- Area^{1}: 8.03 km^{2} (3.10 sq mi)
- Elevation: 416 m (1,365 ft)
- Highest elevation: 452 m (1,483 ft)
- Lowest elevation: 242 m (794 ft)
- Population (2023): 148
  - Density: 18.4/km^{2} (47.7/sq mi)
- Time zone: UTC+01:00 (CET)
  - Summer (DST): UTC+02:00 (CEST)
- INSEE/Postal code: 71455 /71460
- ^{1} French Land Register data, which excludes lakes, ponds, glaciers > 1 km^{2} (0.386 sq mi or 247 acres) and river estuaries.

Saint-Martin-du-Tartre (French pronunciation: [sɛ̃ maʁtɛ̃ dy taʁtʁ]) is a commune in the Saône-et-Loire department in the region of Bourgogne-Franche-Comté in eastern France.

== See also ==
- Communes of the Saône-et-Loire department
