= Cersot =

- Commune
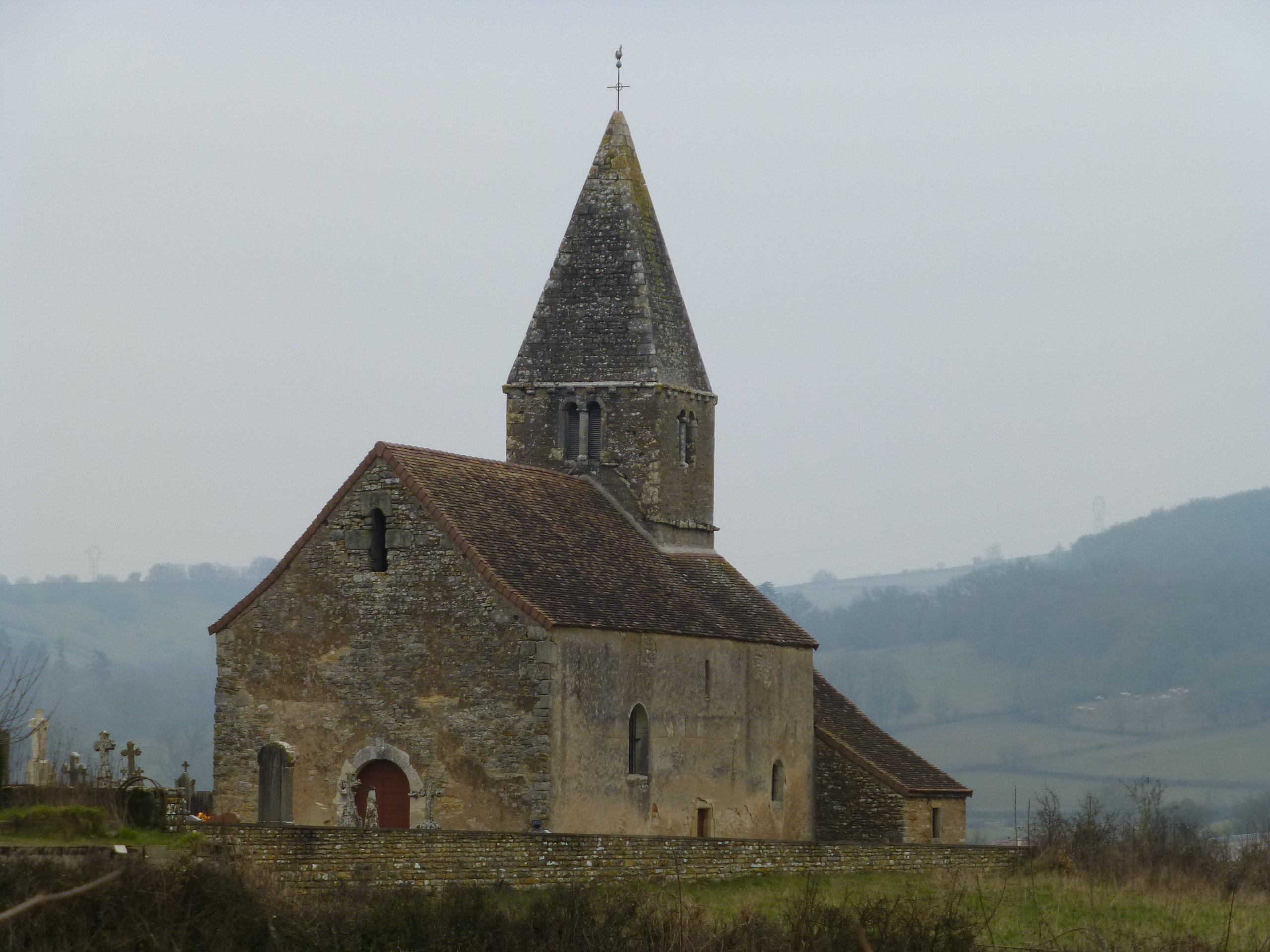
- The church in Cersot
- Location of Cersot
- Location within France Location within Bourgogne-Franche-Comté
- Coordinates: 46°42′36″N 4°37′39″E
- Country: France
- Region: Bourgogne-Franche-Comté
- Department: Saône-et-Loire
- Arrondissement: Chalon-sur-Saône
- Canton: Givry
- Intercommunality: Sud Côte Chalonnaise

Government
  - Mayor (2024–2026): Hervé Cottin
- Area^{1}: 6.02 km^{2} (2.32 sq mi)
- Elevation: 387 m (1,270 ft)
- Highest elevation: 463 m (1,519 ft)
- Lowest elevation: 261 m (856 ft)
- Population (2023): 142
  - Density: 23.6/km^{2} (61.1/sq mi)
- Time zone: UTC+01:00 (CET)
  - Summer (DST): UTC+02:00 (CEST)
- INSEE/Postal code: 71072 /71390
- ^{1} French Land Register data, which excludes lakes, ponds, glaciers > 1 km^{2} (0.386 sq mi or 247 acres) and river estuaries.

Cersot (French pronunciation: [sɛʁso]) is a commune in the Saône-et-Loire department in the region of Bourgogne-Franche-Comté in eastern France.

== See also ==
- Communes of the Saône-et-Loire department
