= Fley =

- Commune
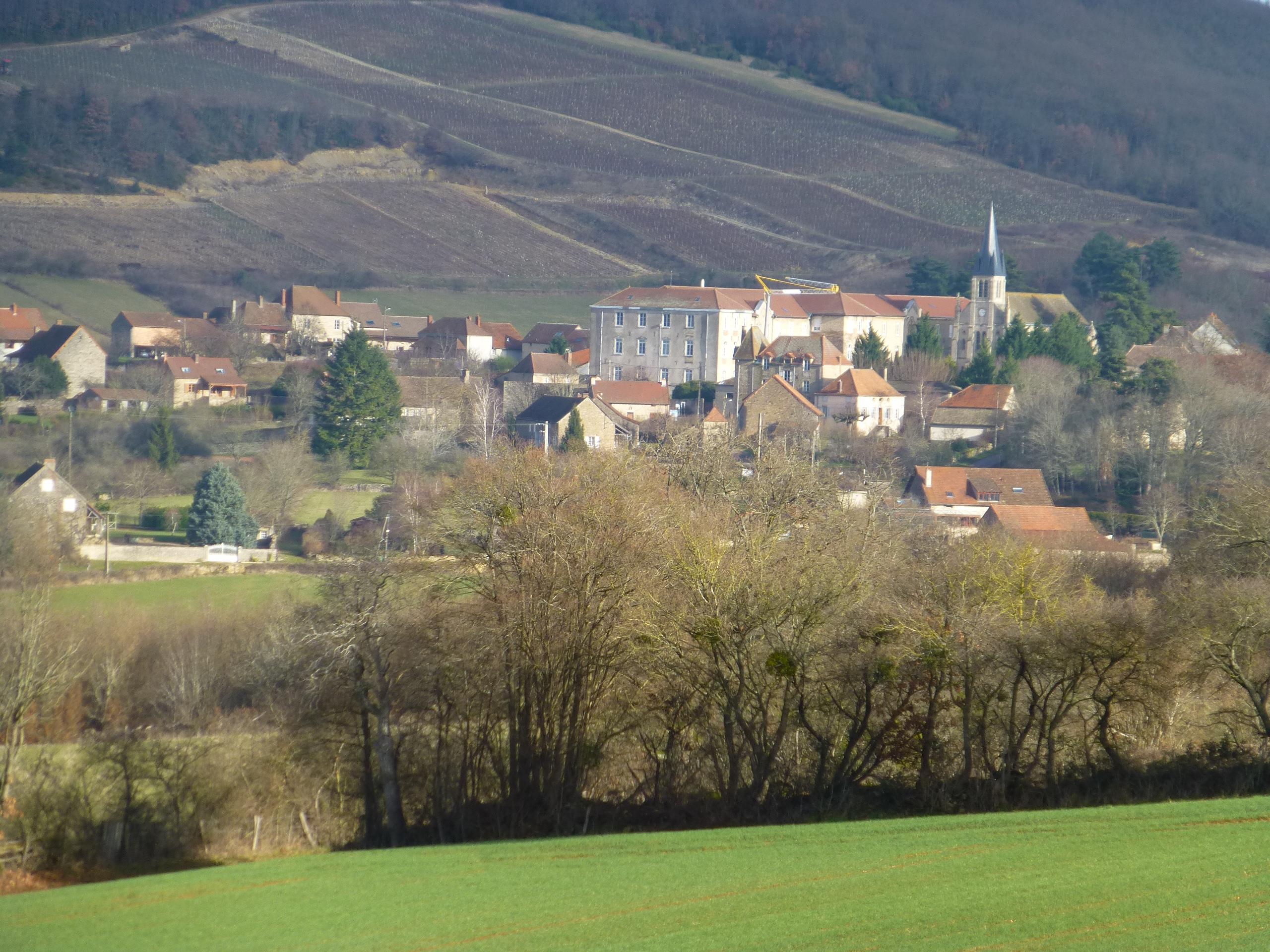
- A general view of Fley
- Location of Fley
- Location within France Location within Bourgogne-Franche-Comté
- Coordinates: 46°40′12″N 4°38′29″E
- Country: France
- Region: Bourgogne-Franche-Comté
- Department: Saône-et-Loire
- Arrondissement: Chalon-sur-Saône
- Canton: Givry
- Area^{1}: 8.52 km^{2} (3.29 sq mi)
- Elevation: 285 m (935 ft)
- Highest elevation: 460 m (1,510 ft)
- Lowest elevation: 269 m (883 ft)
- Population (2023): 192
  - Density: 22.5/km^{2} (58.4/sq mi)
- Time zone: UTC+01:00 (CET)
  - Summer (DST): UTC+02:00 (CEST)
- INSEE/Postal code: 71201 /71390
- ^{1} French Land Register data, which excludes lakes, ponds, glaciers > 1 km^{2} (0.386 sq mi or 247 acres) and river estuaries.

Fley (French pronunciation: [flɛ]) is a commune in the Saône-et-Loire department in the region of Bourgogne-Franche-Comté in eastern France.

== See also ==
- Communes of the Saône-et-Loire department
