= Morey =

- Commune
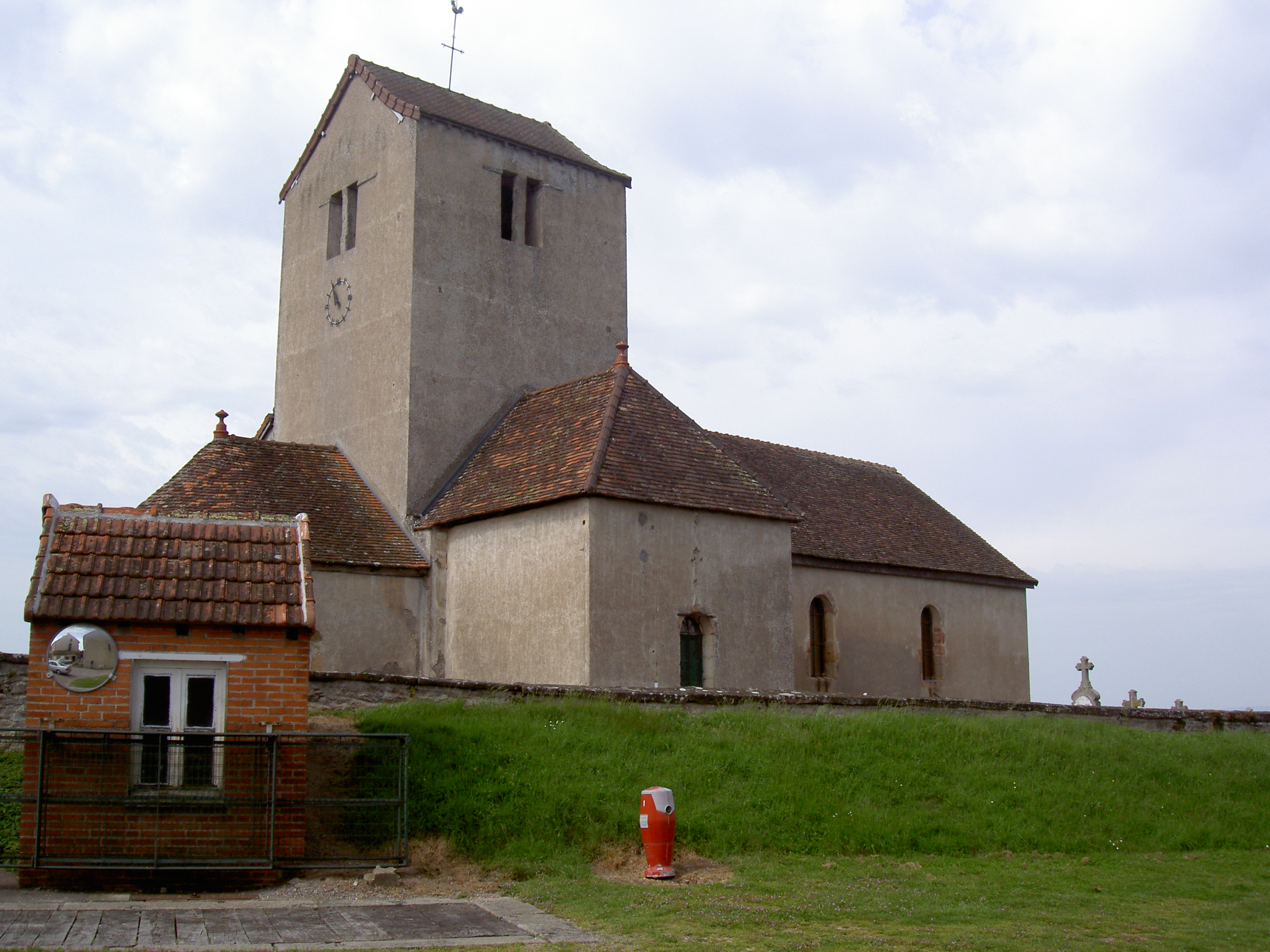
- The church in Morey
- Location of Morey
- Location within France Location within Bourgogne-Franche-Comté
- Coordinates: 46°48′04″N 4°36′09″E
- Country: France
- Region: Bourgogne-Franche-Comté
- Department: Saône-et-Loire
- Arrondissement: Autun
- Canton: Chagny
- Intercommunality: CU Creusot Montceau

Government
  - Mayor (2020–2026): Kader Atteye
- Area^{1}: 13.32 km^{2} (5.14 sq mi)
- Elevation: 400 m (1,300 ft)
- Highest elevation: 438 m (1,437 ft)
- Lowest elevation: 242 m (794 ft)
- Population (2023): 190
  - Density: 14/km^{2} (37/sq mi)
- Time zone: UTC+01:00 (CET)
  - Summer (DST): UTC+02:00 (CEST)
- INSEE/Postal code: 71321 /71510
- ^{1} French Land Register data, which excludes lakes, ponds, glaciers > 1 km^{2} (0.386 sq mi or 247 acres) and river estuaries.

Morey (French pronunciation: [mɔʁɛ]) is a commune in the Saône-et-Loire department in the region of Bourgogne-Franche-Comté in eastern France.

== Geography ==
Morey is located in the hills surrounding the Dheune river and the Canal Du Centre. In addition to the main village, several hamlets are also parts of Morey:

- Fangey-le-bas
- Fangey-le-haut
- Baugey
- Nuit

The village is surrounded by the communes of Châtel-Moron, Essertenne, Villeneuve-en-Montagne, Saint-Bérain-sur-Dheune, Saint-Julien-sur-Dheune.

== History ==
Anciently named "Moreyurn", the village was a dependency of the baron of Couches.

== See also ==
- Communes of the Saône-et-Loire department
