= Dracy (disambiguation) =

Dracy is the name or partial name of several communes in France:

- Dracy, in the Yonne department
- Dracy-Saint-Loup, in the Saône-et-Loire department
- Dracy-le-Fort, in the Saône-et-Loire department
- Dracy-lès-Couches, in the Saône-et-Loire department
