= Saint-Maurice-lès-Couches =

- Commune
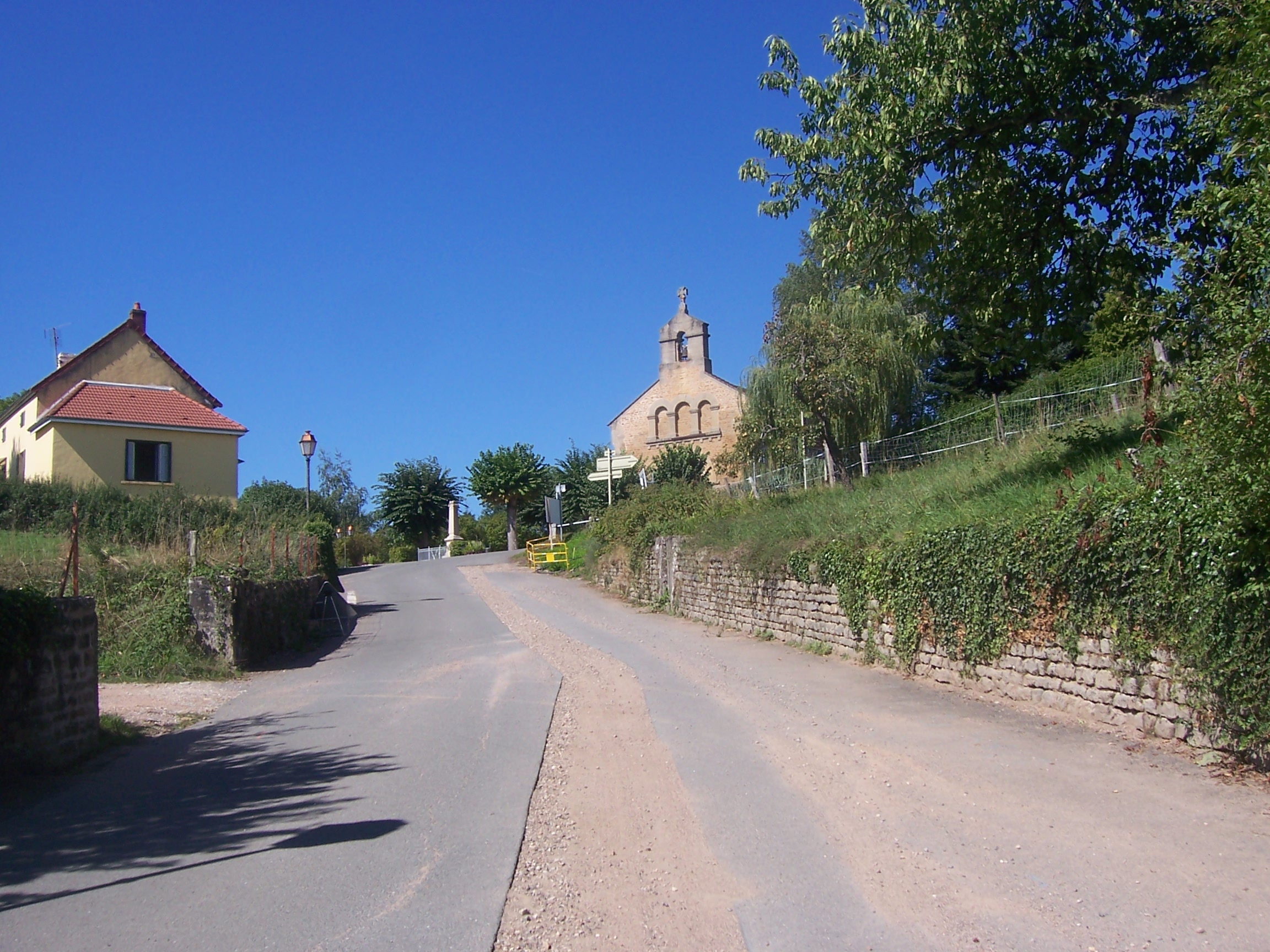
- The church and surroundings in Saint-Maurice-lès-Couches

- Coat of arms
- Location of Saint-Maurice-lès-Couches
- Location within France Location within Bourgogne-Franche-Comté
- Coordinates: 46°52′50″N 4°36′05″E
- Country: France
- Region: Bourgogne-Franche-Comté
- Department: Saône-et-Loire
- Arrondissement: Autun
- Canton: Chagny

Government
  - Mayor (2020–2026): Olivier Barre
- Area^{1}: 4.69 km^{2} (1.81 sq mi)
- Elevation: 350 m (1,150 ft)
- Highest elevation: 385 m (1,263 ft)
- Lowest elevation: 236 m (774 ft)
- Population (2023): 176
  - Density: 37.5/km^{2} (97.2/sq mi)
- Time zone: UTC+01:00 (CET)
  - Summer (DST): UTC+02:00 (CEST)
- INSEE/Postal code: 71464 /71490
- ^{1} French Land Register data, which excludes lakes, ponds, glaciers > 1 km^{2} (0.386 sq mi or 247 acres) and river estuaries.

Saint-Maurice-lès-Couches (French pronunciation: [sɛ̃ mɔʁis lɛ kuʃ]; literally "Saint-Maurice near Couches") is a commune in the Saône-et-Loire department in the region of Bourgogne-Franche-Comté in eastern France.

== See also ==
- Communes of the Saône-et-Loire department
