= Chaudenay, Saône-et-Loire =

Chaudenay
- Commune
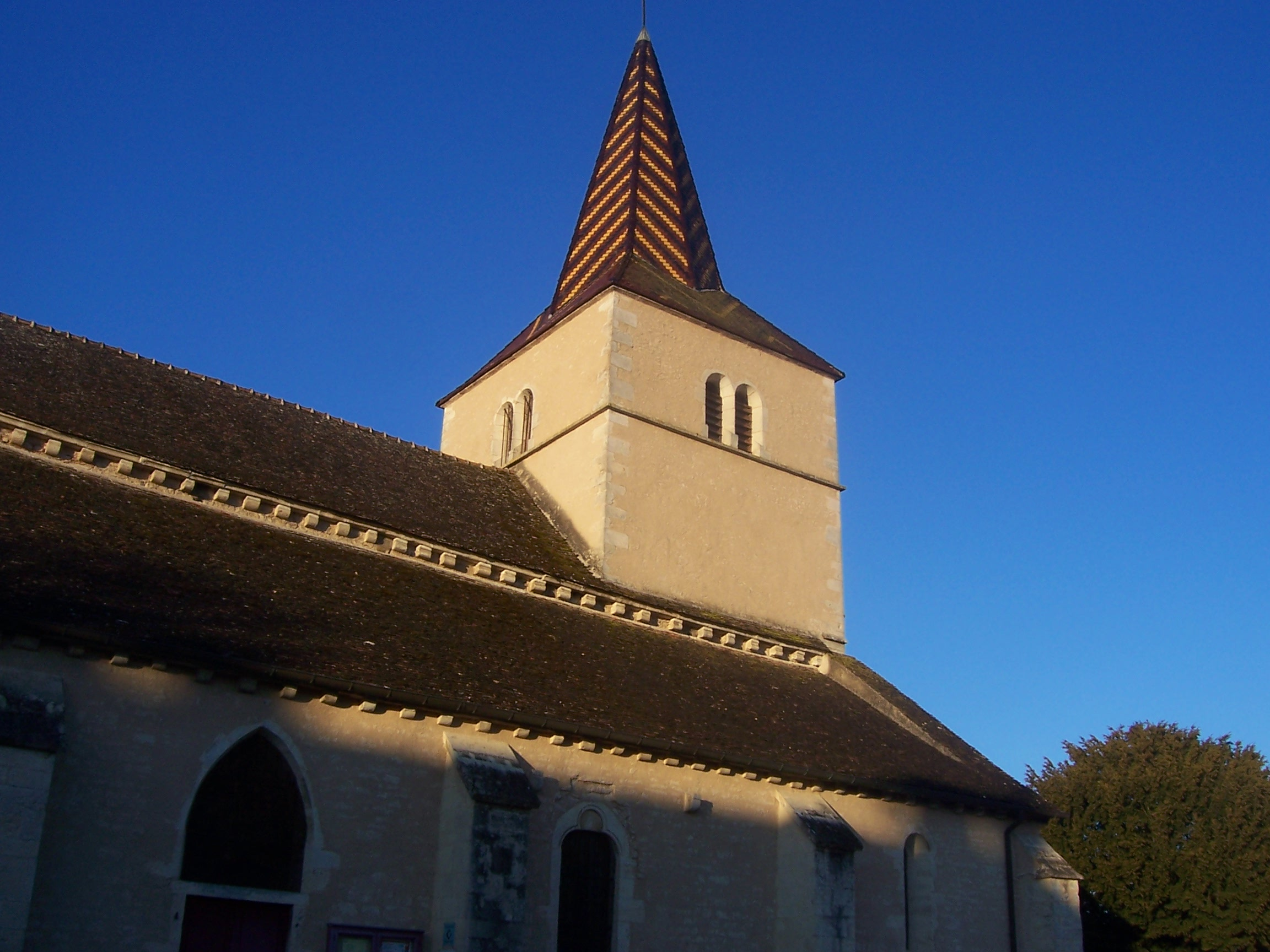
- The church in Chaudenay
- Location of Chaudenay
- Location within France Location within Bourgogne-Franche-Comté
- Coordinates: 46°54′56″N 4°47′36″E
- Country: France
- Region: Bourgogne-Franche-Comté
- Department: Saône-et-Loire
- Arrondissement: Chalon-sur-Saône
- Canton: Chagny
- Intercommunality: CA Beaune Côte et Sud

Government
  - Mayor (2020–2026): Catherine Pappas
- Area^{1}: 8.17 km^{2} (3.15 sq mi)
- Elevation: 212 m (696 ft)
- Highest elevation: 232 m (761 ft)
- Lowest elevation: 196 m (643 ft)
- Population (2023): 1,116
  - Density: 137/km^{2} (354/sq mi)
- Time zone: UTC+01:00 (CET)
  - Summer (DST): UTC+02:00 (CEST)
- INSEE/Postal code: 71119 /71150
- ^{1} French Land Register data, which excludes lakes, ponds, glaciers > 1 km^{2} (0.386 sq mi or 247 acres) and river estuaries.

Chaudenay (French pronunciation: [ʃodnɛ]) is a commune in the Saône-et-Loire department in the region of Bourgogne-Franche-Comté in eastern France.

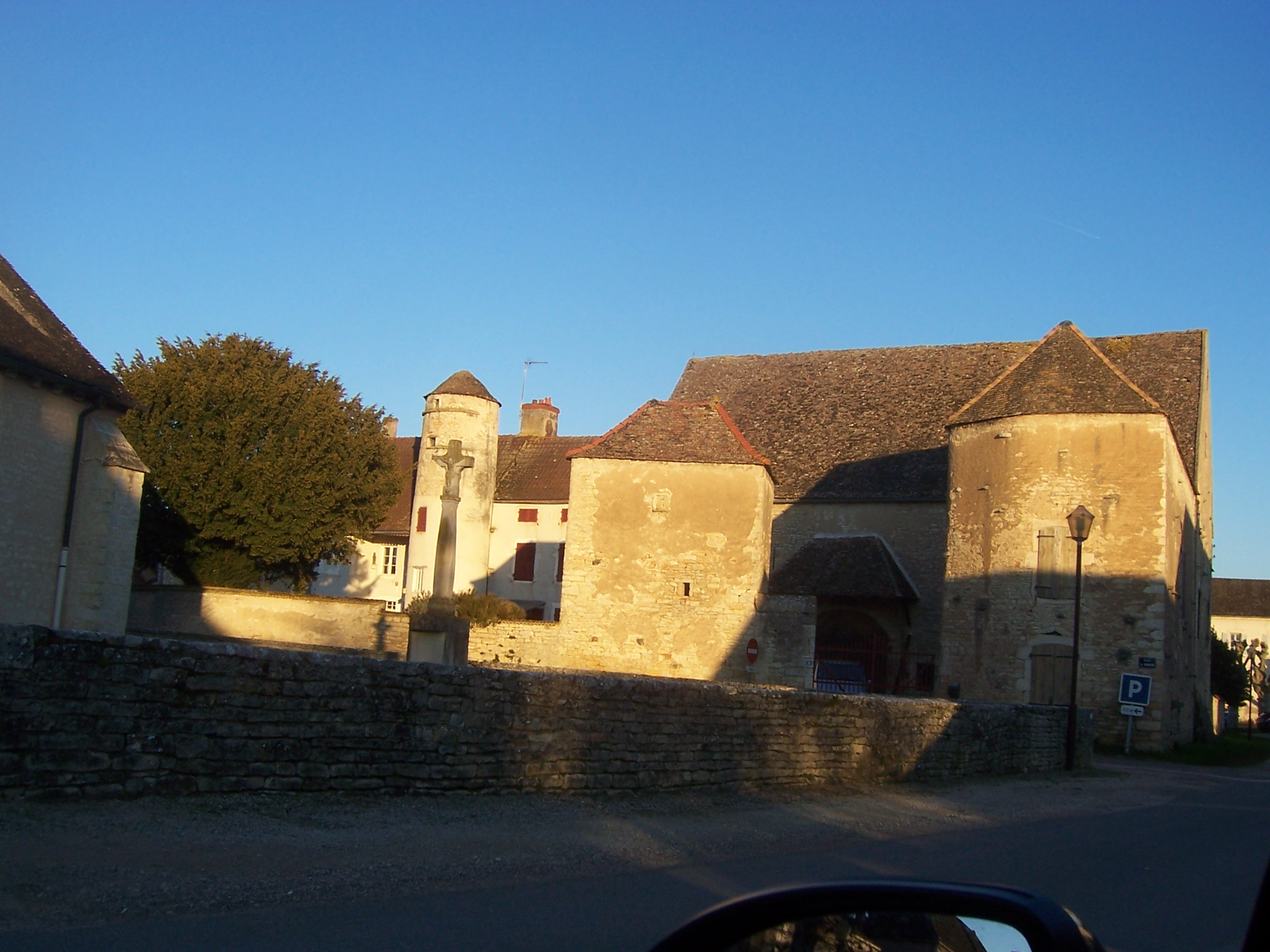
Near the church

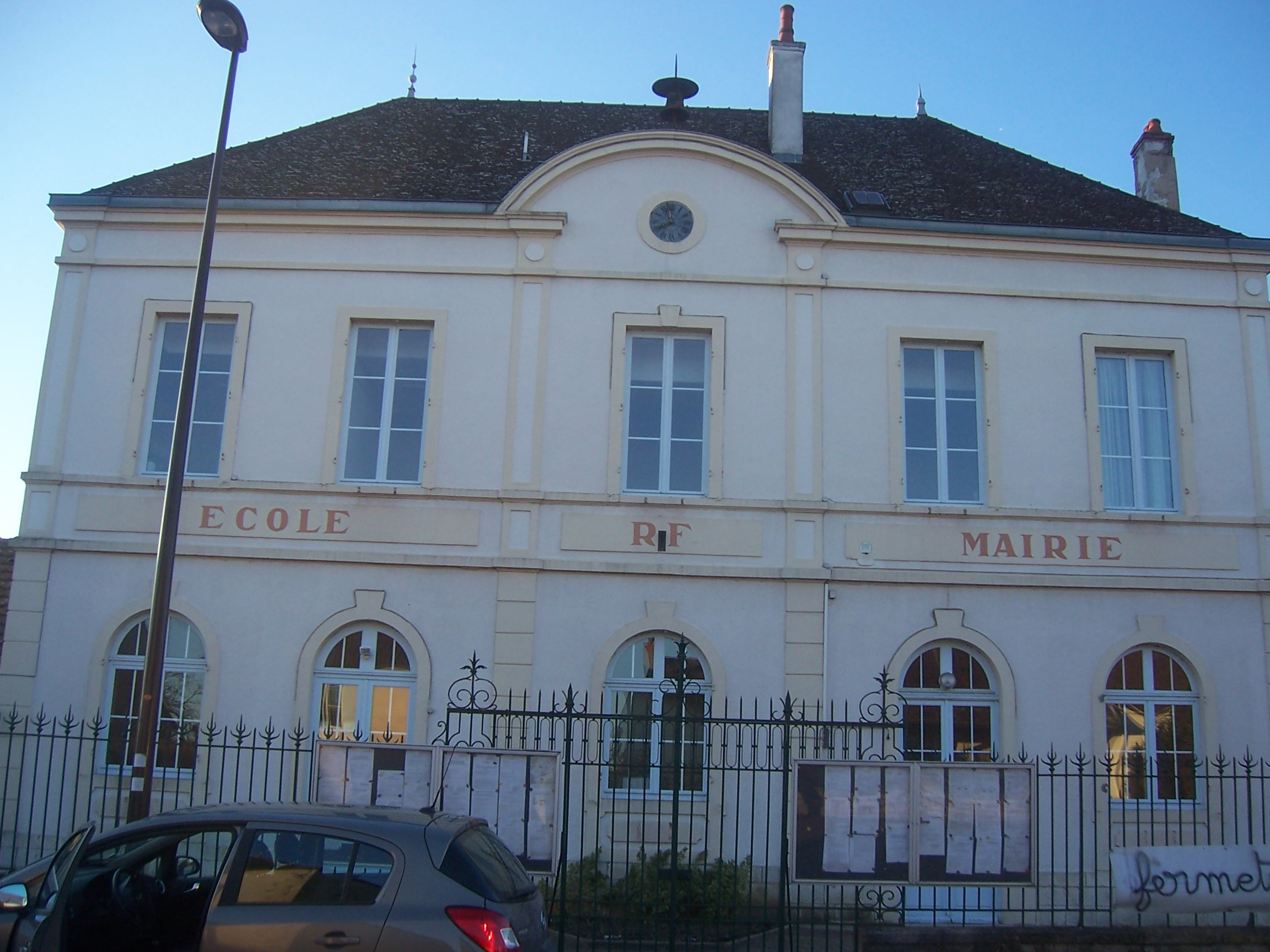
Town hall

== See also ==
- Communes of the Saône-et-Loire department
