= Saint-Sernin-du-Plain =

- Commune
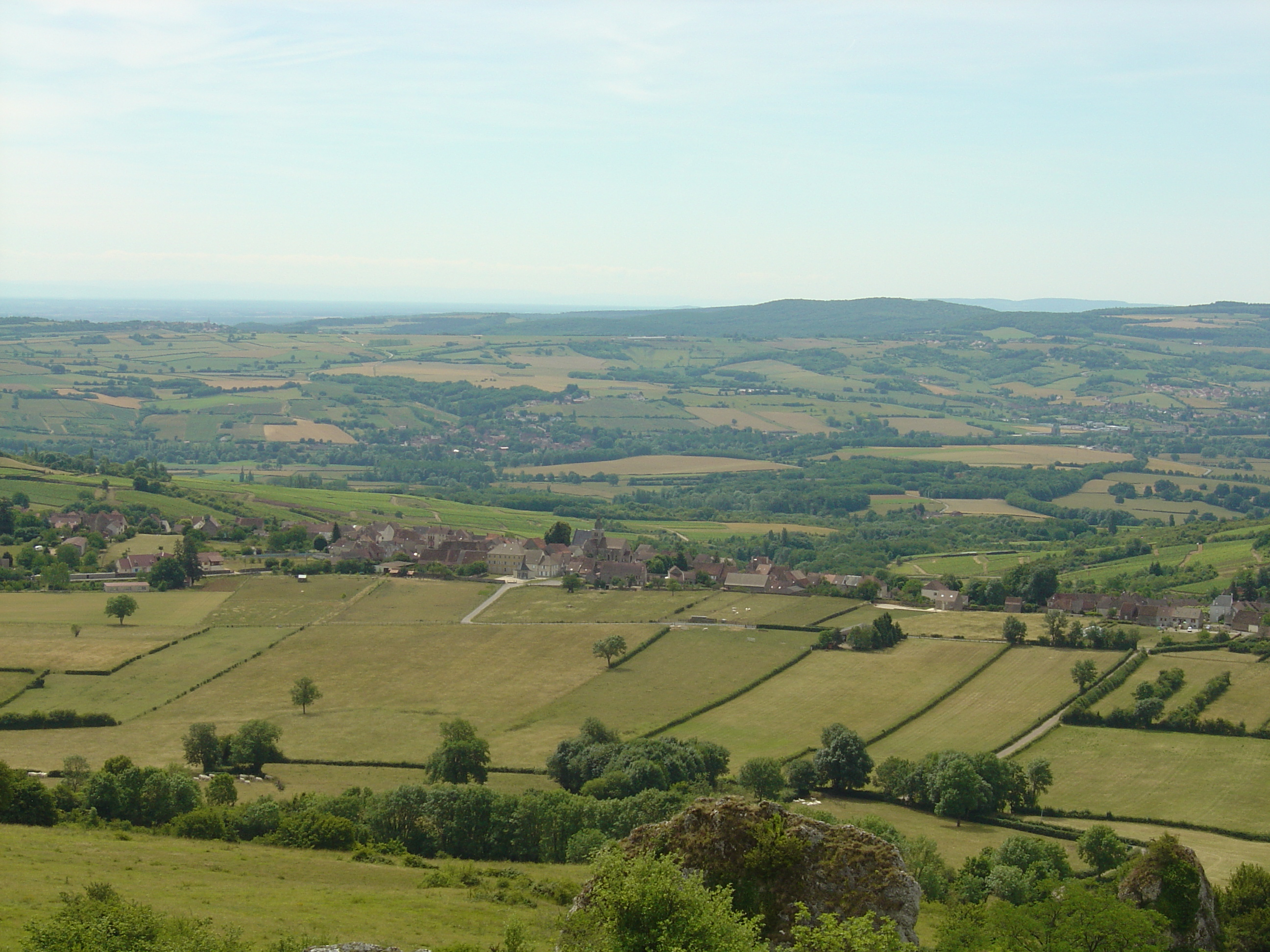
- A general view of Saint-Sernin-du-Plain

- Coat of arms
- Location of Saint-Sernin-du-Plain
- Location within France Location within Bourgogne-Franche-Comté
- Coordinates: 46°53′34″N 4°37′09″E
- Country: France
- Region: Bourgogne-Franche-Comté
- Department: Saône-et-Loire
- Arrondissement: Chalon-sur-Saône
- Canton: Chagny
- Intercommunality: CA Le Grand Chalon
- Area^{1}: 14.45 km^{2} (5.58 sq mi)
- Elevation: 400 m (1,300 ft)
- Highest elevation: 542 m (1,778 ft)
- Lowest elevation: 230 m (750 ft)
- Population (2023): 613
  - Density: 42.4/km^{2} (110/sq mi)
- Time zone: UTC+01:00 (CET)
  - Summer (DST): UTC+02:00 (CEST)
- INSEE/Postal code: 71480 /71510
- ^{1} French Land Register data, which excludes lakes, ponds, glaciers > 1 km^{2} (0.386 sq mi or 247 acres) and river estuaries.

Saint-Sernin-du-Plain (French pronunciation: [sɛ̃ sɛʁnɛ̃ dy plɛ̃]) is a commune in the Saône-et-Loire department in the region of Bourgogne-Franche-Comté in eastern France.

== See also ==
- Communes of the Saône-et-Loire department
