= Communauté d'agglomération Le Grand Chalon =

Le Grand Chalon
- Communauté d'agglomération
- Interactive map of Le Grand Chalon
- Coordinates: 46°47′N 04°51′E
- Country: France
- Region: Bourgogne-Franche-Comté
- Department: Saône-et-Loire
- No. of communes: {{{nbcomm}}}
- Established: 1994

Government
  - President: Sébastien Martin
- Area: 551.7 km^{2} (213.0 sq mi)
- Population (2017): 113,879
  - Density: 206.4/km^{2} (534.6/sq mi)
- Website: www.legrandchalon.fr

Communauté d'agglomération Le Grand Chalon is an intercommunal structure, centred on the city of Chalon-sur-Saône. It is located in the Saône-et-Loire department, in the Bourgogne-Franche-Comté region, eastern France. It was created in January 1994. Its seat is in Chalon-sur-Saône. Its area is 551.7 km^{2}. Its population was 113,879 in 2017, of which 45,096 in Chalon-sur-Saône proper.

== Composition ==
The communauté d'agglomération consists of the following 51 communes:

1. Allerey-sur-Saône
2. Aluze
3. Barizey
4. Bouzeron
5. Chalon-sur-Saône
6. Chamilly
7. Champforgeuil
8. La Charmée
9. Charrecey
10. Chassey-le-Camp
11. Châtenoy-en-Bresse
12. Châtenoy-le-Royal
13. Cheilly-lès-Maranges
14. Crissey
15. Demigny
16. Dennevy
17. Dracy-le-Fort
18. Épervans
19. Farges-lès-Chalon
20. Fontaines
21. Fragnes-la-Loyère
22. Gergy
23. Givry
24. Jambles
25. Lans
26. Lessard-le-National
27. Lux
28. Marnay
29. Mellecey
30. Mercurey
31. Oslon
32. Remigny
33. Rully
34. Saint-Bérain-sur-Dheune
35. Saint-Denis-de-Vaux
36. Saint-Désert
37. Saint-Gilles
38. Saint-Jean-de-Vaux
39. Saint-Léger-sur-Dheune
40. Saint-Loup-de-Varennes
41. Saint-Loup-Géanges
42. Saint-Marcel
43. Saint-Mard-de-Vaux
44. Saint-Martin-sous-Montaigu
45. Saint-Rémy
46. Saint-Sernin-du-Plain
47. Sampigny-lès-Maranges
48. Sassenay
49. Sevrey
50. Varennes-le-Grand
51. Virey-le-Grand
