= Aluze =

- Commune
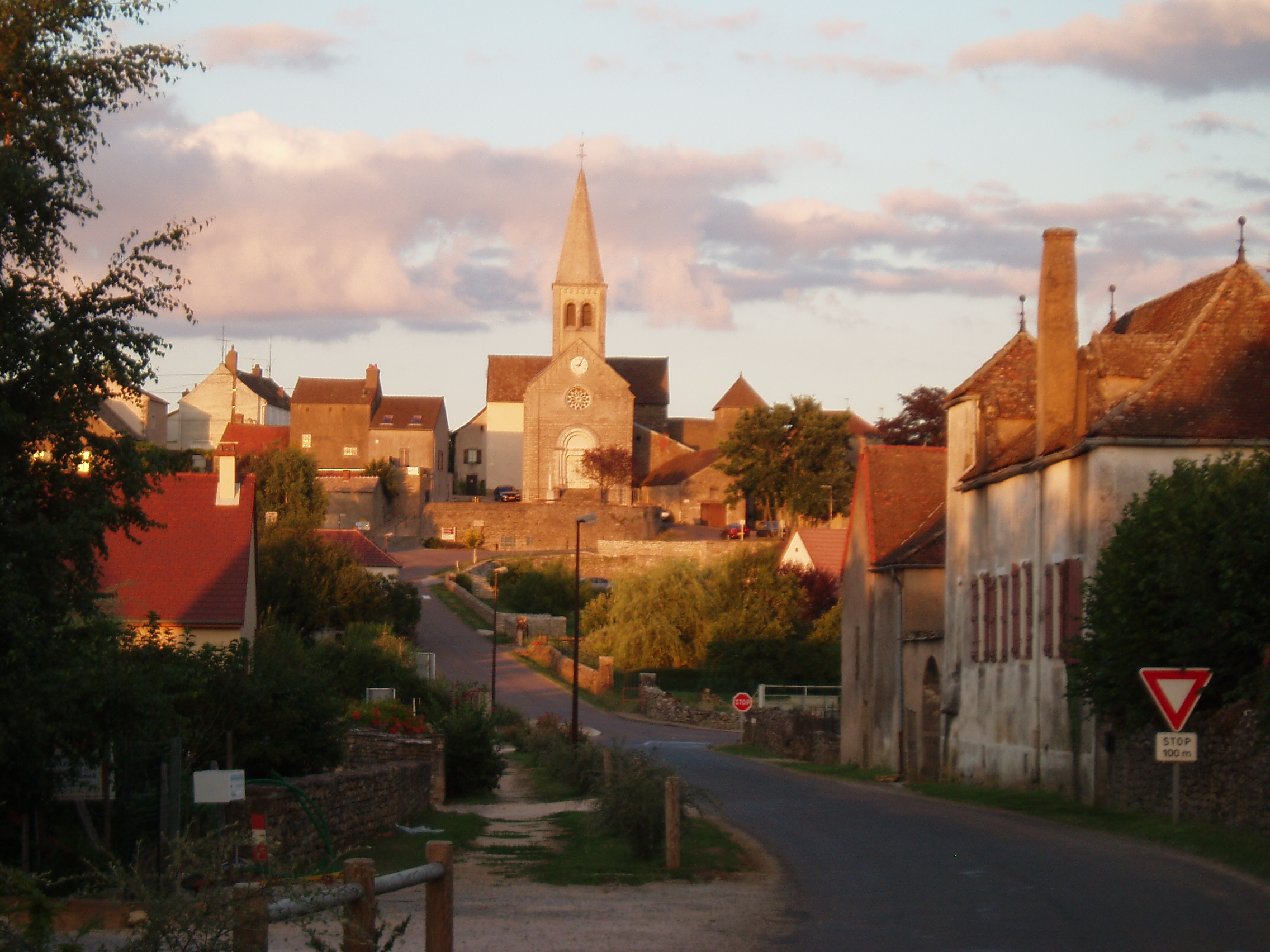
- Location of Aluze
- Location within France Location within Bourgogne-Franche-Comté
- Coordinates: 46°50′57″N 4°41′14″E
- Country: France
- Region: Bourgogne-Franche-Comté
- Department: Saône-et-Loire
- Arrondissement: Chalon-sur-Saône
- Canton: Chagny
- Intercommunality: CA Le Grand Chalon

Government
  - Mayor (2020–2026): Andrée Douheret
- Area^{1}: 6.01 km^{2} (2.32 sq mi)
- Elevation: 426 m (1,398 ft)
- Highest elevation: 405 m (1,329 ft)
- Lowest elevation: 260 m (850 ft)
- Population (2023): 255
  - Density: 42.4/km^{2} (110/sq mi)
- Time zone: UTC+01:00 (CET)
  - Summer (DST): UTC+02:00 (CEST)
- INSEE/Postal code: 71005 /71510
- ^{1} French Land Register data, which excludes lakes, ponds, glaciers > 1 km^{2} (0.386 sq mi or 247 acres) and river estuaries.

Aluze (French pronunciation: [alyz]) is a commune in the Saône-et-Loire department in the Bourgogne-Franche-Comté region in eastern France.

== Population ==
Historical population
Year	Pop.	±% p.a.
1968	151	—
1975	143	−0.77%
1982	180	+3.34%
1990	199	+1.26%
1999	217	+0.97%
2007	244	+1.48%
2012	240	−0.33%
2017	251	+0.90%
2023	255	+0.26%
Source: INSEE

== See also ==
- Communes of the Saône-et-Loire department
