= Chamilly =

- Commune
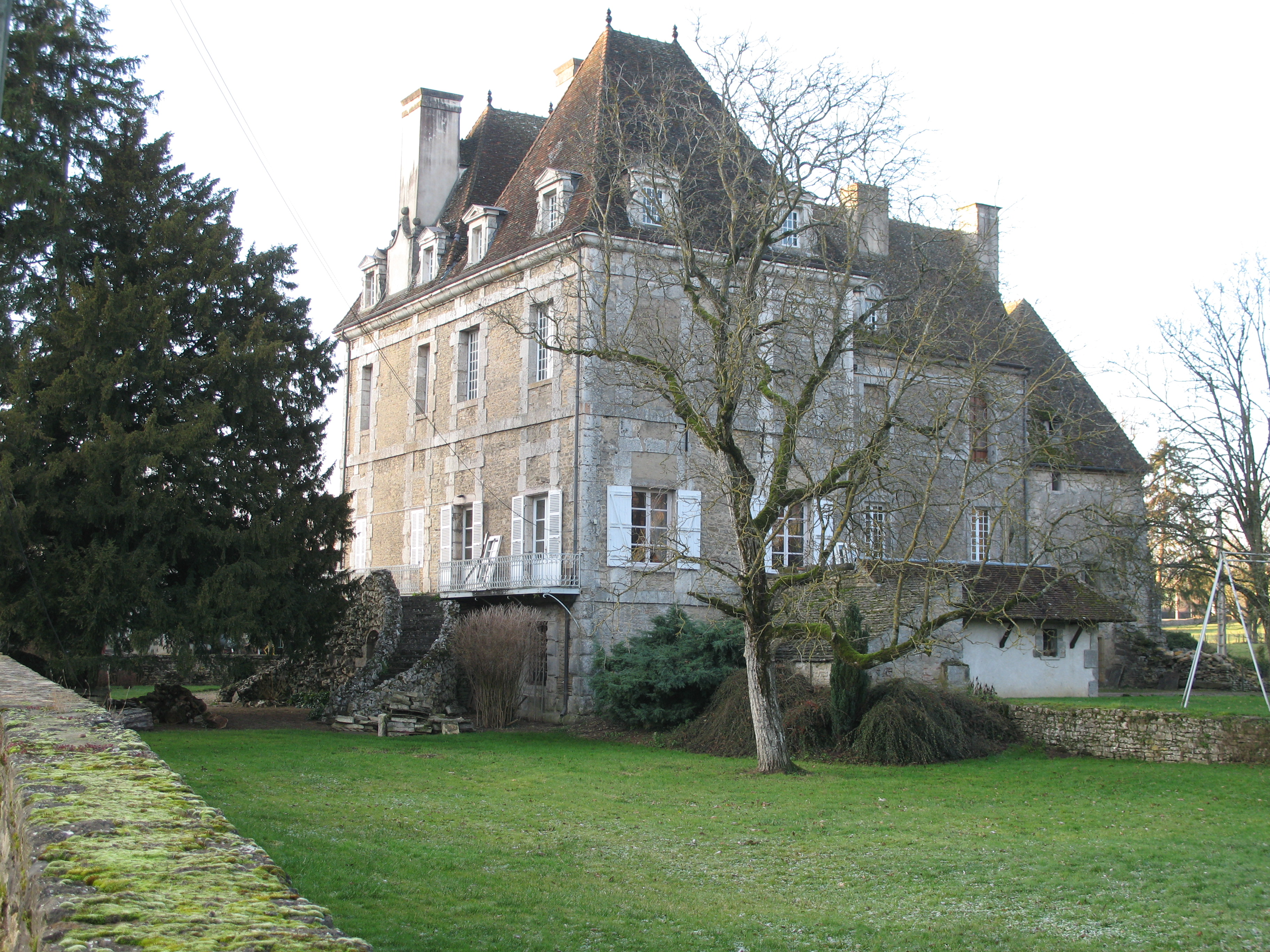
- The chateau in Chamilly

- Coat of arms
- Location of Chamilly
- Location within France Location within Bourgogne-Franche-Comté
- Coordinates: 46°52′06″N 4°41′05″E
- Country: France
- Region: Bourgogne-Franche-Comté
- Department: Saône-et-Loire
- Arrondissement: Chalon-sur-Saône
- Canton: Chagny
- Intercommunality: CA Le Grand Chalon
- Area^{1}: 4.7 km^{2} (1.8 sq mi)
- Elevation: 336 m (1,102 ft)
- Highest elevation: 451 m (1,480 ft)
- Lowest elevation: 304 m (997 ft)
- Population (2023): 146
  - Density: 31/km^{2} (80/sq mi)
- Time zone: UTC+01:00 (CET)
  - Summer (DST): UTC+02:00 (CEST)
- INSEE/Postal code: 71078 /71510
- ^{1} French Land Register data, which excludes lakes, ponds, glaciers > 1 km^{2} (0.386 sq mi or 247 acres) and river estuaries.

Chamilly is a commune in the Saône-et-Loire department in the region of Bourgogne-Franche-Comté in eastern France.

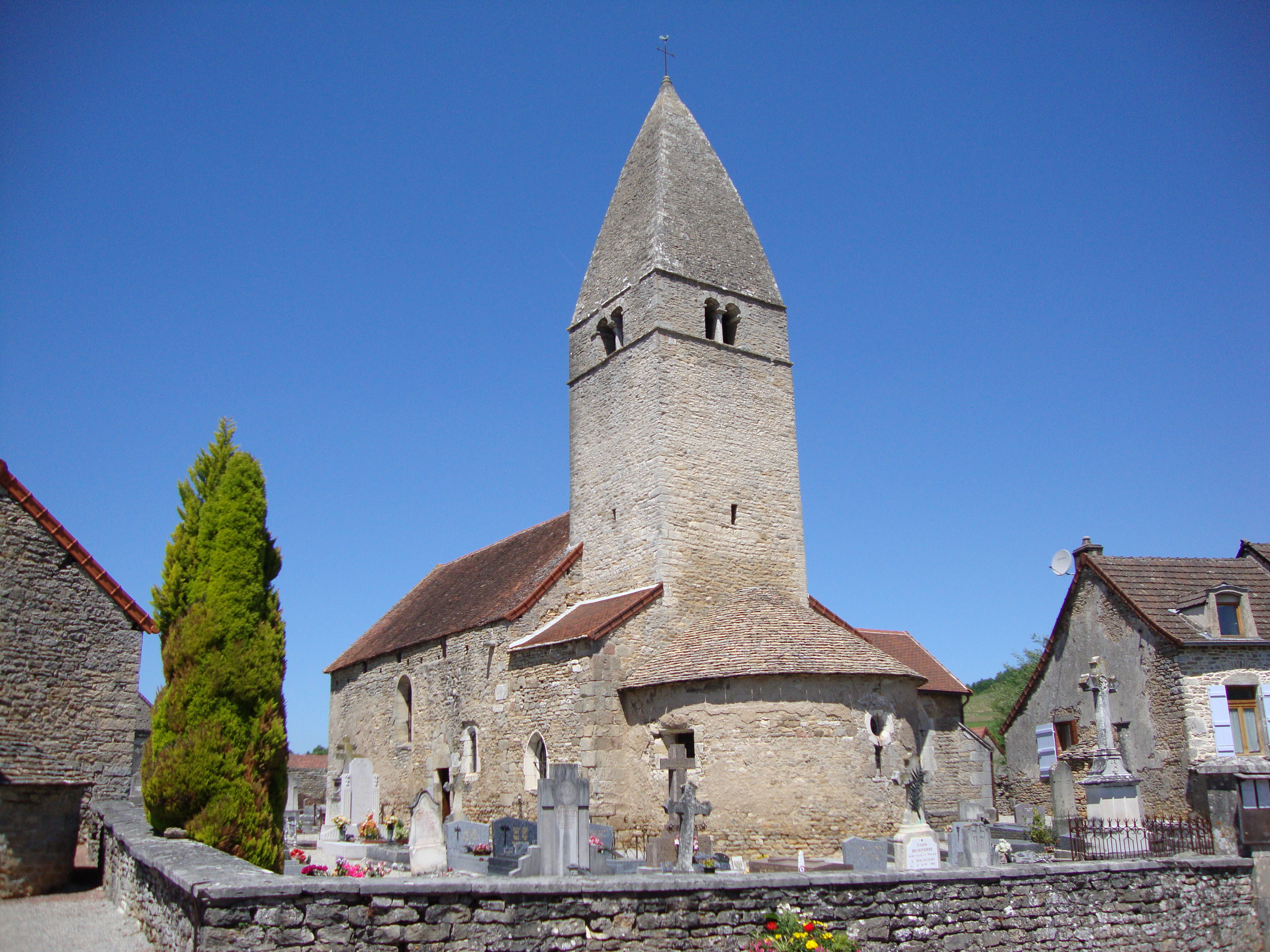
Church

== See also ==
- Communes of the Saône-et-Loire department
