= Charrecey =

- Commune
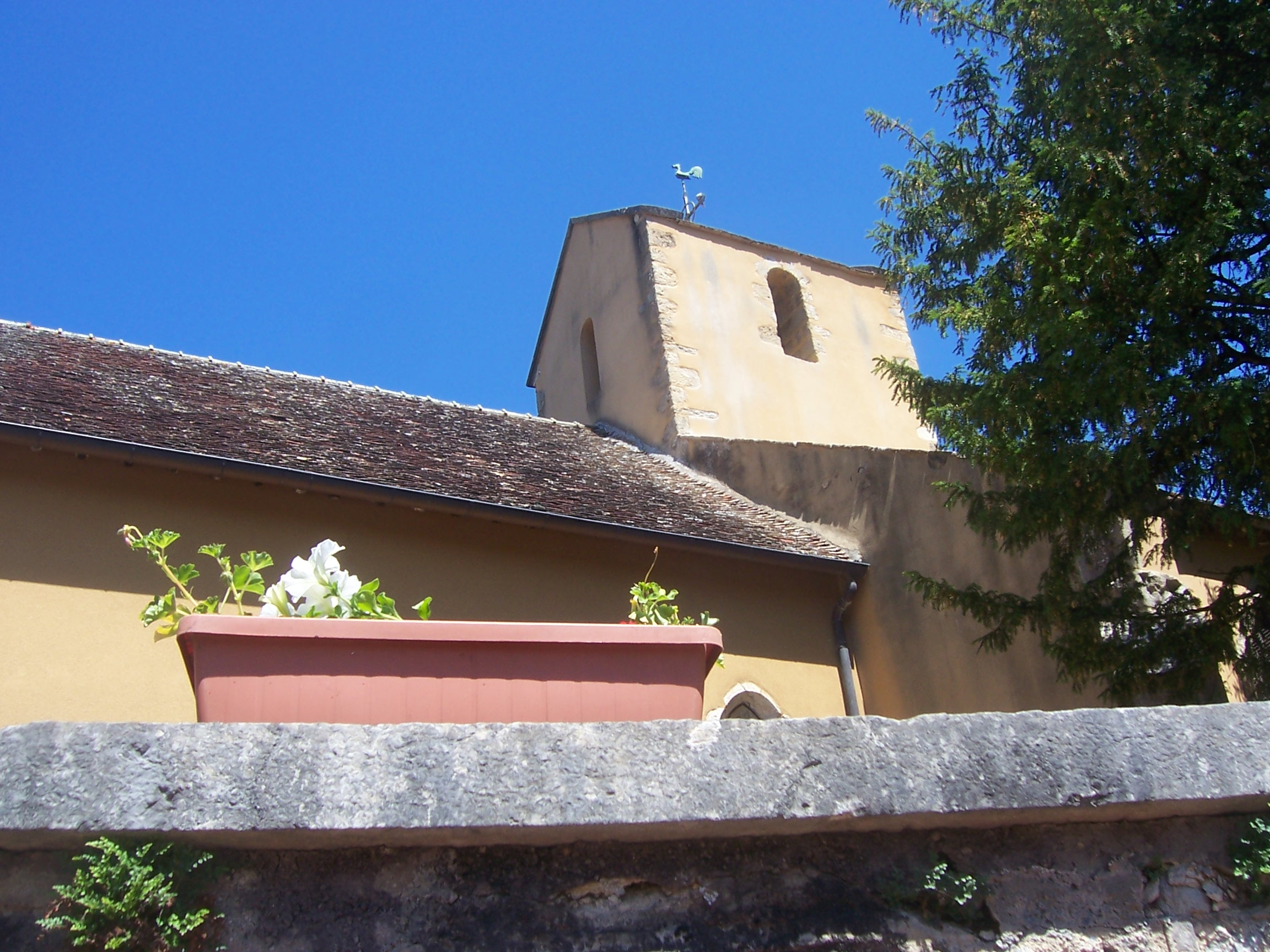
- The church in Charrecey

- Coat of arms
- Location of Charrecey
- Location within France Location within Bourgogne-Franche-Comté
- Coordinates: 46°50′23″N 4°40′03″E
- Country: France
- Region: Bourgogne-Franche-Comté
- Department: Saône-et-Loire
- Arrondissement: Chalon-sur-Saône
- Canton: Chagny
- Intercommunality: CA Le Grand Chalon
- Area^{1}: 5.48 km^{2} (2.12 sq mi)
- Elevation: 385 m (1,263 ft)
- Highest elevation: 455 m (1,493 ft)
- Lowest elevation: 290 m (950 ft)
- Population (2023): 324
  - Density: 59.1/km^{2} (153/sq mi)
- Time zone: UTC+01:00 (CET)
  - Summer (DST): UTC+02:00 (CEST)
- INSEE/Postal code: 71107 /71510
- ^{1} French Land Register data, which excludes lakes, ponds, glaciers > 1 km^{2} (0.386 sq mi or 247 acres) and river estuaries.

Charrecey (French pronunciation: [ʃaʁsɛ]) is a commune in the Saône-et-Loire department in the region of Bourgogne-Franche-Comté in eastern France.

== See also ==
- Communes of the Saône-et-Loire department
