= Dennevy =

- Commune
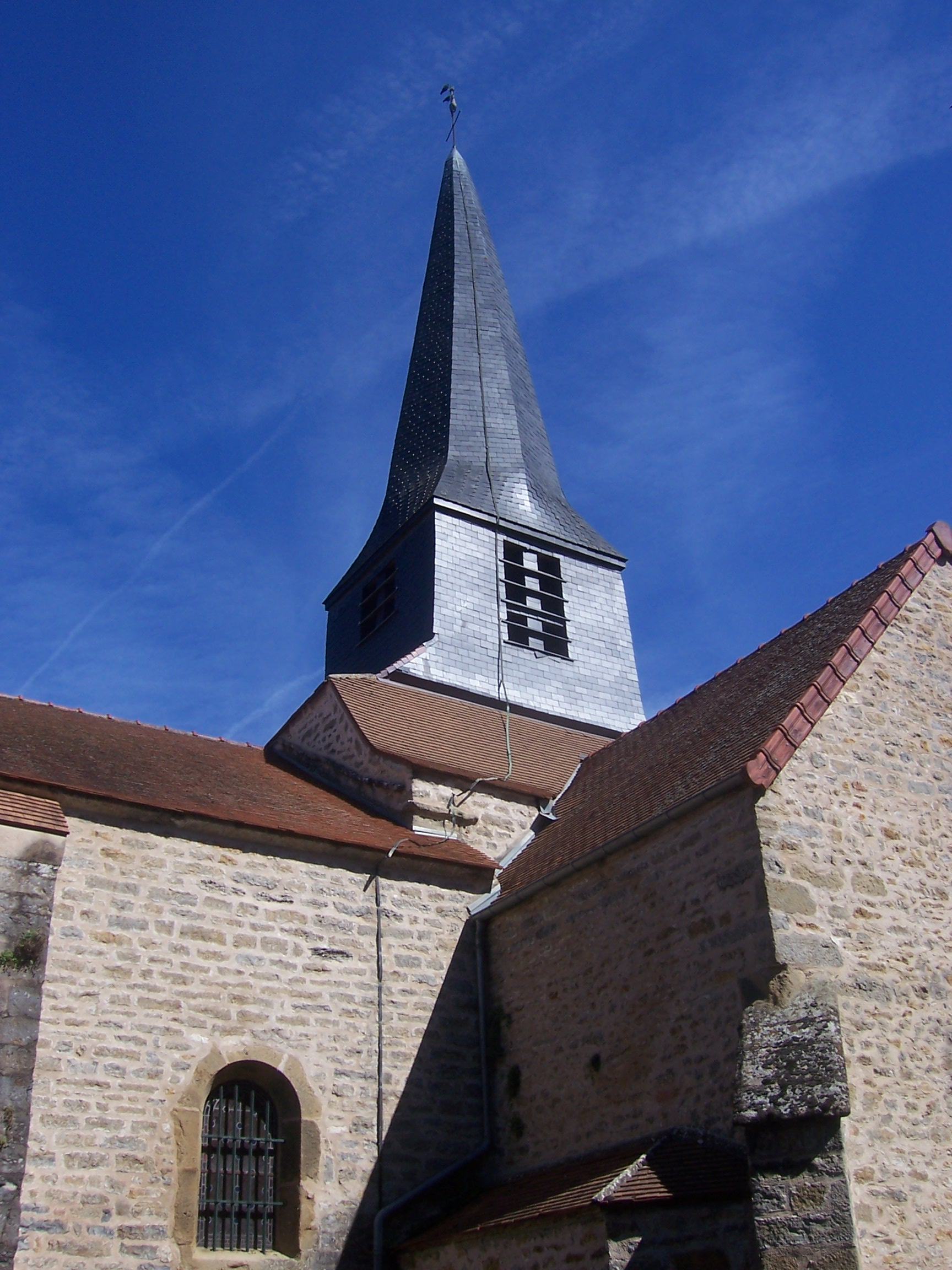
- The church in Dennevy
- Location of Dennevy
- Location within France Location within Bourgogne-Franche-Comté
- Coordinates: 46°51′59″N 4°39′00″E
- Country: France
- Region: Bourgogne-Franche-Comté
- Department: Saône-et-Loire
- Arrondissement: Chalon-sur-Saône
- Canton: Chagny
- Intercommunality: CA Le Grand Chalon

Government
  - Mayor (2020–2026): Christophe Perrin
- Area^{1}: 4.62 km^{2} (1.78 sq mi)
- Elevation: 250 m (820 ft)
- Highest elevation: 337 m (1,106 ft)
- Lowest elevation: 223 m (732 ft)
- Population (2023): 296
  - Density: 64.1/km^{2} (166/sq mi)
- Time zone: UTC+01:00 (CET)
  - Summer (DST): UTC+02:00 (CEST)
- INSEE/Postal code: 71171 /71510
- ^{1} French Land Register data, which excludes lakes, ponds, glaciers > 1 km^{2} (0.386 sq mi or 247 acres) and river estuaries.

Dennevy (French pronunciation: [dɛnvi]) is a commune in the Saône-et-Loire department in the region of Bourgogne-Franche-Comté in eastern France.

== See also ==
- Communes of the Saône-et-Loire department
