= Chagny, Saône-et-Loire =

Chagny
- Commune
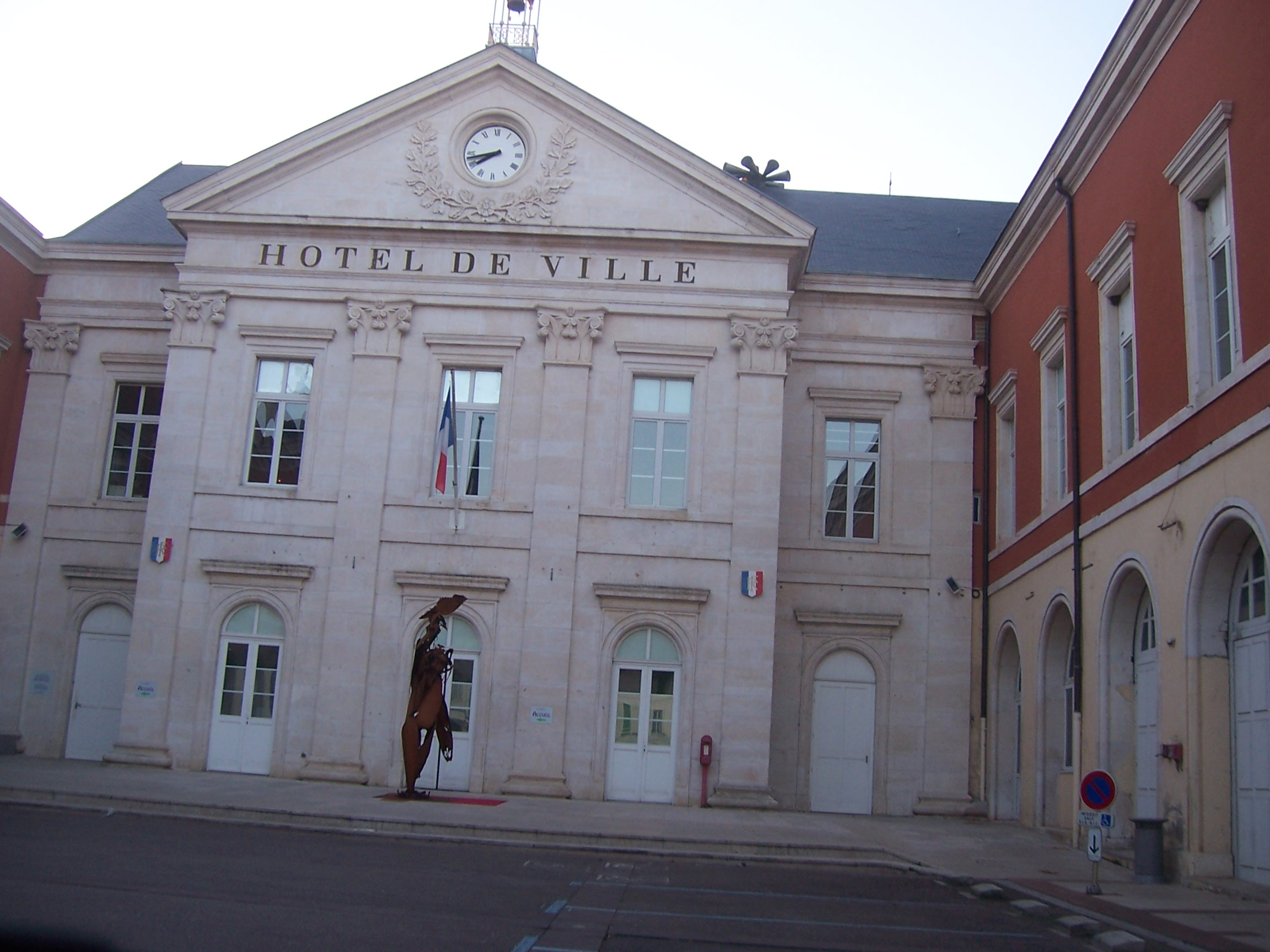
- Town hall

- Coat of arms
- Location of Chagny
- Location within France Location within Bourgogne-Franche-Comté
- Coordinates: 46°54′41″N 4°45′15″E
- Country: France
- Region: Bourgogne-Franche-Comté
- Department: Saône-et-Loire
- Arrondissement: Chalon-sur-Saône
- Canton: Chagny
- Intercommunality: CA Beaune Côte et Sud

Government
  - Mayor (2026–32): Sébastien Laurent
- Area^{1}: 18.9 km^{2} (7.3 sq mi)
- Elevation: 216 m (709 ft)
- Highest elevation: 315 m (1,033 ft)
- Lowest elevation: 201 m (659 ft)
- Population (2023): 5,350
  - Density: 283/km^{2} (733/sq mi)
- Time zone: UTC+01:00 (CET)
  - Summer (DST): UTC+02:00 (CEST)
- INSEE/Postal code: 71073 /71150
- ^{1} French Land Register data, which excludes lakes, ponds, glaciers > 1 km^{2} (0.386 sq mi or 247 acres) and river estuaries.

Chagny (French pronunciation: [ʃaɲi]) is a commune in the Saône-et-Loire department in the region of Bourgogne-Franche-Comté in eastern France.

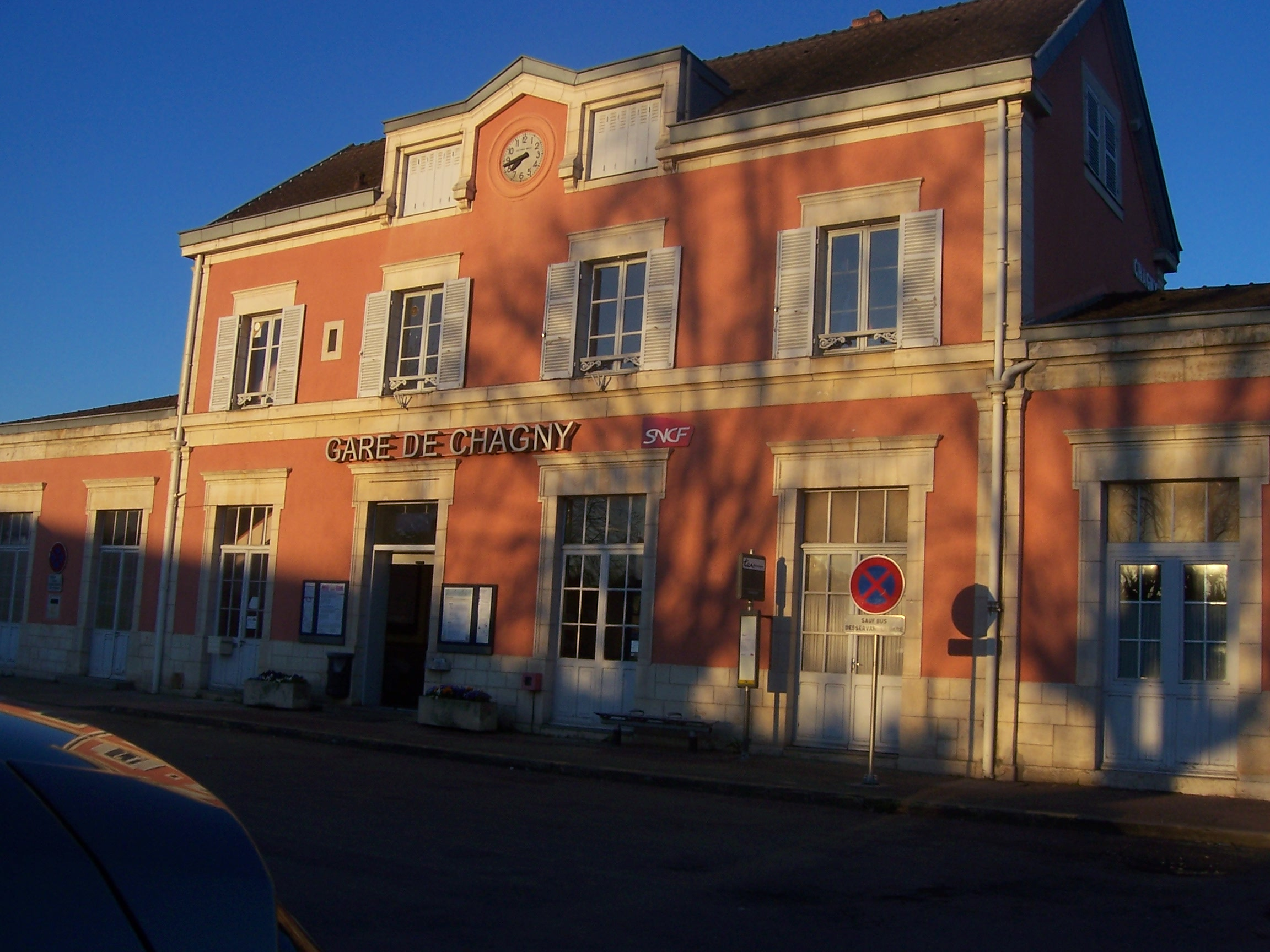
Train station

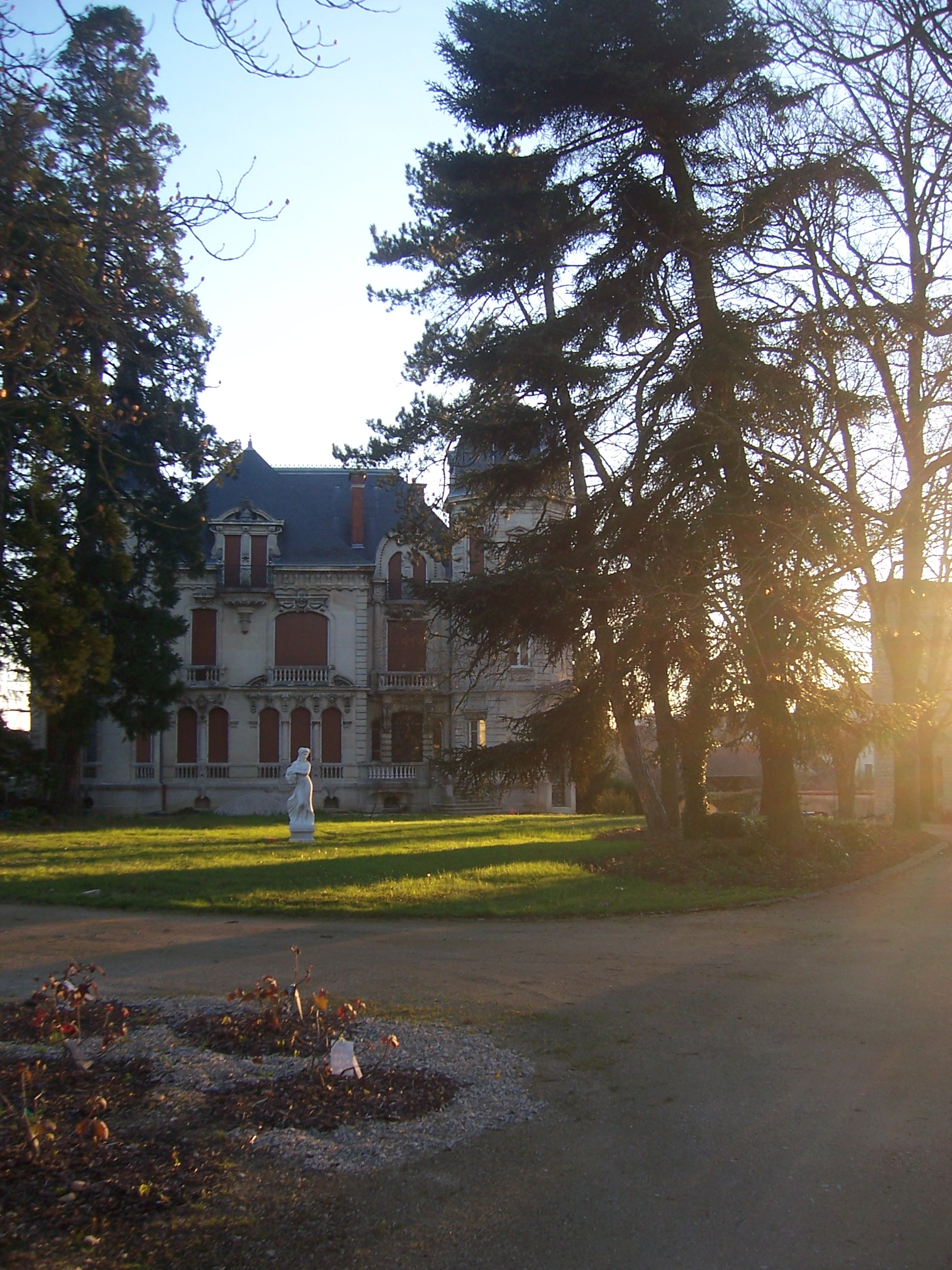
Chateau Diot

== Population ==
Historical population
Year	Pop.	±% p.a.
1968	5,205	—
1975	5,661	+1.21%
1982	5,339	−0.83%
1990	5,346	+0.02%
1999	5,591	+0.50%
2007	5,391	−0.45%
2012	5,657	+0.97%
2017	5,543	−0.41%
2023	5,350	−0.59%
Source: INSEE

== International relations ==
Chagny is twinned with Letchworth in Hertfordshire, England.

== See also ==
- Communes of the Saône-et-Loire department
- Côte Chalonnaise
