= Remigny, Saône-et-Loire =

Remigny
- Commune
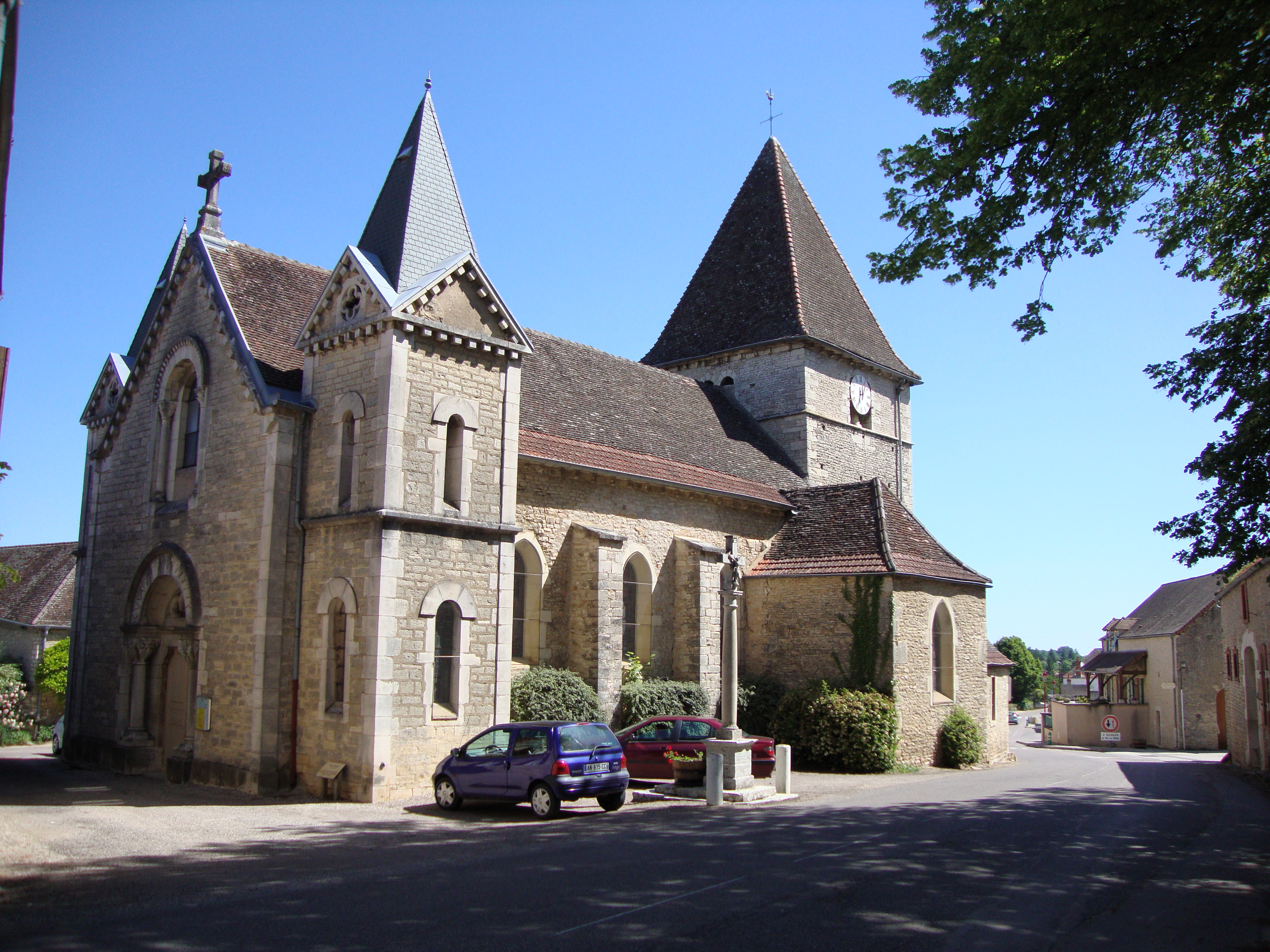
- The church in Remigny
- Location of Remigny
- Location within France Location within Bourgogne-Franche-Comté
- Coordinates: 46°54′33″N 4°43′25″E
- Country: France
- Region: Bourgogne-Franche-Comté
- Department: Saône-et-Loire
- Arrondissement: Chalon-sur-Saône
- Canton: Chagny
- Intercommunality: CA Le Grand Chalon
- Area^{1}: 2.45 km^{2} (0.95 sq mi)
- Elevation: 215 m (705 ft)
- Highest elevation: 340 m (1,120 ft)
- Lowest elevation: 208 m (682 ft)
- Population (2023): 404
  - Density: 165/km^{2} (427/sq mi)
- Time zone: UTC+01:00 (CET)
  - Summer (DST): UTC+02:00 (CEST)
- INSEE/Postal code: 71369 /71150
- ^{1} French Land Register data, which excludes lakes, ponds, glaciers > 1 km^{2} (0.386 sq mi or 247 acres) and river estuaries.

Remigny is a commune in the Saône-et-Loire department in the region of Bourgogne-Franche-Comté in eastern France.

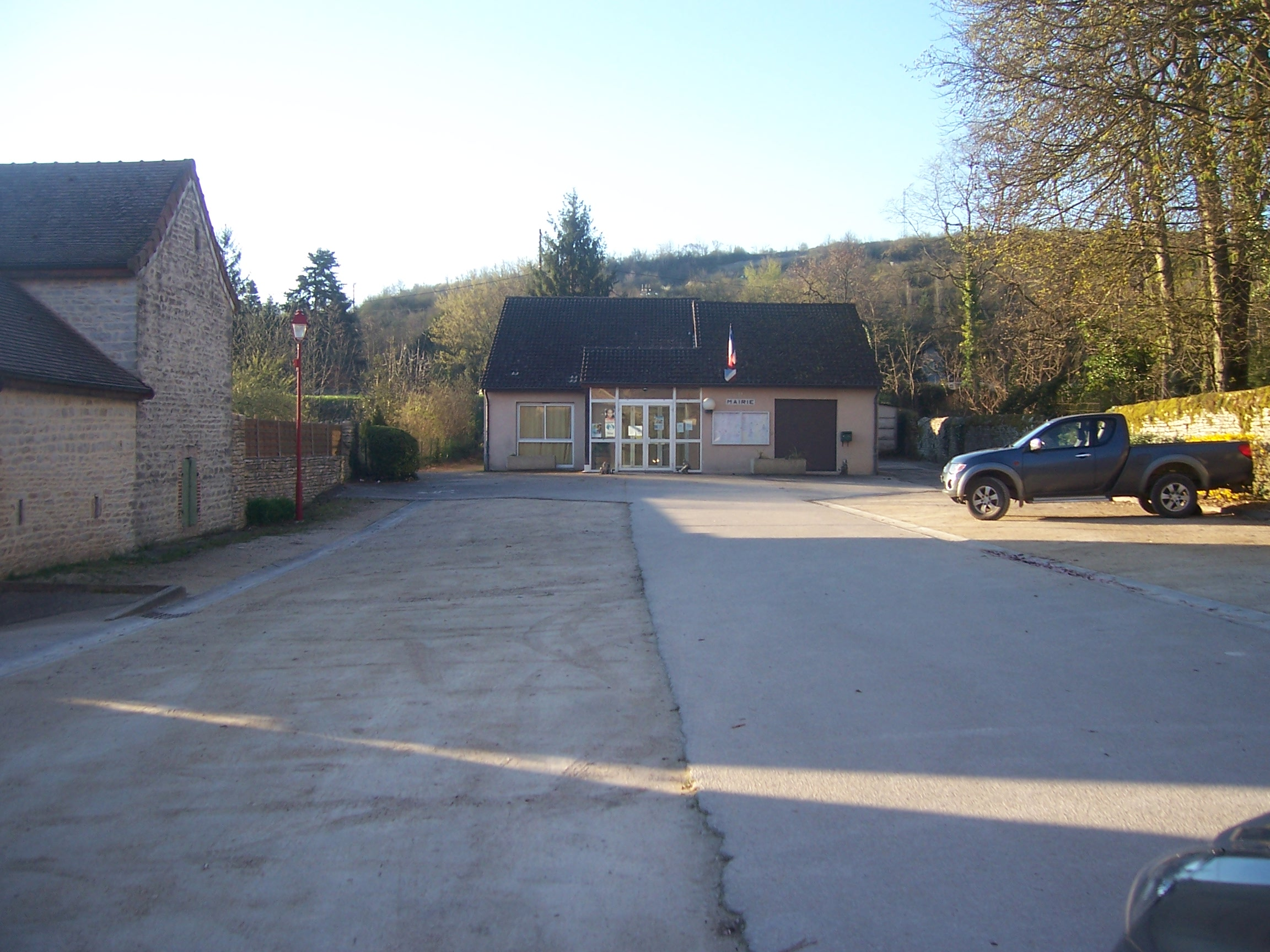
Town hall

== Wine ==
There are vineyards within the commune of Remigny which are part of the appellations Chassagne-Montrachet and Santenay, which are named after two neighbouring communes.(There is no Remigny appellation.)

== See also ==
- Communes of the Saône-et-Loire department
