= Saint-Jean-de-Trézy =

- Commune
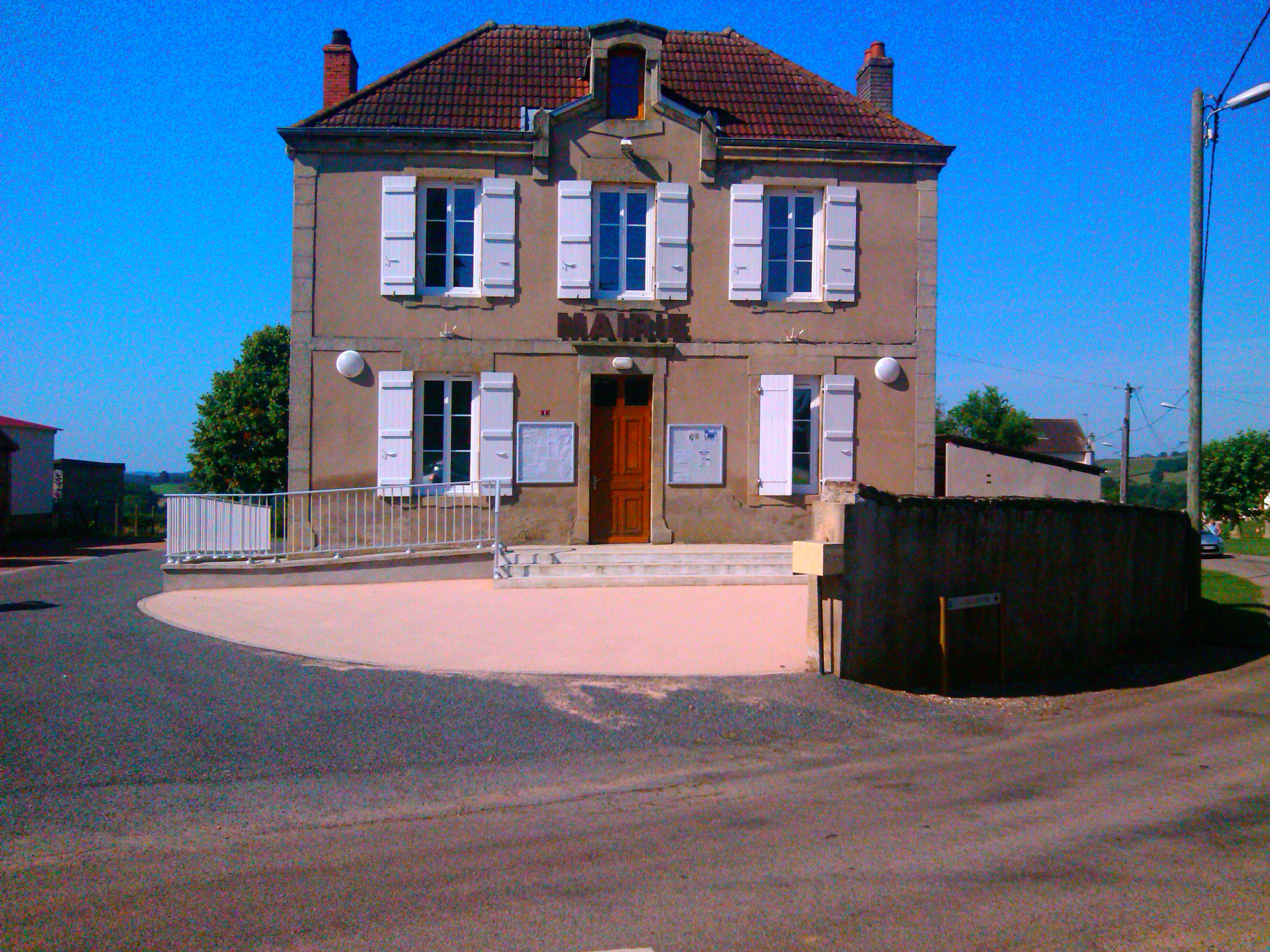
- Town hall
- Location of Saint-Jean-de-Trézy
- Location within France Location within Bourgogne-Franche-Comté
- Coordinates: 46°50′13″N 4°35′17″E
- Country: France
- Region: Bourgogne-Franche-Comté
- Department: Saône-et-Loire
- Arrondissement: Autun
- Canton: Chagny
- Area^{1}: 11.1 km^{2} (4.3 sq mi)
- Elevation: 270 m (890 ft)
- Highest elevation: 390 m (1,280 ft)
- Lowest elevation: 233 m (764 ft)
- Population (2023): 372
  - Density: 33.5/km^{2} (86.8/sq mi)
- Time zone: UTC+01:00 (CET)
  - Summer (DST): UTC+02:00 (CEST)
- INSEE/Postal code: 71431 /71490
- ^{1} French Land Register data, which excludes lakes, ponds, glaciers > 1 km^{2} (0.386 sq mi or 247 acres) and river estuaries.

Saint-Jean-de-Trézy (French pronunciation: [sɛ̃ ʒɑ̃ də tʁezi]) is a commune in the Saône-et-Loire department in the region of Bourgogne-Franche-Comté in eastern France.

== See also ==
- Communes of the Saône-et-Loire department
