= Paris-l'Hôpital =

- Commune
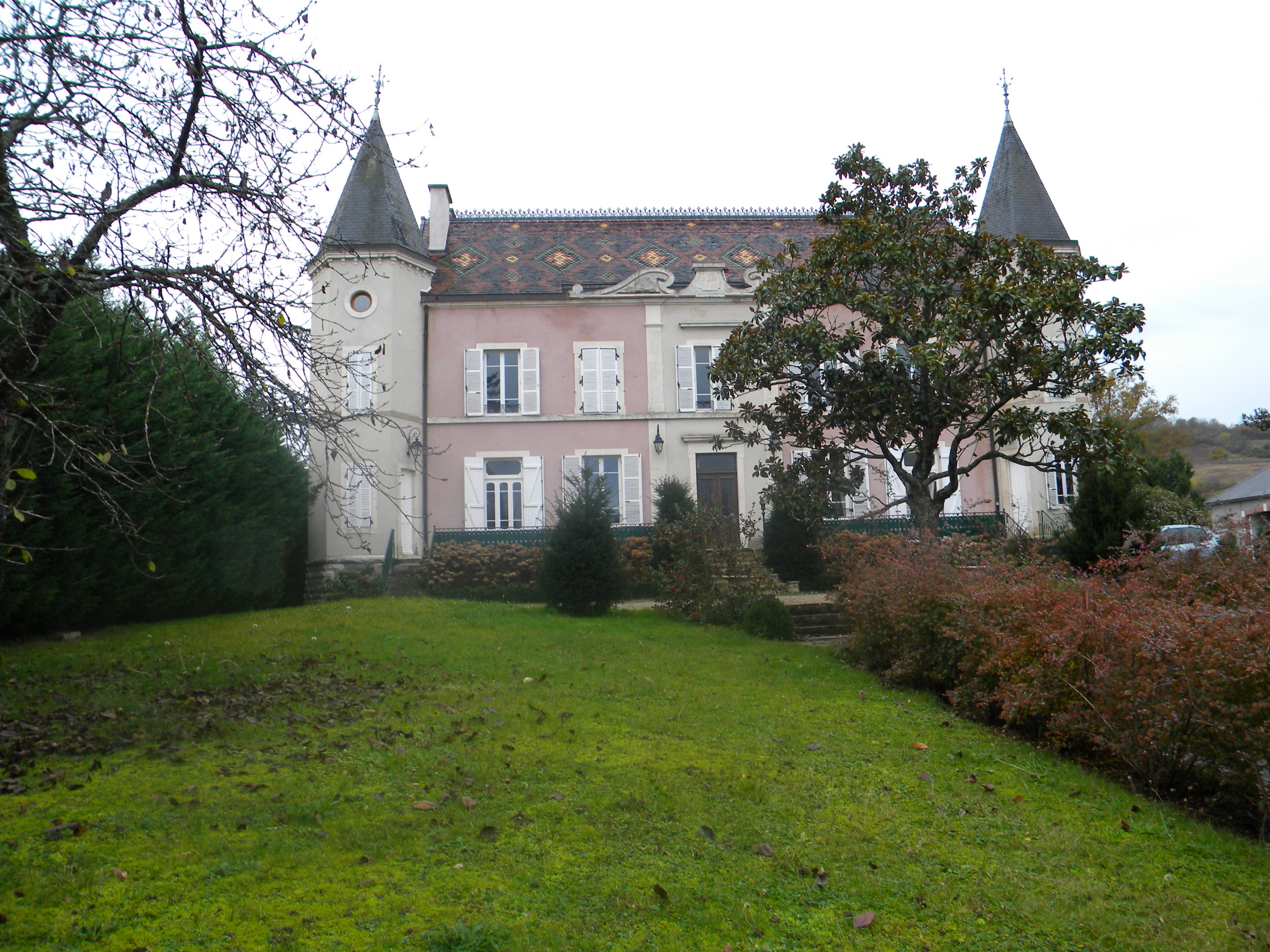
- Chateau

- Coat of arms
- Location of Paris-l'Hôpital
- Location within France Location within Bourgogne-Franche-Comté
- Coordinates: 46°54′54″N 4°38′10″E
- Country: France
- Region: Bourgogne-Franche-Comté
- Department: Saône-et-Loire
- Arrondissement: Chalon-sur-Saône
- Canton: Chagny
- Intercommunality: CA Beaune Côte et Sud
- Area^{1}: 2.74 km^{2} (1.06 sq mi)
- Elevation: 280 m (920 ft)
- Highest elevation: 398 m (1,306 ft)
- Lowest elevation: 245 m (804 ft)
- Population (2023): 285
  - Density: 104/km^{2} (269/sq mi)
- Time zone: UTC+01:00 (CET)
  - Summer (DST): UTC+02:00 (CEST)
- INSEE/Postal code: 71343 /71150
- ^{1} French Land Register data, which excludes lakes, ponds, glaciers > 1 km^{2} (0.386 sq mi or 247 acres) and river estuaries.

Paris-l'Hôpital (French pronunciation: [paʁi lopital]) is a commune in the Saône-et-Loire department in the region of Bourgogne-Franche-Comté in eastern France.

== See also ==
- Communes of the Saône-et-Loire department
