= Dracy-lès-Couches =

- Commune
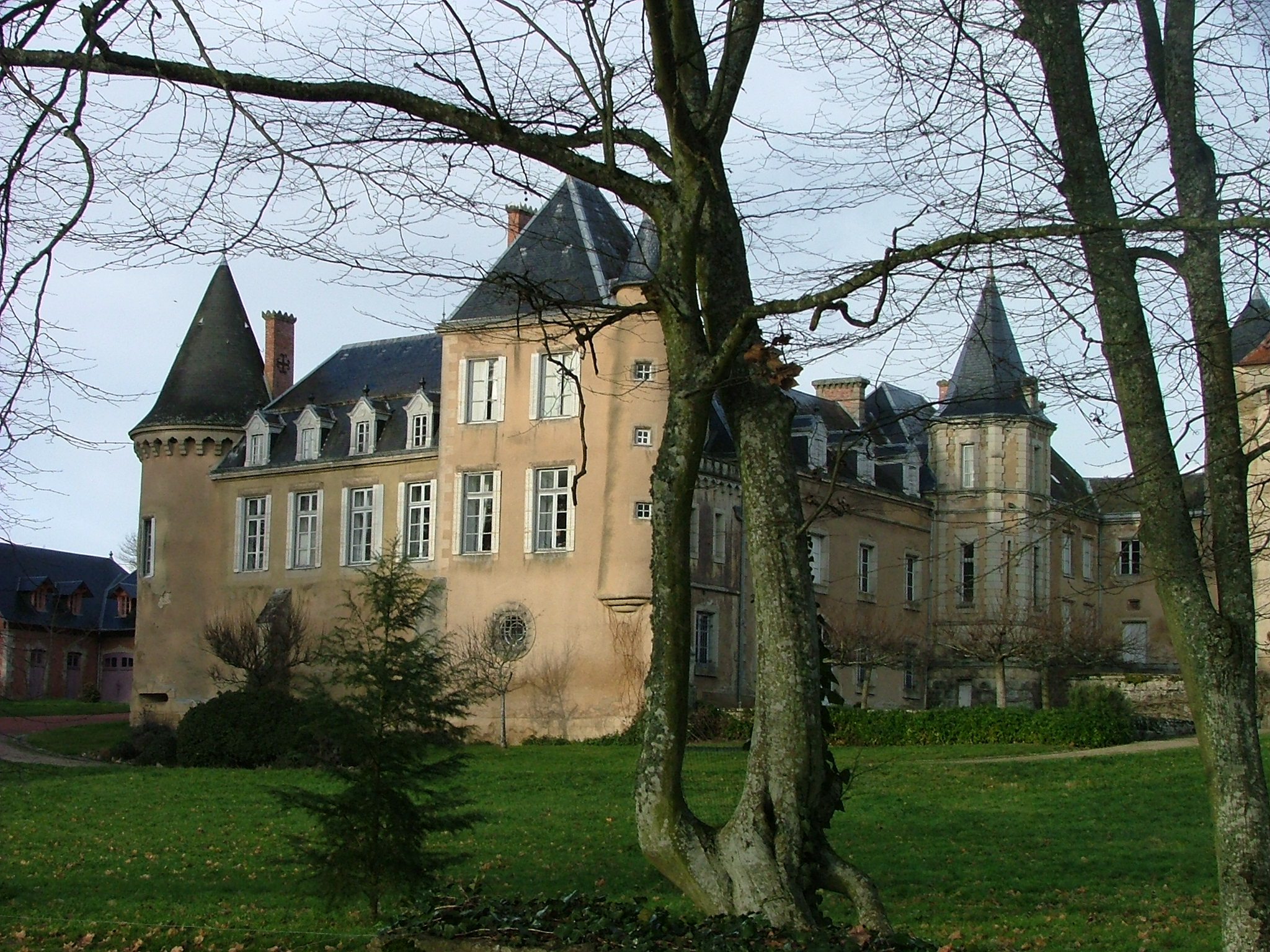
- Chateau
- Location of Dracy-lès-Couches
- Location within France Location within Bourgogne-Franche-Comté
- Coordinates: 46°53′21″N 4°34′37″E
- Country: France
- Region: Bourgogne-Franche-Comté
- Department: Saône-et-Loire
- Arrondissement: Autun
- Canton: Chagny

Government
  - Mayor (2021–2026): Magali Paulin
- Area^{1}: 8.27 km^{2} (3.19 sq mi)
- Elevation: 350 m (1,150 ft)
- Highest elevation: 448 m (1,470 ft)
- Lowest elevation: 285 m (935 ft)
- Population (2023): 152
  - Density: 18.4/km^{2} (47.6/sq mi)
- Time zone: UTC+01:00 (CET)
  - Summer (DST): UTC+02:00 (CEST)
- INSEE/Postal code: 71183 /71490
- ^{1} French Land Register data, which excludes lakes, ponds, glaciers > 1 km^{2} (0.386 sq mi or 247 acres) and river estuaries.

Dracy-lès-Couches (French pronunciation: [dʁasi lɛ kuʃ], literally Dracy near Couches) is a commune in the Saône-et-Loire department in the region of Bourgogne-Franche-Comté in eastern France.

Situated in rolling hills covered by vineyards and pastures, the village is home to an impressive chateau. In 2009, the village remodeled the marie and library. To allow for better access, the entrance to the building was moved from the rear to the side facing the parking lot. As of October 2009, the only store was a boulangerie.

== See also ==
- Communes of the Saône-et-Loire department
