= Perreuil =

- Commune
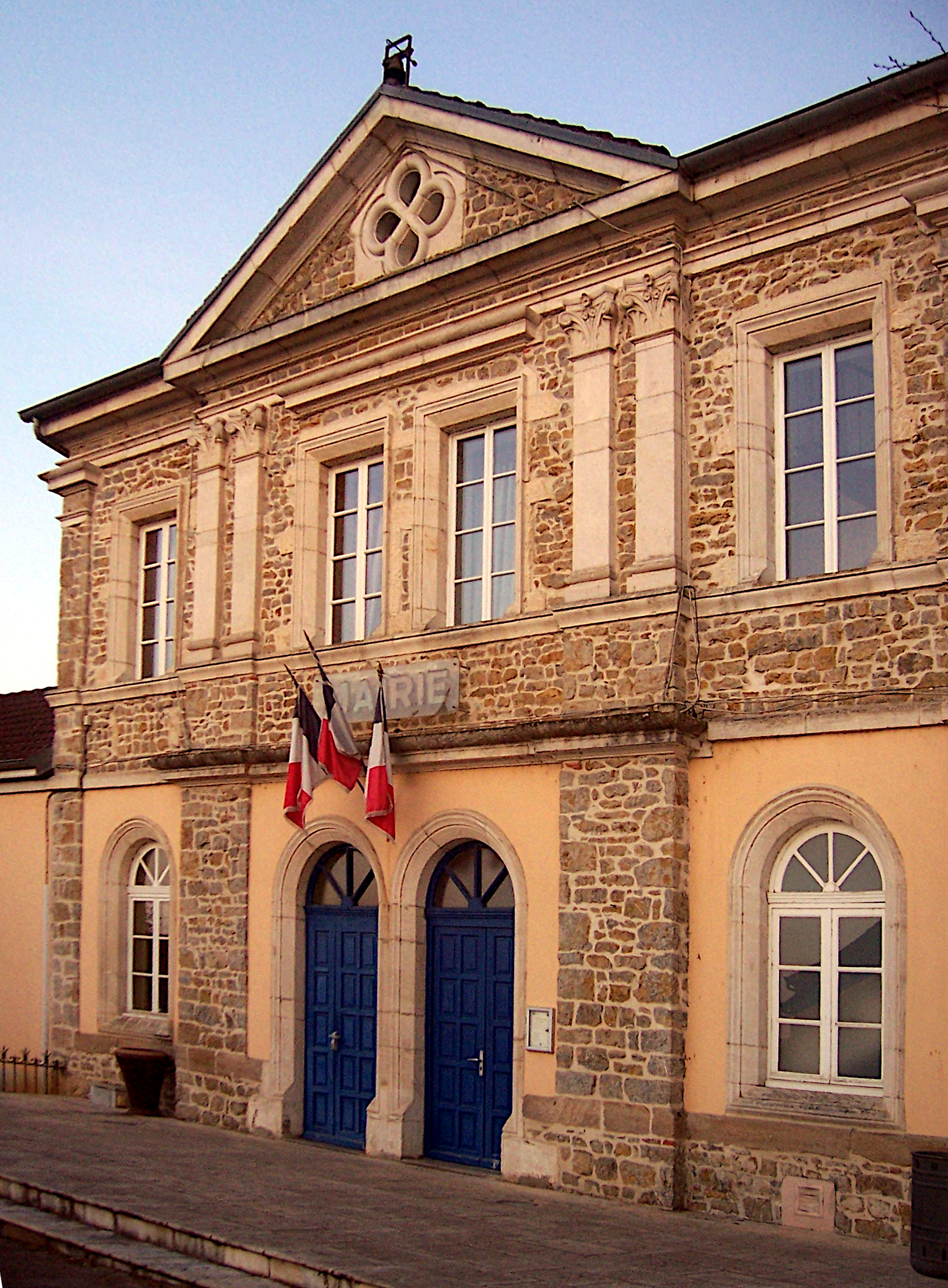
- Town hall
- Location of Perreuil
- Location within France Location within Bourgogne-Franche-Comté
- Coordinates: 46°49′11″N 4°34′08″E
- Country: France
- Region: Bourgogne-Franche-Comté
- Department: Saône-et-Loire
- Arrondissement: Autun
- Canton: Chagny
- Intercommunality: CU Creusot Montceau
- Area^{1}: 9.16 km^{2} (3.54 sq mi)
- Elevation: 251 m (823 ft)
- Highest elevation: 327 m (1,073 ft)
- Lowest elevation: 242 m (794 ft)
- Population (2023): 550
  - Density: 60/km^{2} (160/sq mi)
- Time zone: UTC+01:00 (CET)
  - Summer (DST): UTC+02:00 (CEST)
- INSEE/Postal code: 71347 /71510
- ^{1} French Land Register data, which excludes lakes, ponds, glaciers > 1 km^{2} (0.386 sq mi or 247 acres) and river estuaries.

Perreuil (French pronunciation: [pɛʁœj]) is a commune in the Saône-et-Loire department in the region of Bourgogne-Franche-Comté in eastern France.

== See also ==
- Communes of the Saône-et-Loire department
