= Canton of Chagny =

Coordinates: 46.91°N 4.75°E

The canton of Chagny is an administrative division of the Saône-et-Loire department, eastern France. Its borders were modified at the French canton reorganisation which came into effect in March 2015. Its seat is in Chagny.

It consists of the following communes:

1. Aluze
2. Bouzeron
3. Chagny
4. Chamilly
5. Change
6. Charrecey
7. Chassey-le-Camp
8. Chaudenay
9. Cheilly-lès-Maranges
10. Couches
11. Dennevy
12. Dezize-lès-Maranges
13. Dracy-lès-Couches
14. Essertenne
15. Fontaines
16. Morey
17. Paris-l'Hôpital
18. Perreuil
19. Remigny
20. Rully
21. Saint-Bérain-sur-Dheune
22. Saint-Gilles
23. Saint-Jean-de-Trézy
24. Saint-Léger-sur-Dheune
25. Saint-Maurice-lès-Couches
26. Saint-Sernin-du-Plain
27. Sampigny-lès-Maranges
