= Change, Saône-et-Loire =

Change
- Commune
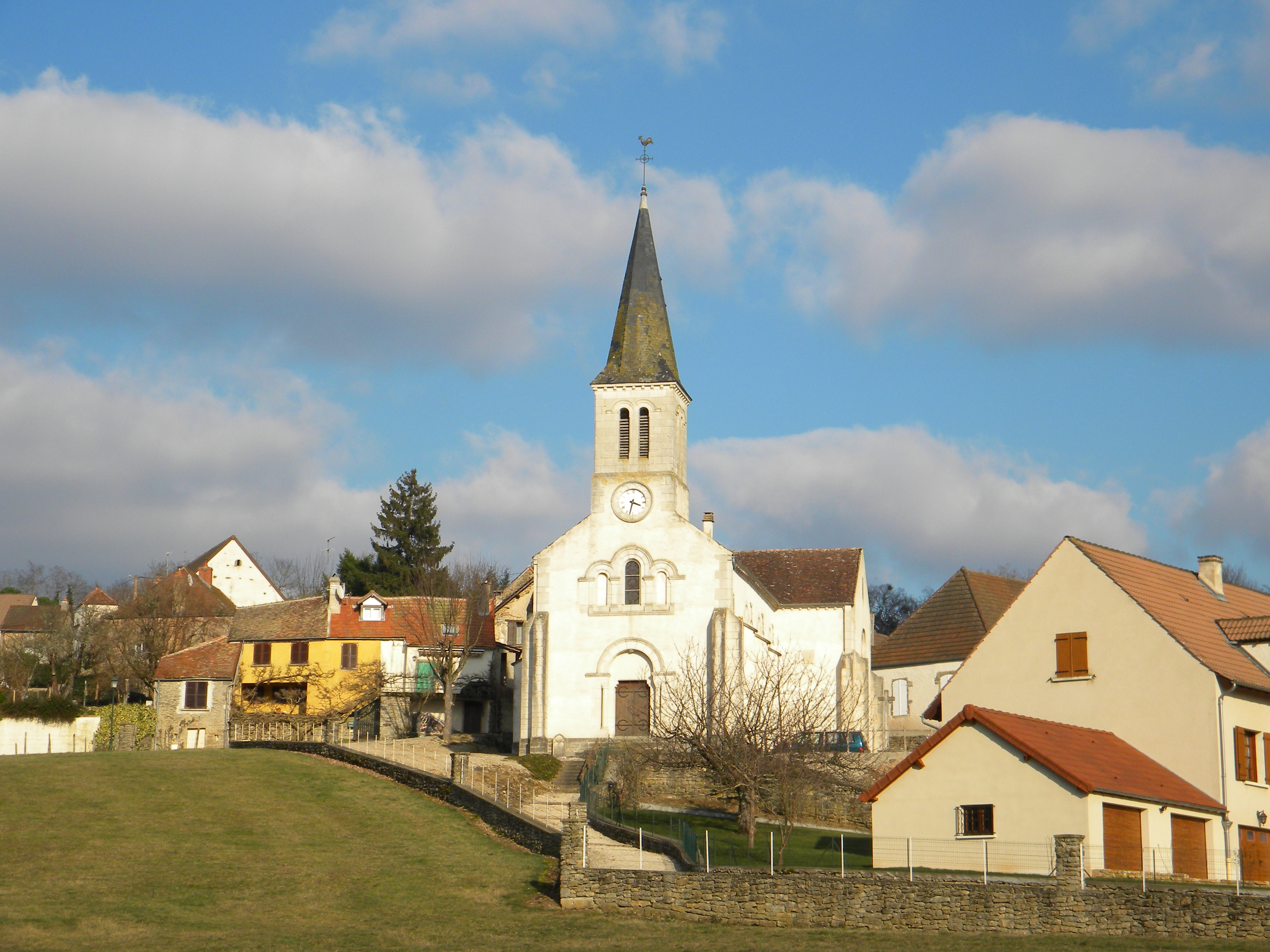
- The church in Change

- Coat of arms
- Location of Change
- Location within France Location within Bourgogne-Franche-Comté
- Coordinates: 46°55′50″N 4°38′06″E
- Country: France
- Region: Bourgogne-Franche-Comté
- Department: Saône-et-Loire
- Arrondissement: Chalon-sur-Saône
- Canton: Chagny
- Intercommunality: CA Beaune Côte et Sud
- Area^{1}: 6.56 km^{2} (2.53 sq mi)
- Elevation: 295 m (968 ft)
- Highest elevation: 513 m (1,683 ft)
- Lowest elevation: 274 m (899 ft)
- Population (2023): 217
  - Density: 33.1/km^{2} (85.7/sq mi)
- Time zone: UTC+01:00 (CET)
  - Summer (DST): UTC+02:00 (CEST)
- INSEE/Postal code: 71085 /21340
- ^{1} French Land Register data, which excludes lakes, ponds, glaciers > 1 km^{2} (0.386 sq mi or 247 acres) and river estuaries.

Change (French pronunciation: [ʃɑ̃ʒ]) is a commune in the Saône-et-Loire department in the region of Bourgogne-Franche-Comté in eastern France.

== See also ==
- Communes of the Saône-et-Loire department
