= Saint-Gilles, Saône-et-Loire =

Saint-Gilles
- Commune
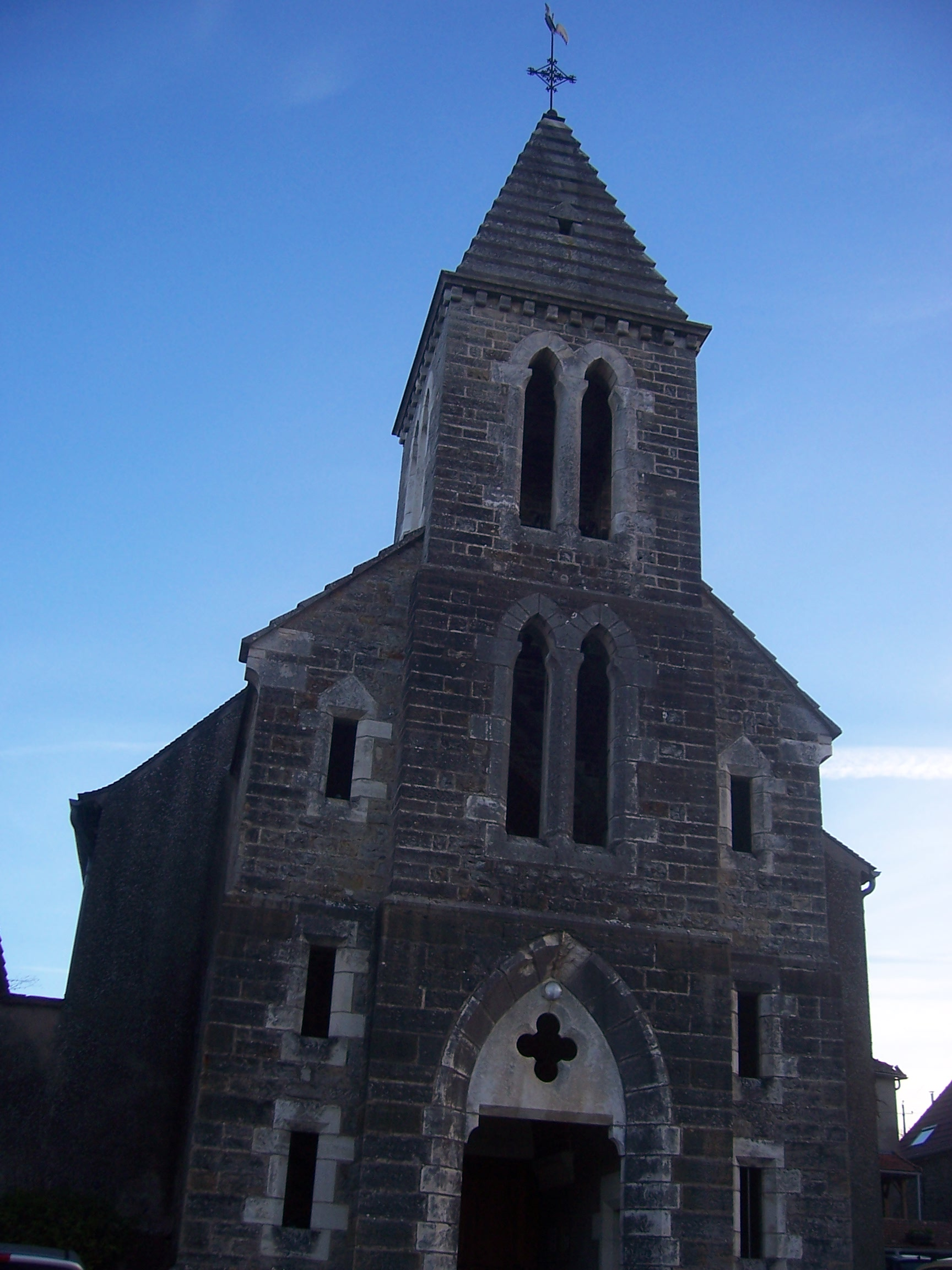
- The church in Saint-Gilles

- Coat of arms
- Location of Saint-Gilles
- Location within France Location within Bourgogne-Franche-Comté
- Coordinates: 46°52′36″N 4°40′03″E
- Country: France
- Region: Bourgogne-Franche-Comté
- Department: Saône-et-Loire
- Arrondissement: Chalon-sur-Saône
- Canton: Chagny
- Intercommunality: CA Le Grand Chalon
- Area^{1}: 3.64 km^{2} (1.41 sq mi)
- Elevation: 230 m (750 ft)
- Highest elevation: 410 m (1,350 ft)
- Lowest elevation: 220 m (720 ft)
- Population (2023): 286
  - Density: 78.6/km^{2} (203/sq mi)
- Time zone: UTC+01:00 (CET)
  - Summer (DST): UTC+02:00 (CEST)
- INSEE/Postal code: 71425 /71510
- ^{1} French Land Register data, which excludes lakes, ponds, glaciers > 1 km^{2} (0.386 sq mi or 247 acres) and river estuaries.

Saint-Gilles (French pronunciation: [sɛ̃ ʒil]) is a commune in the Saône-et-Loire department in the region of Bourgogne-Franche-Comté in eastern France.

== See also ==
- Communes of the Saône-et-Loire department
