= Fontaines, Saône-et-Loire =

Fontaines
- Commune
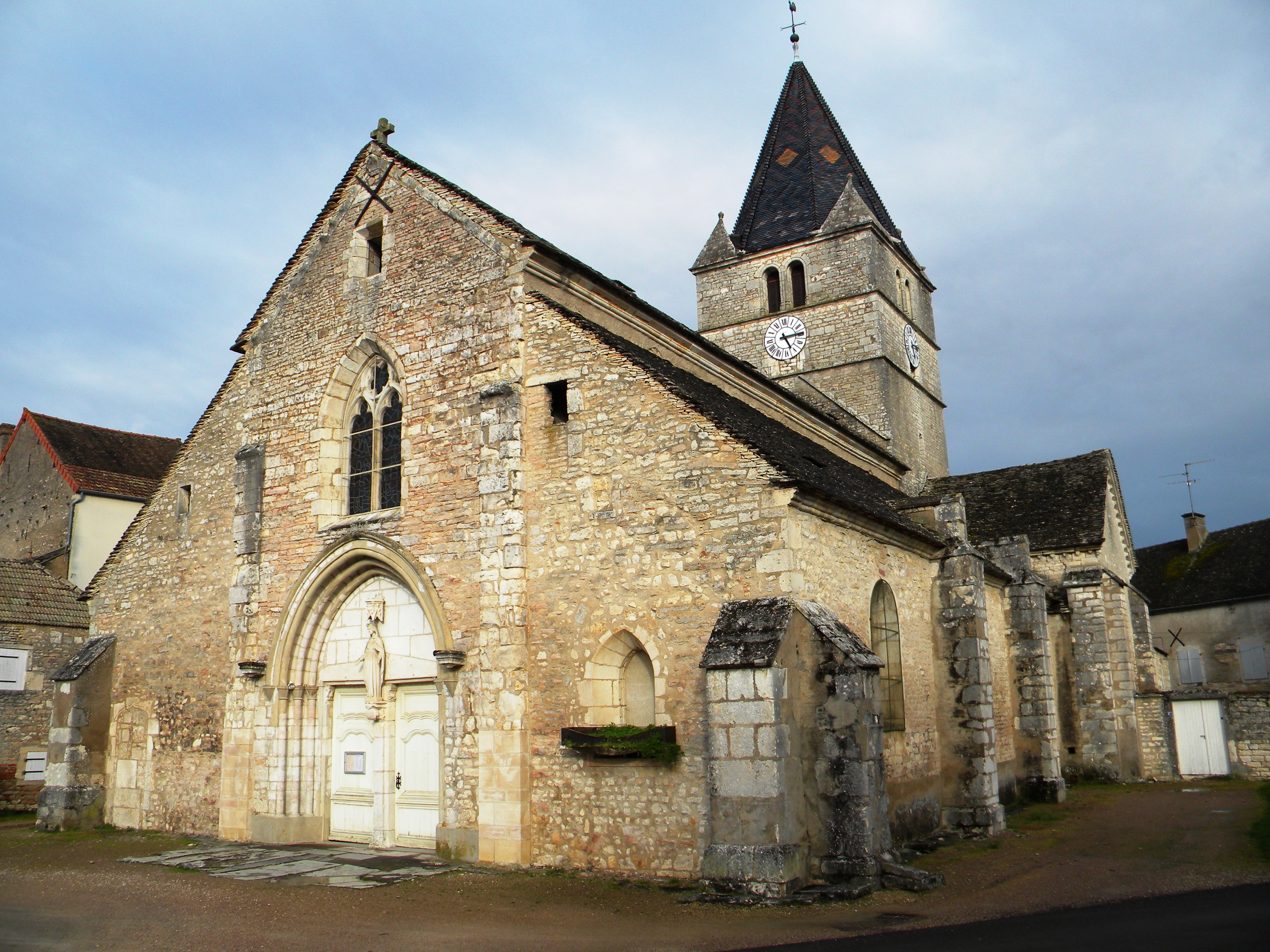
- The church in Fontaines

- Coat of arms
- Location of Fontaines
- Location within France Location within Bourgogne-Franche-Comté
- Coordinates: 46°51′03″N 4°46′23″E
- Country: France
- Region: Bourgogne-Franche-Comté
- Department: Saône-et-Loire
- Arrondissement: Chalon-sur-Saône
- Canton: Chagny
- Intercommunality: CA Le Grand Chalon

Government
  - Mayor (2020–2026): Nelly Meunier-Chanut
- Area^{1}: 24.73 km^{2} (9.55 sq mi)
- Elevation: 197 m (646 ft)
- Highest elevation: 315 m (1,033 ft)
- Lowest elevation: 183 m (600 ft)
- Population (2023): 1,841
  - Density: 74.44/km^{2} (192.8/sq mi)
- Time zone: UTC+01:00 (CET)
  - Summer (DST): UTC+02:00 (CEST)
- INSEE/Postal code: 71202 /71150
- ^{1} French Land Register data, which excludes lakes, ponds, glaciers > 1 km^{2} (0.386 sq mi or 247 acres) and river estuaries.

Fontaines (French pronunciation: [fɔ̃tɛn]) is a commune in the Saône-et-Loire department in the region of Bourgogne-Franche-Comté in eastern France.

== History ==
Formerly known as Fontanæ then Fontes, the village owes its name to the numerous springs in the area. There are traces of Roman civilization. The village belonged to the Lords of Fountains, who built a castle to the bishops of Chalon, who freed the inhabitants in 1299. The castle was plundered and destroyed in 1569. There was one prioress Benedictine, a chapel (Saint Nicolas) and several washhouses.

- There is a very beautiful Romanesque church of the 13th and 15th century, surrounded with a strengthened surrounding wall.
- This village in the peculiarity to have five washhouses what makes its currency " stony and health resort ".
- There are ruins of the monastery.
- And was recently built there a gymnasium.

== See also ==
- Communes of the Saône-et-Loire department
