= Saint-Bérain-sur-Dheune =

- Commune
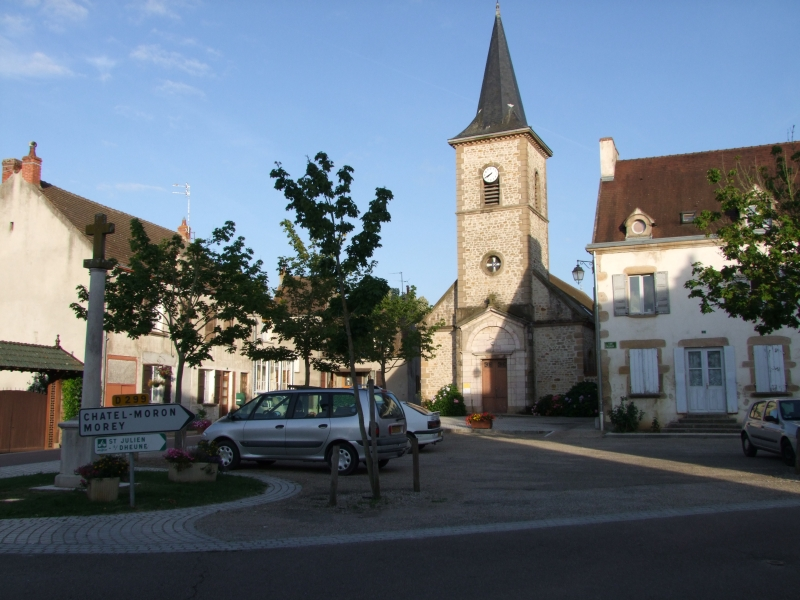
- The church and surroundings in Saint-Bérain-sur-Dheune

- Coat of arms
- Location of Saint-Bérain-sur-Dheune
- Location within France Location within Bourgogne-Franche-Comté
- Coordinates: 46°49′30″N 4°36′10″E
- Country: France
- Region: Bourgogne-Franche-Comté
- Department: Saône-et-Loire
- Arrondissement: Chalon-sur-Saône
- Canton: Chagny
- Intercommunality: CA Le Grand Chalon
- Area^{1}: 12.67 km^{2} (4.89 sq mi)
- Elevation: 240 m (790 ft)
- Highest elevation: 480 m (1,570 ft)
- Lowest elevation: 234 m (768 ft)
- Population (2023): 538
  - Density: 42.5/km^{2} (110/sq mi)
- Time zone: UTC+01:00 (CET)
  - Summer (DST): UTC+02:00 (CEST)
- INSEE/Postal code: 71391 /71510
- ^{1} French Land Register data, which excludes lakes, ponds, glaciers > 1 km^{2} (0.386 sq mi or 247 acres) and river estuaries.

Saint-Bérain-sur-Dheune (French pronunciation: [sɛ̃ beʁɛ̃ syʁ dœn], Saint-Bérain on Dheune) is a commune in the Saône-et-Loire department in the region of Bourgogne-Franche-Comté in eastern France.

== See also ==
- Communes of the Saône-et-Loire department
