= Essertenne =

- Commune
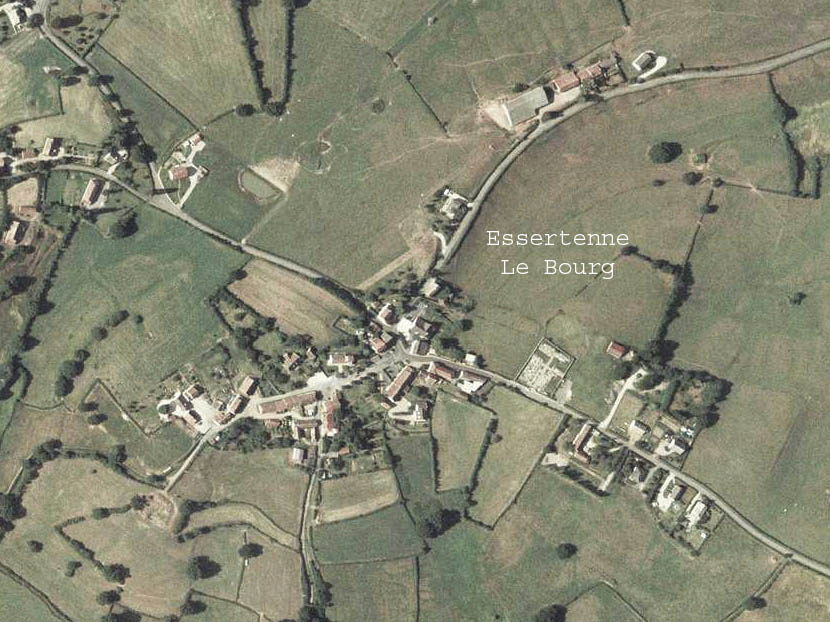
- An aerial view of Essertenne
- Location of Essertenne
- Location within France Location within Bourgogne-Franche-Comté
- Coordinates: 46°48′46″N 4°32′47″E
- Country: France
- Region: Bourgogne-Franche-Comté
- Department: Saône-et-Loire
- Arrondissement: Autun
- Canton: Chagny
- Intercommunality: CU Creusot Montceau

Government
  - Mayor (2020–2026): Marc Mailliot
- Area^{1}: 12.82 km^{2} (4.95 sq mi)
- Elevation: 300 m (980 ft)
- Highest elevation: 381 m (1,250 ft)
- Lowest elevation: 243 m (797 ft)
- Population (2023): 483
  - Density: 37.7/km^{2} (97.6/sq mi)
- Time zone: UTC+01:00 (CET)
  - Summer (DST): UTC+02:00 (CEST)
- INSEE/Postal code: 71191 /71510
- ^{1} French Land Register data, which excludes lakes, ponds, glaciers > 1 km^{2} (0.386 sq mi or 247 acres) and river estuaries.

Essertenne (French pronunciation: [esɛʁtɛn]) is a commune in the Saône-et-Loire department in the region of Bourgogne-Franche-Comté in eastern France.

== See also ==
- Communes of the Saône-et-Loire department
