= Couches, Saône-et-Loire =

Couches
- Commune
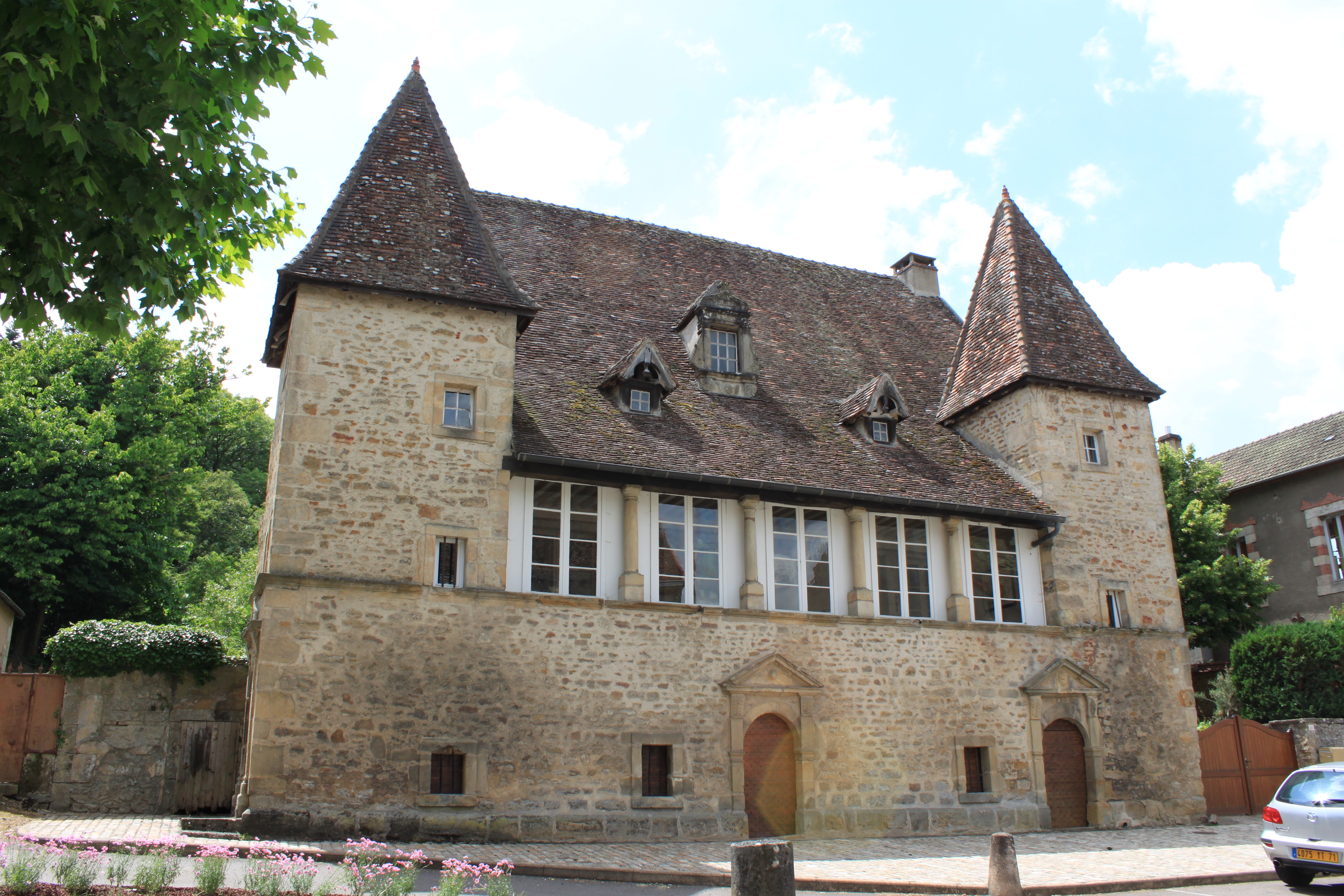
- Templar manor

- Coat of arms
- Location of Couches
- Location within France Location within Bourgogne-Franche-Comté
- Coordinates: 46°52′14″N 4°34′23″E
- Country: France
- Region: Bourgogne-Franche-Comté
- Department: Saône-et-Loire
- Arrondissement: Autun
- Canton: Chagny
- Area^{1}: 19.52 km^{2} (7.54 sq mi)
- Elevation: 350 m (1,150 ft)
- Highest elevation: 466 m (1,529 ft)
- Lowest elevation: 231 m (758 ft)
- Population (2023): 1,213
  - Density: 62.14/km^{2} (160.9/sq mi)
- Time zone: UTC+01:00 (CET)
  - Summer (DST): UTC+02:00 (CEST)
- INSEE/Postal code: 71149 /71490
- ^{1} French Land Register data, which excludes lakes, ponds, glaciers > 1 km^{2} (0.386 sq mi or 247 acres) and river estuaries.

Couches (French pronunciation: [kuʃ]) is a commune in the Saône-et-Loire department in the region of Bourgogne-Franche-Comté in eastern France.

== Sights ==
=== Chateau ===
The chateau complex includes a number of structures from different periods.

The chateau is often called the chateau of Margaret of Burgundy, Queen of France, wife of Louis X of France, who was confined to the Chateau Gaillard after allegedly committing adultery. She died there after apparent ill treatment in 1315. One version of the story is that she did not die in the Chateau Gaillard, but escaped and was taken in by her cousin, Marie of Couches, and housed in the chateau and died there in 1333.

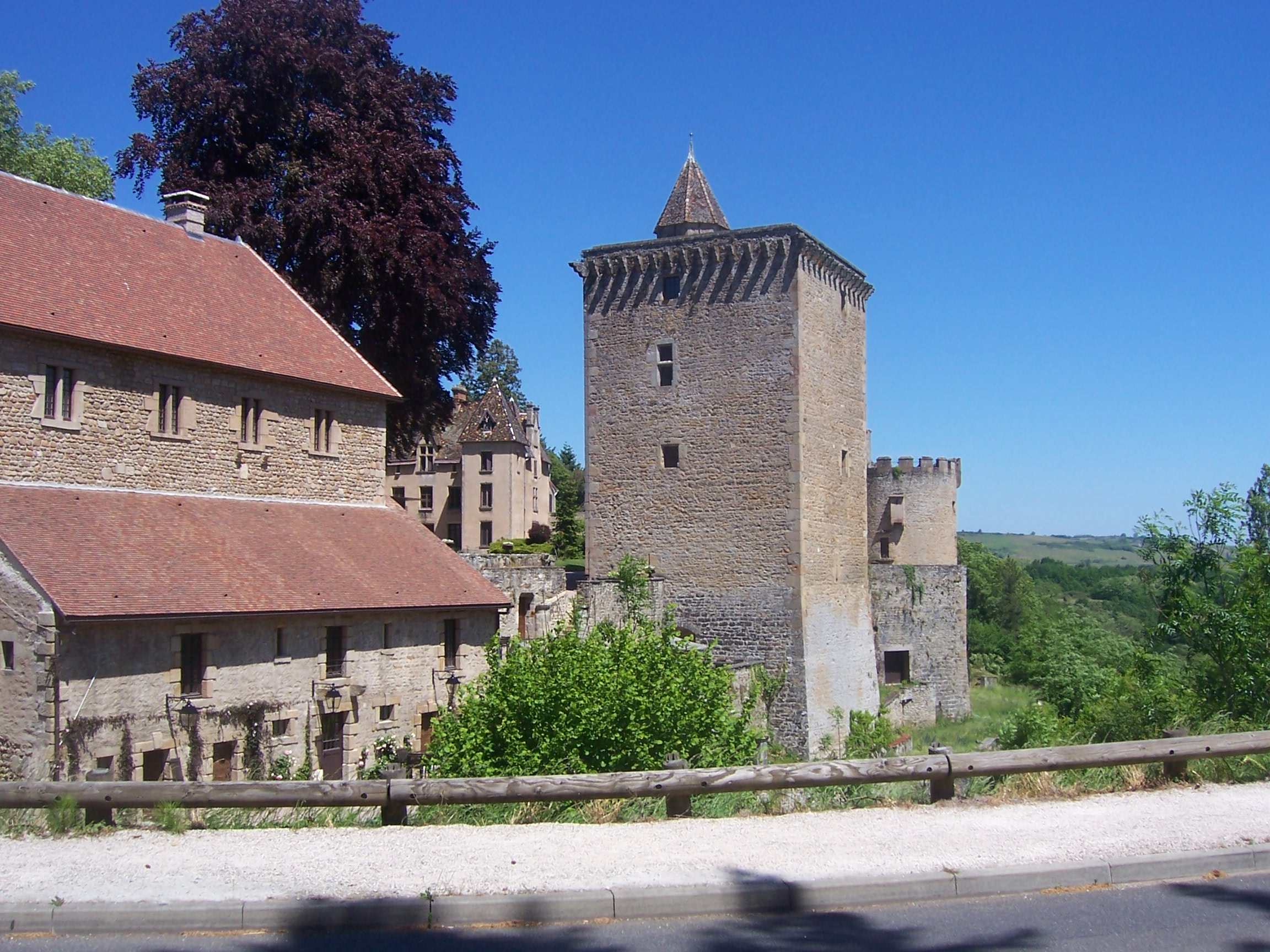
Chateau

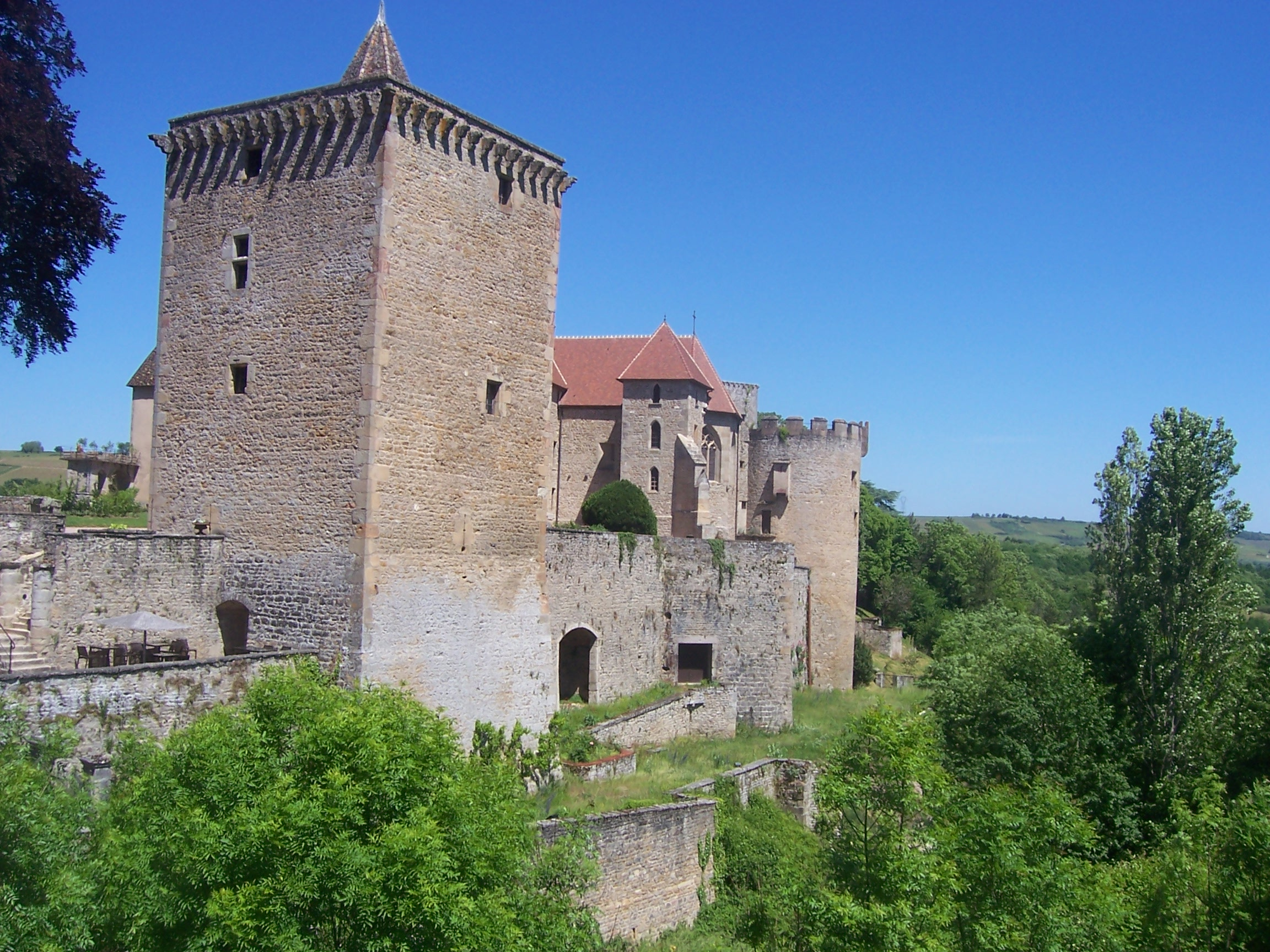
Chateau

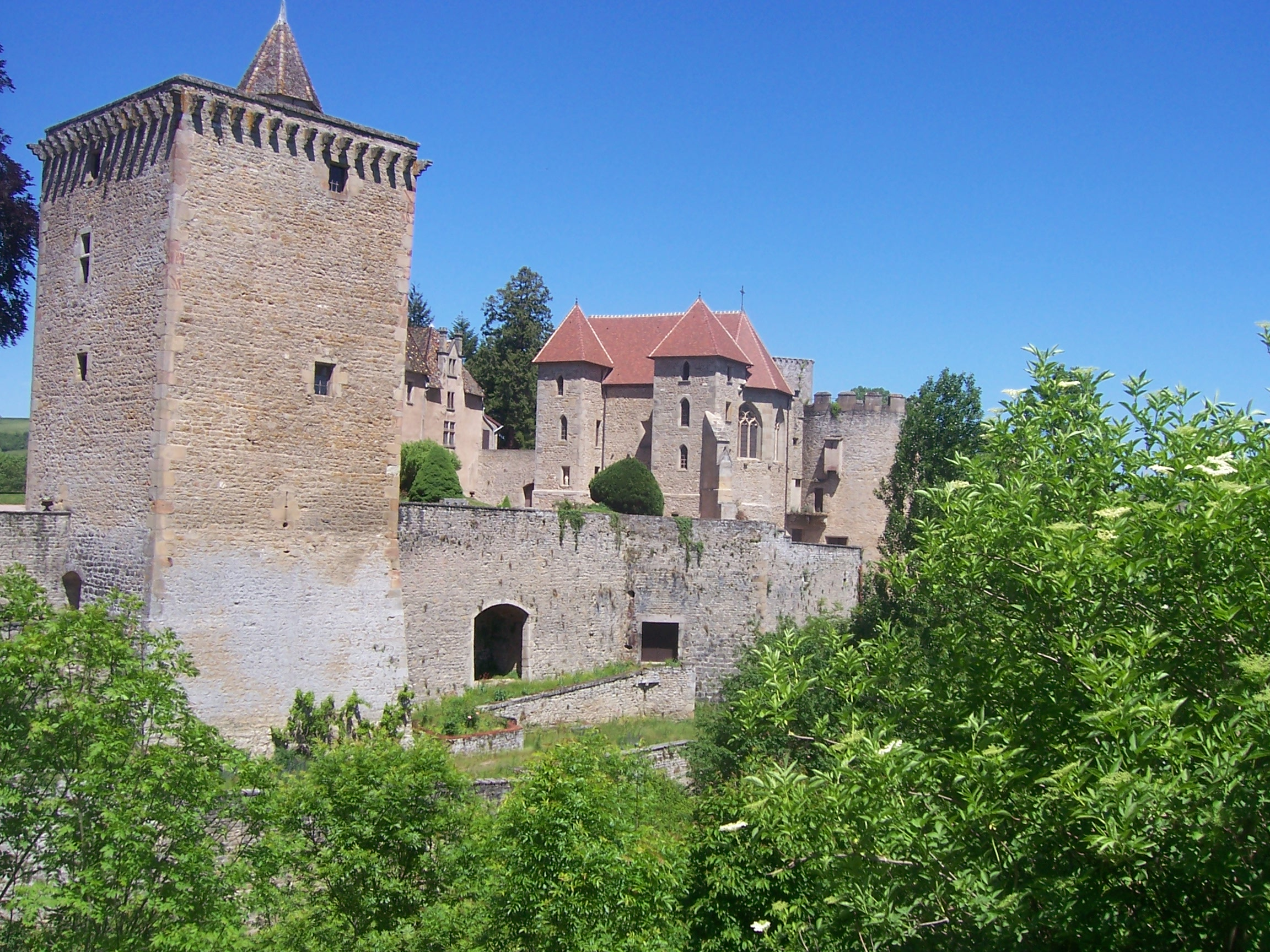
Chateau

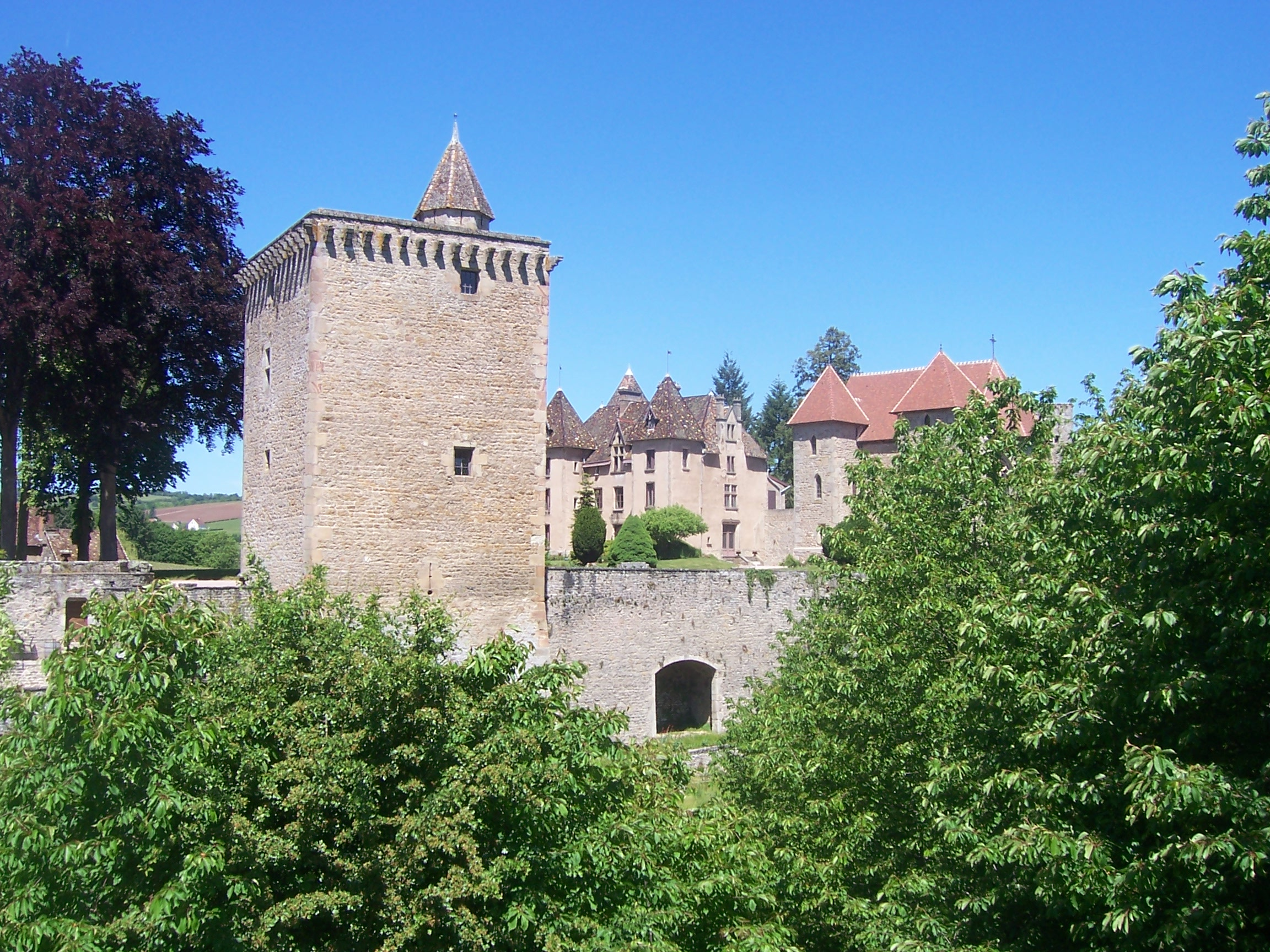
Chateau

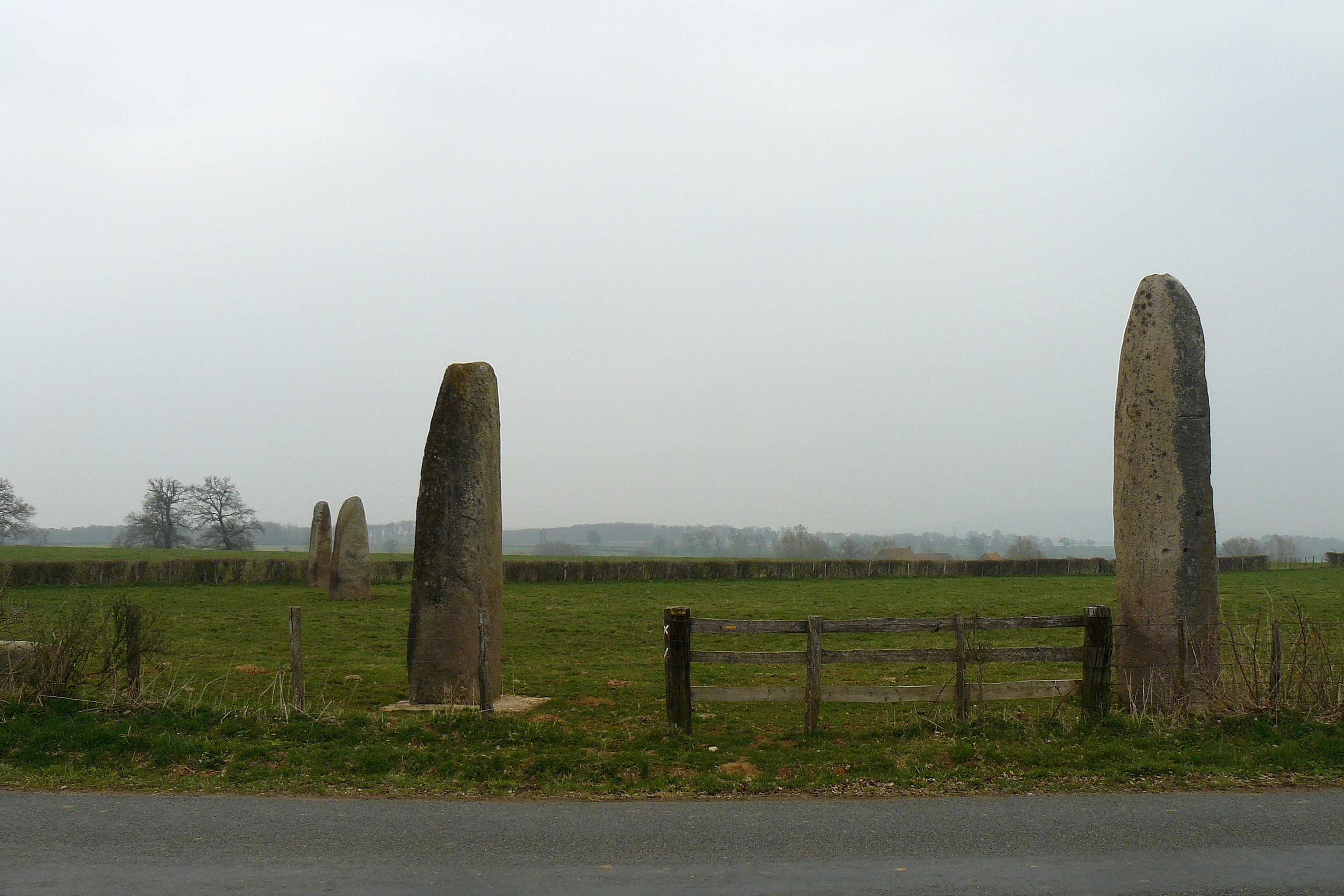
Menhirs

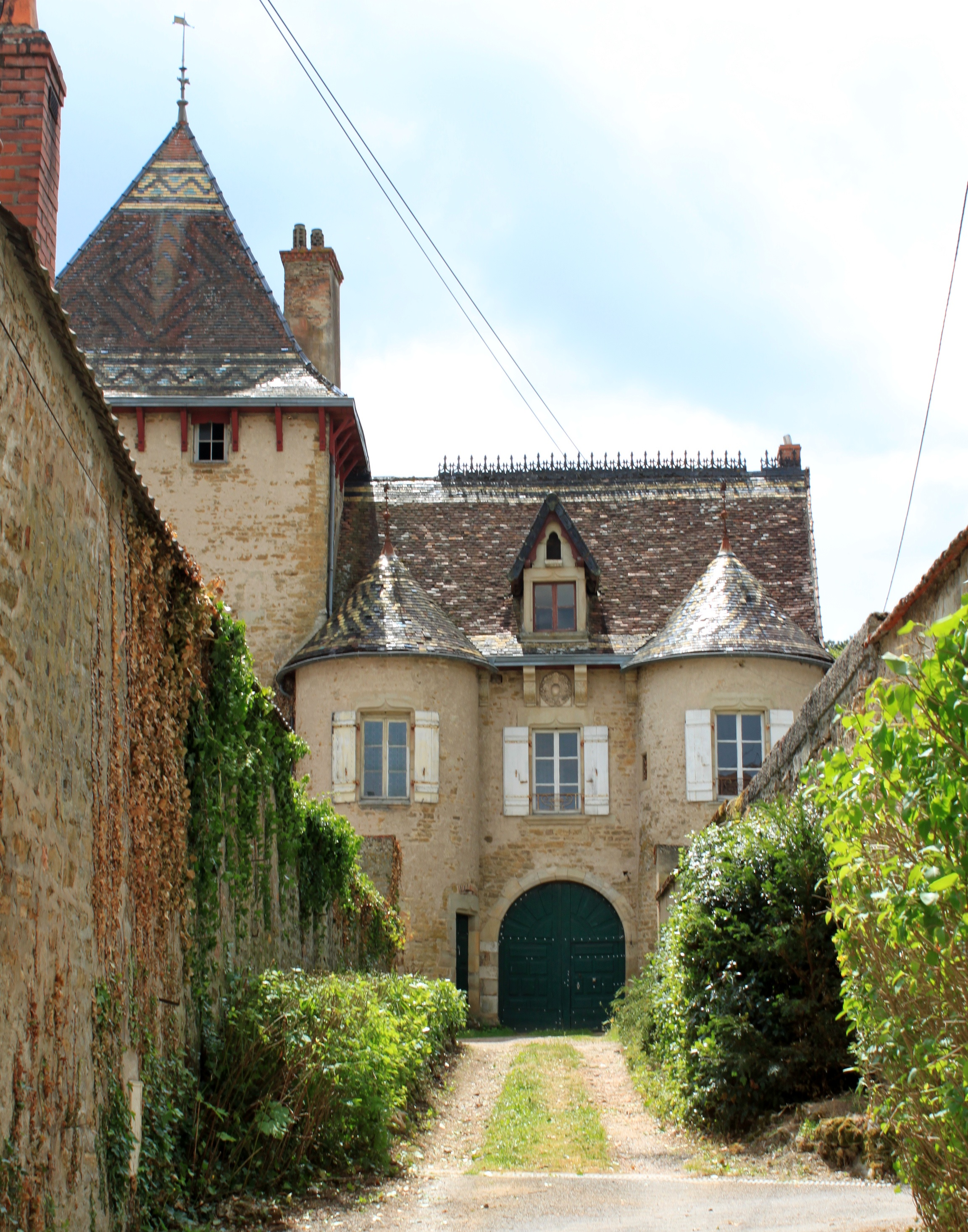
Tour Guerin

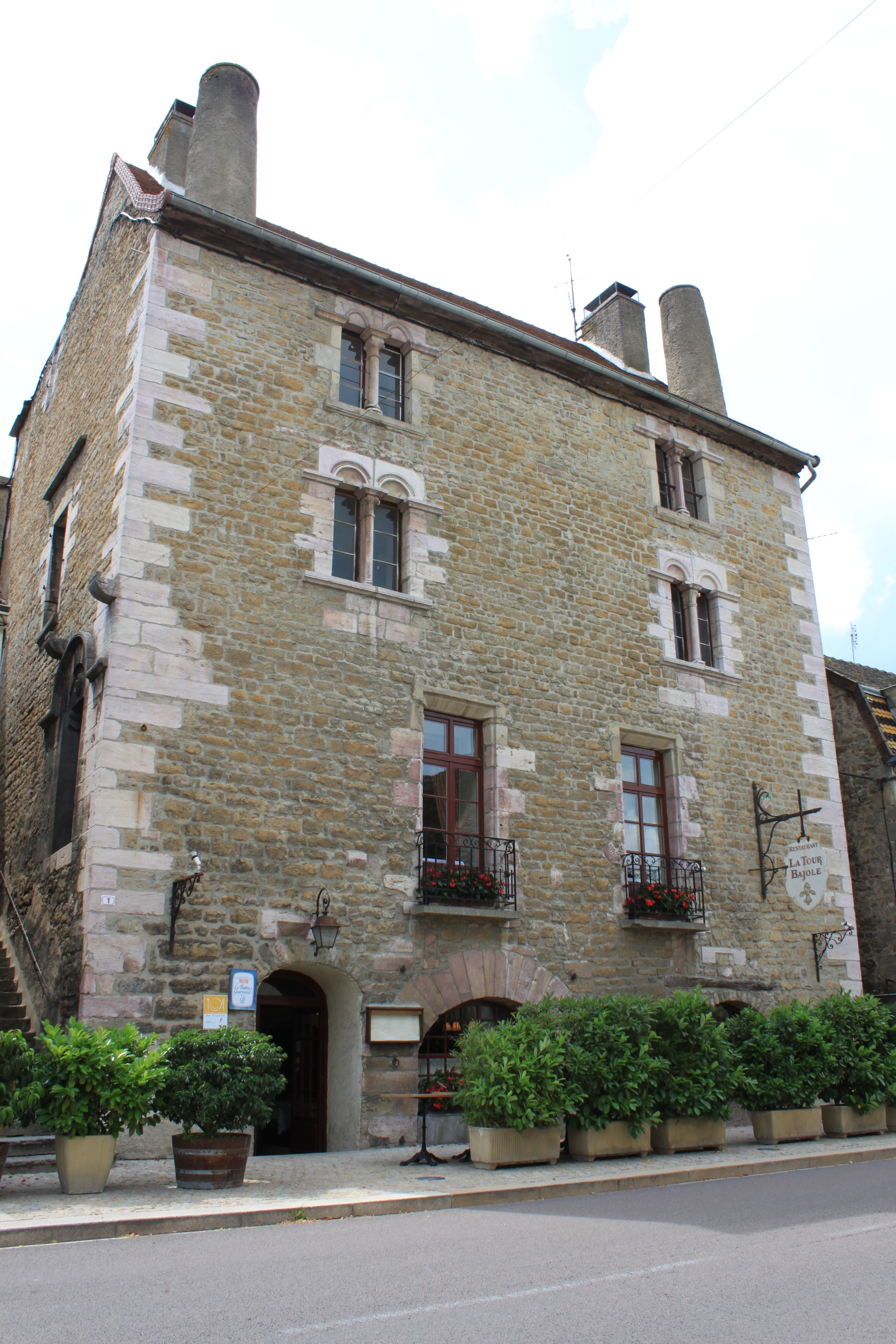
Tour Bajole

== See also ==
- Communes of the Saône-et-Loire department
