= Écuelles =

Écuelles is the name of two communes in France:

- Écuelles, Saône-et-Loire, in the Saône-et-Loire département
- Écuelles, Seine-et-Marne, in the Seine-et-Marne département
