= Saint Gervais =

Saint Gervais or Gervase (Latin: Gervasius) may refer to:

- Gervasius and Protasius, Christian twins martyred during the reign of Nero (r. 54–68)
- Gervasius (4th century), deacon of Le Mans and martyr, namesake of Saint-Gervais-en-Vallière
- Gervasius (fl. 680), bishop of Besançon

== See also ==
- Saint-Gervais
