= Saint-Gervais =

Saint-Gervais may refer to the following places:

== France ==
- Saint-Gervais, former commune of the Aveyron department, now part of Saint-Symphorien-de-Thénières
- Saint-Gervais, former commune of the Charente department, now part of Nanteuil-en-Vallée
- Saint-Gervais, Gard, in the Gard department
- Saint-Gervais, Gironde, in the Gironde department
- Saint-Gervais, Isère, in the Isère department
- Saint-Gervais, Vendée, in the Vendée department
- Saint-Gervais, Val-d'Oise, in the Val-d'Oise department
- Saint-Gervais-d'Auvergne, in the Puy-de-Dôme department
- Saint-Gervais-des-Sablons, in the Orne department
- Saint-Gervais-de-Vic, in the Sarthe department
- Saint-Gervais-du-Perron, in the Orne department
- Saint-Gervais-en-Belin, in the Sarthe department
- Saint-Gervais-en-Vallière, in the Saône-et-Loire department
- Saint-Gervais-la-Forêt, in the Loir-et-Cher department
- Saint-Gervais-les-Bains, in the Haute-Savoie department, a ski resort
- Saint-Gervais-les-Trois-Clochers, in the Vienne department
- Saint-Gervais-sous-Meymont, in the Puy-de-Dôme department
- Saint-Gervais-sur-Couches, in the Saône-et-Loire department
- Saint-Gervais-sur-Mare, in the Hérault department
- Saint-Gervais-sur-Roubion, in the Drôme department
- Saint-Jean-Saint-Gervais, in the Puy-de-Dôme department

== Elsewhere ==
- Saint-Gervais, Quebec, Canada
- Saint-Gervais (Geneva), a neighbourhood of Geneva, Switzerland

== Other uses ==
- Place Saint-Gervais, a square in Paris, adjacent to the city hall
- St-Gervais-et-St-Protais Church, in Paris

== See also ==
- Saint Gervais (disambiguation)
