= Toutenant =

- Commune
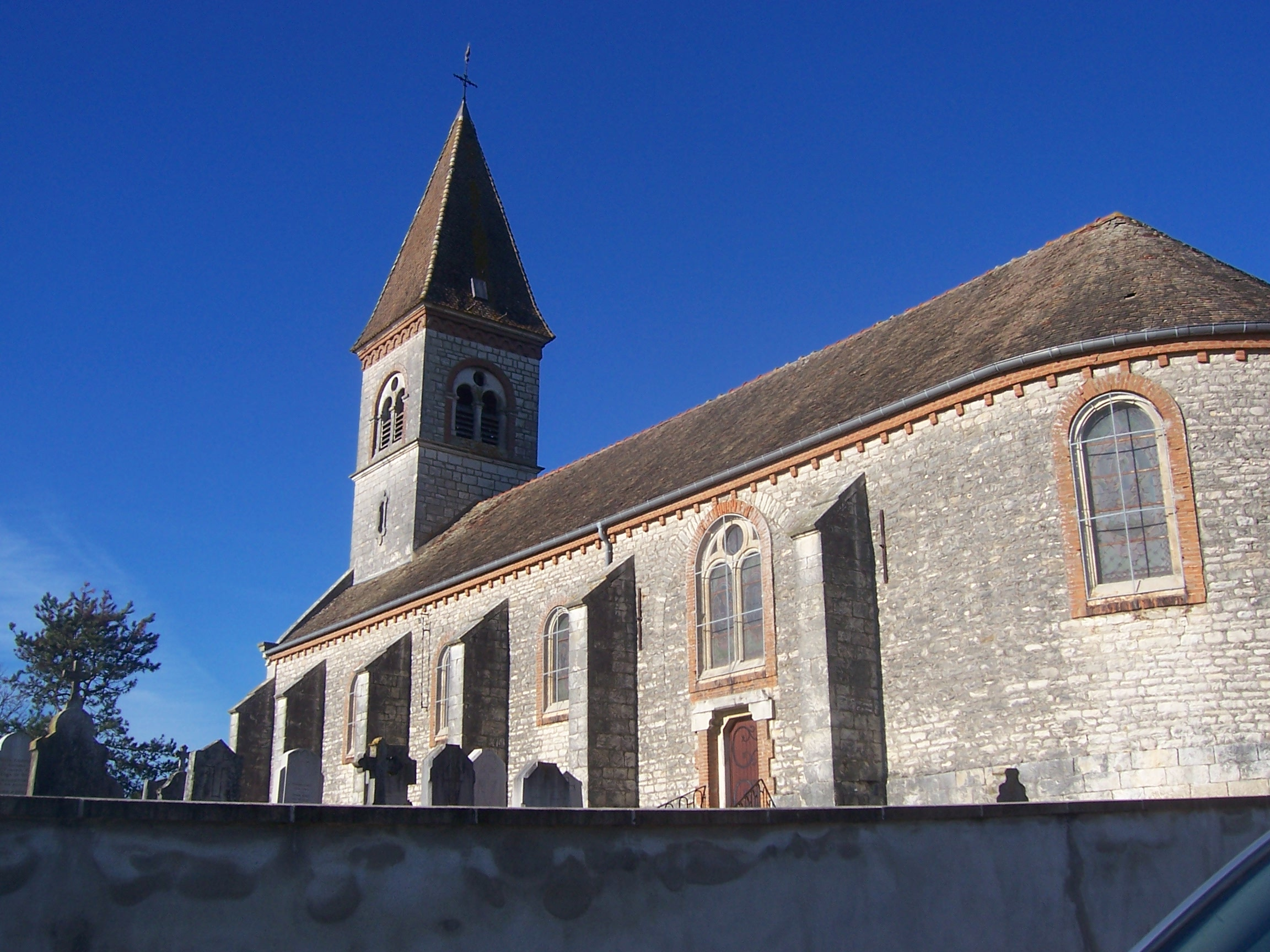
- The church in Toutenant
- Location of Toutenant
- Location within France Location within Bourgogne-Franche-Comté
- Coordinates: 46°52′34″N 5°06′56″E
- Country: France
- Region: Bourgogne-Franche-Comté
- Department: Saône-et-Loire
- Arrondissement: Chalon-sur-Saône
- Canton: Gergy
- Area^{1}: 13.62 km^{2} (5.26 sq mi)
- Elevation: 190 m (620 ft)
- Highest elevation: 193 m (633 ft)
- Lowest elevation: 177 m (581 ft)
- Population (2023): 170
  - Density: 12/km^{2} (32/sq mi)
- Time zone: UTC+01:00 (CET)
  - Summer (DST): UTC+02:00 (CEST)
- INSEE/Postal code: 71544 /71350
- ^{1} French Land Register data, which excludes lakes, ponds, glaciers > 1 km^{2} (0.386 sq mi or 247 acres) and river estuaries.

Toutenant (French pronunciation: [tutnɑ̃]) is a commune in the Saône-et-Loire department in the region of Bourgogne-Franche-Comté in eastern France.

== See also ==
- Communes of the Saône-et-Loire department
