= Longepierre =

- Commune
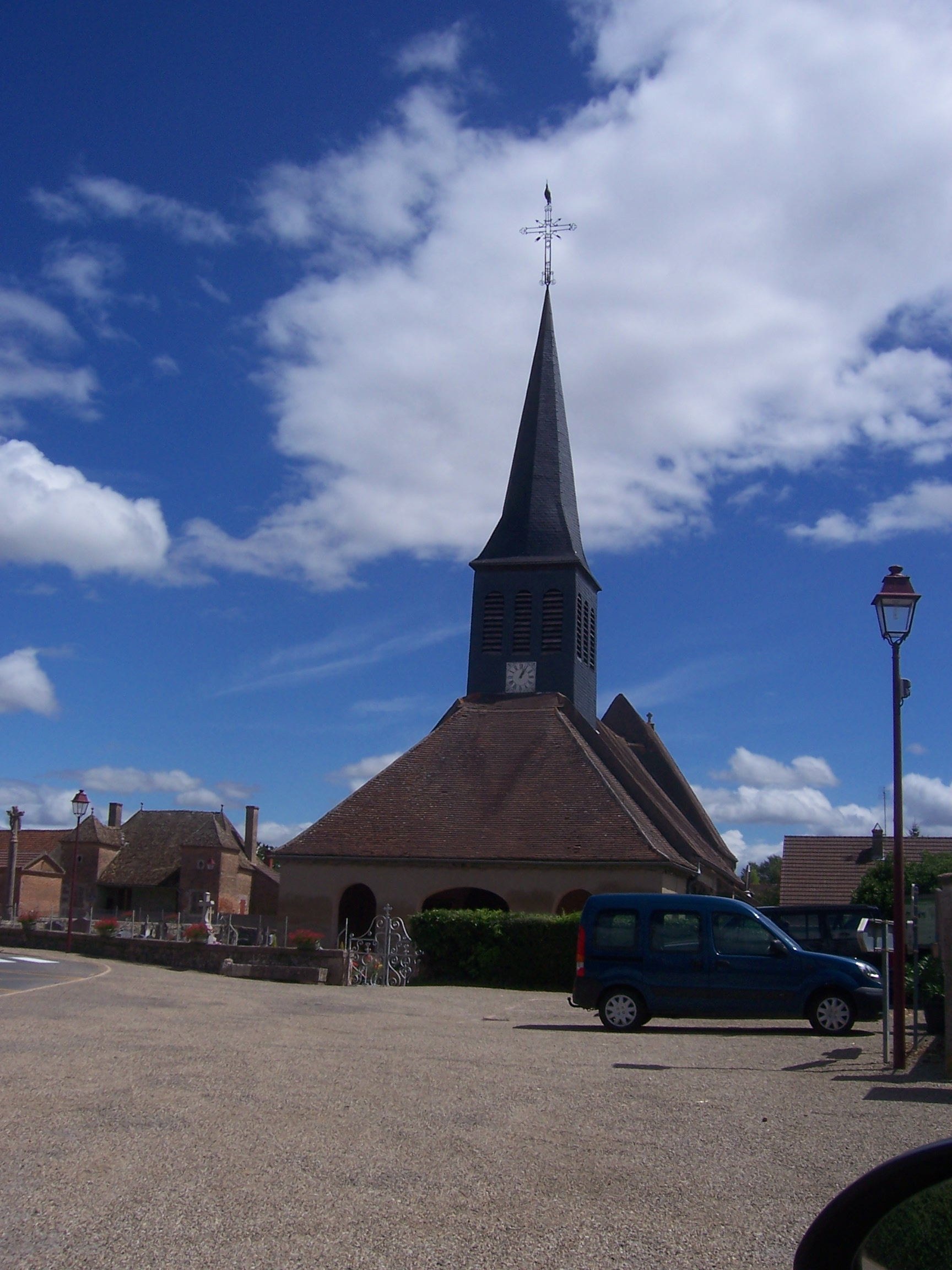
- The church in Longepierre

- Coat of arms
- Location of Longepierre
- Location within France Location within Bourgogne-Franche-Comté
- Coordinates: 46°56′10″N 5°12′34″E
- Country: France
- Region: Bourgogne-Franche-Comté
- Department: Saône-et-Loire
- Arrondissement: Chalon-sur-Saône
- Canton: Gergy
- Area^{1}: 12.05 km^{2} (4.65 sq mi)
- Elevation: 232 m (761 ft)
- Highest elevation: 182 m (597 ft)
- Lowest elevation: 173 m (568 ft)
- Population (2023): 161
  - Density: 13.4/km^{2} (34.6/sq mi)
- Time zone: UTC+01:00 (CET)
  - Summer (DST): UTC+02:00 (CEST)
- INSEE/Postal code: 71262 /71270
- ^{1} French Land Register data, which excludes lakes, ponds, glaciers > 1 km^{2} (0.386 sq mi or 247 acres) and river estuaries.

Longepierre is a commune in the Saône-et-Loire department in the region of Bourgogne-Franche-Comté in eastern France.

== See also ==
- Communes of the Saône-et-Loire department
