= Arrondissement of Chalon-sur-Saône =

Coordinates: 46°46′50″N 4°51′10″E

Chalon-sur-Saône
- Arrondissement
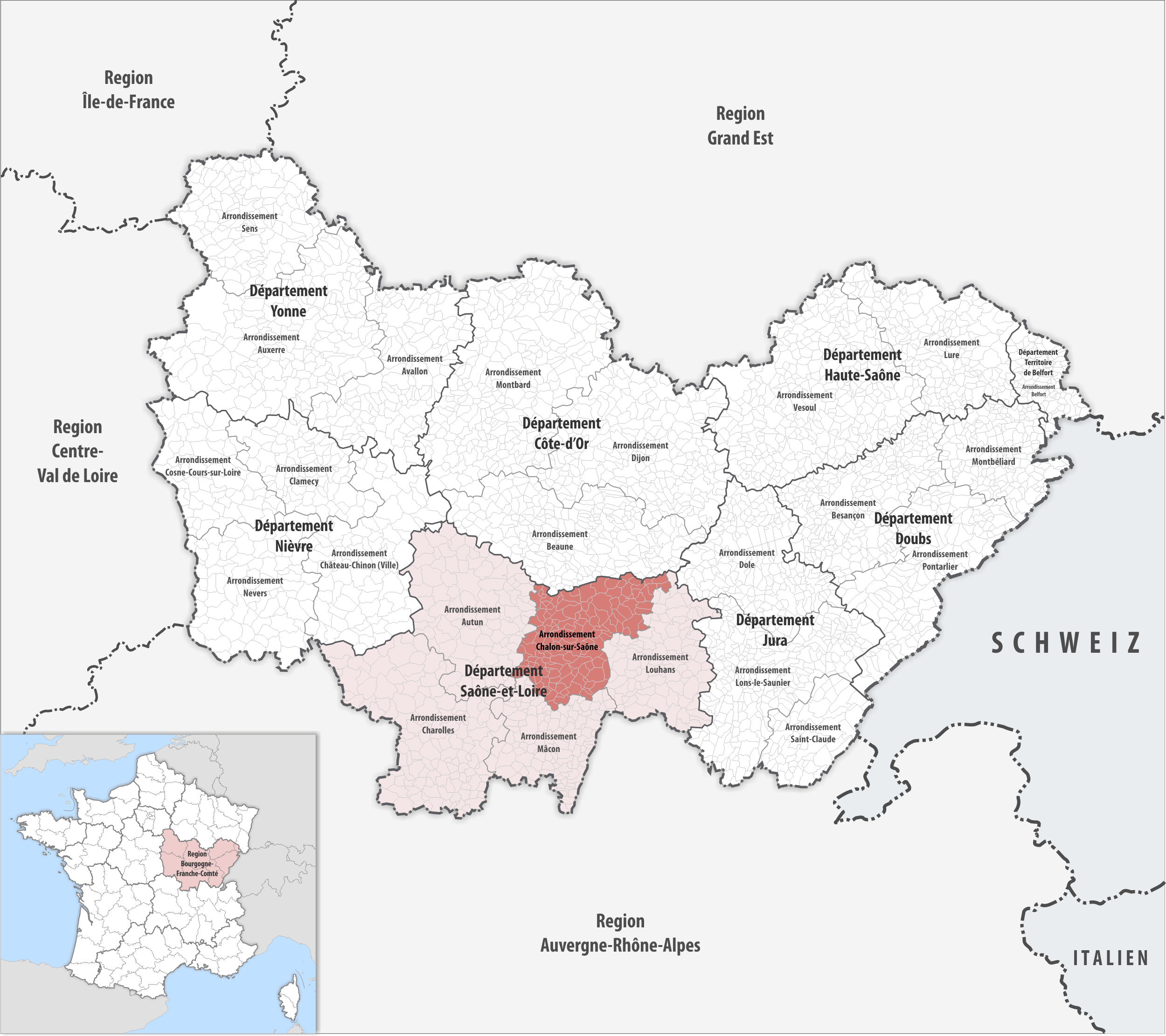
- Location within the region Bourgogne-Franche-Comté
- Country: France
- Region: Bourgogne-Franche-Comté
- Department: Saône-et-Loire
- No. of communes: {{{nbcomm}}}
- Area: 1,484.5 km^{2} (573.2 sq mi)
- Population (2023): 155,940
  - Density: 105.05/km^{2} (272.07/sq mi)
- INSEE code: 712

The arrondissement of Chalon-sur-Saône is an arrondissement of France in the Saône-et-Loire department in the Bourgogne-Franche-Comté region. It has 141 communes. Its population is 155,905 (2021), and its area is 1,484.5 km^{2} (573.2 sq mi).

== Composition ==
The communes of the arrondissement of Chalon-sur-Saône, and their INSEE codes, are:

1. Allerey-sur-Saône (71003)
2. Allériot (71004)
3. Aluze (71005)
4. Barizey (71019)
5. Beaumont-sur-Grosne (71026)
6. Bey (71033)
7. Bissey-sous-Cruchaud (71034)
8. Bissy-sous-Uxelles (71036)
9. Bissy-sur-Fley (71037)
10. Les Bordes (71043)
11. Bouzeron (71051)
12. Boyer (71052)
13. Bragny-sur-Saône (71054)
14. Bresse-sur-Grosne (71058)
15. Burnand (71067)
16. Buxy (71070)
17. Cersot (71072)
18. Chagny (71073)
19. Chalon-sur-Saône (71076)
20. Chamilly (71078)
21. Champagny-sous-Uxelles (71080)
22. Champforgeuil (71081)
23. Change (71085)
24. Chapaize (71087)
25. La Chapelle-de-Bragny (71089)
26. La Charmée (71102)
27. Charnay-lès-Chalon (71104)
28. Charrecey (71107)
29. Chassey-le-Camp (71109)
30. Châtel-Moron (71115)
31. Châtenoy-en-Bresse (71117)
32. Châtenoy-le-Royal (71118)
33. Chaudenay (71119)
34. Cheilly-lès-Maranges (71122)
35. Chenôves (71124)
36. Clux-Villeneuve (71578)
37. Collonge-en-Charollais (71139)
38. Cormatin (71145)
39. Crissey (71154)
40. Culles-les-Roches (71159)
41. Curtil-sous-Burnand (71164)
42. Damerey (71167)
43. Demigny (71170)
44. Dennevy (71171)
45. Dezize-lès-Maranges (71174)
46. Dracy-le-Fort (71182)
47. Écuelles (71186)
48. Épervans (71189)
49. Étrigny (71193)
50. Farges-lès-Chalon (71194)
51. Fley (71201)
52. Fontaines (71202)
53. Fragnes-la-Loyère (71204)
54. Genouilly (71214)
55. Gergy (71215)
56. Germagny (71216)
57. Gigny-sur-Saône (71219)
58. Givry (71221)
59. Granges (71225)
60. Guerfand (71228)
61. Jambles (71241)
62. Jugy (71245)
63. Jully-lès-Buxy (71247)
64. Laives (71249)
65. Lalheue (71252)
66. Lans (71253)
67. Lessard-le-National (71257)
68. Longepierre (71262)
69. Lux (71269)
70. Malay (71272)
71. Mancey (71274)
72. Marcilly-lès-Buxy (71277)
73. Marnay (71283)
74. Mellecey (71292)
75. Mercurey (71294)
76. Messey-sur-Grosne (71296)
77. Montagny-lès-Buxy (71302)
78. Montceaux-Ragny (71308)
79. Montcoy (71312)
80. Mont-lès-Seurre (71315)
81. Moroges (71324)
82. Nanton (71328)
83. Navilly (71329)
84. Oslon (71333)
85. Palleau (71341)
86. Paris-l'Hôpital (71343)
87. Pontoux (71355)
88. Le Puley (71363)
89. Remigny (71369)
90. Rosey (71374)
91. Rully (71378)
92. Saint-Ambreuil (71384)
93. Saint-Boil (71392)
94. Saint-Bérain-sur-Dheune (71391)
95. Saint-Cyr (71402)
96. Saint-Denis-de-Vaux (71403)
97. Saint-Désert (71404)
98. Saint-Didier-en-Bresse (71405)
99. Sainte-Hélène (71426)
100. Saint-Gengoux-le-National (71417)
101. Saint-Germain-lès-Buxy (71422)
102. Saint-Gervais-en-Vallière (71423)
103. Saint-Gilles (71425)
104. Saint-Jean-de-Vaux (71430)
105. Saint-Léger-sur-Dheune (71442)
106. Saint-Loup-de-Varennes (71444)
107. Saint-Loup-Géanges (71443)
108. Saint-Marcel (71445)
109. Saint-Mard-de-Vaux (71447)
110. Saint-Martin-d'Auxy (71449)
111. Saint-Martin-du-Tartre (71455)
112. Saint-Martin-en-Bresse (71456)
113. Saint-Martin-en-Gâtinois (71457)
114. Saint-Martin-sous-Montaigu (71459)
115. Saint-Maurice-des-Champs (71461)
116. Saint-Maurice-en-Rivière (71462)
117. Saint-Privé (71471)
118. Saint-Rémy (71475)
119. Saint-Sernin-du-Plain (71480)
120. Saint-Vallerin (71485)
121. Sampigny-lès-Maranges (71496)
122. Santilly (71498)
123. Sassangy (71501)
124. Sassenay (71502)
125. Saules (71503)
126. Saunières (71504)
127. Savianges (71505)
128. Savigny-sur-Grosne (71507)
129. Sennecey-le-Grand (71512)
130. Sercy (71515)
131. Sermesse (71517)
132. Sevrey (71520)
133. Toutenant (71544)
134. Varennes-le-Grand (71555)
135. Vaux-en-Pré (71563)
136. Verdun-Ciel (71566)
137. Verjux (71570)
138. Vers (71572)
139. Villegaudin (71577)
140. Villeneuve-en-Montagne (71579)
141. Virey-le-Grand (71585)

== History ==
The arrondissement of Chalon-sur-Saône was created in 1800. In January 2017 it gained six communes from the arrondissement of Autun, one commune from the arrondissement of Charolles and eight communes from the arrondissement of Mâcon, and it lost 14 communes to the arrondissement of Autun, seven communes to the arrondissement of Louhans and one commune to the arrondissement of Mâcon.

As a result of the reorganisation of the cantons of France which came into effect in 2015, the borders of the cantons are no longer related to the borders of the arrondissements. The cantons of the arrondissement of Chalon-sur-Saône were, as of January 2015:

1. Buxy
2. Chagny
3. Chalon-sur-Saône-Centre
4. Chalon-sur-Saône-Nord
5. Chalon-sur-Saône-Ouest
6. Chalon-sur-Saône-Sud
7. Givry
8. Montceau-les-Mines-Nord
9. Montceau-les-Mines-Sud
10. Montchanin
11. Mont-Saint-Vincent
12. Saint-Germain-du-Plain
13. Saint-Martin-en-Bresse
14. Sennecey-le-Grand
15. Verdun-sur-le-Doubs
