= Les Bordes, Saône-et-Loire =

Les Bordes
- Commune
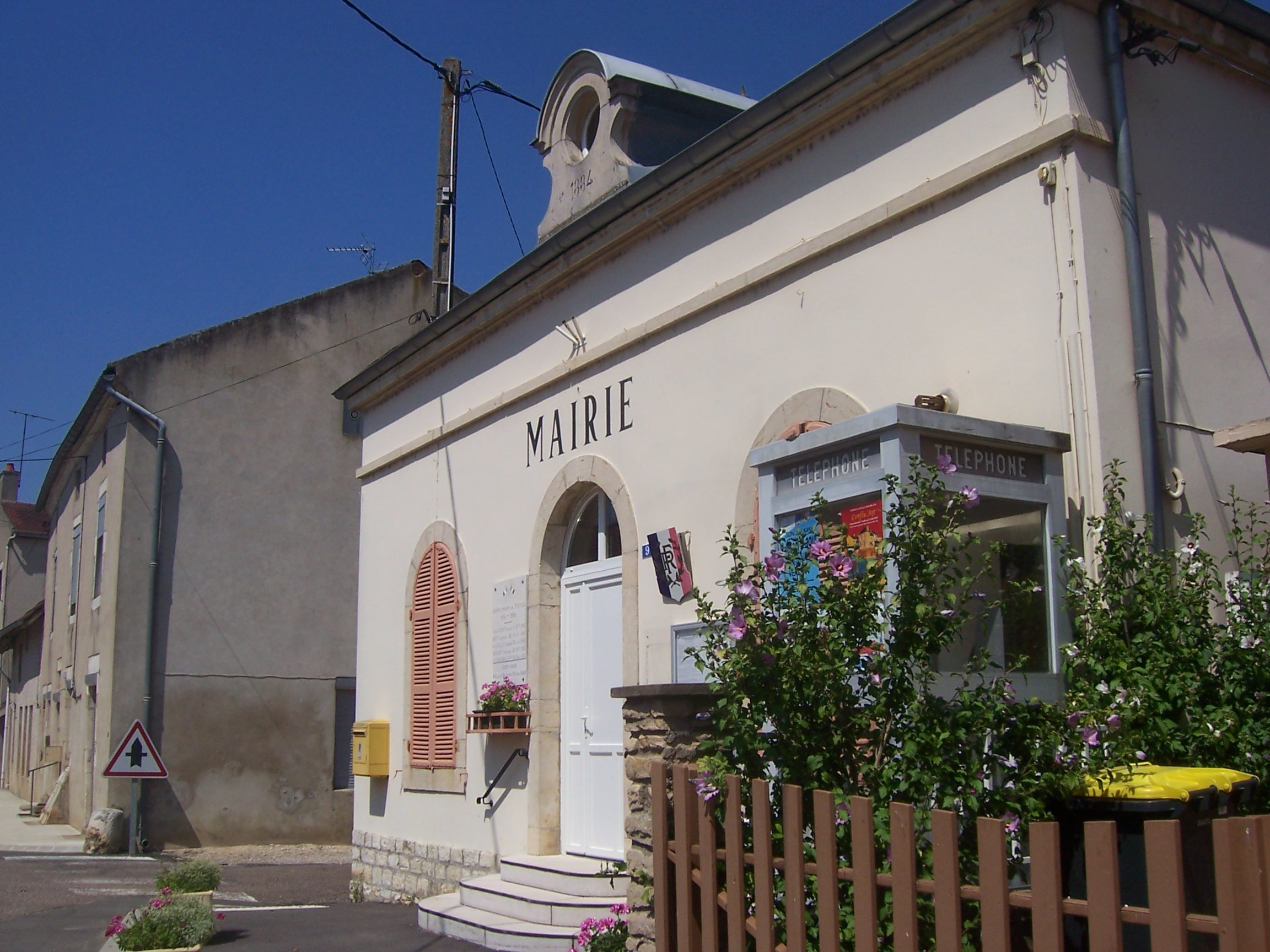
- Town hall

- Coat of arms
- Location of Les Bordes
- Location within France Location within Bourgogne-Franche-Comté
- Coordinates: 46°53′49″N 5°01′47″E
- Country: France
- Region: Bourgogne-Franche-Comté
- Department: Saône-et-Loire
- Arrondissement: Chalon-sur-Saône
- Canton: Gergy

Government
  - Mayor (2020–2026): Jean-Michel Le Méchec
- Area^{1}: 2.28 km^{2} (0.88 sq mi)
- Elevation: 173 m (568 ft)
- Highest elevation: 179 m (587 ft)
- Lowest elevation: 169 m (554 ft)
- Population (2023): 85
  - Density: 37/km^{2} (97/sq mi)
- Time zone: UTC+01:00 (CET)
  - Summer (DST): UTC+02:00 (CEST)
- INSEE/Postal code: 71043 /71350
- ^{1} French Land Register data, which excludes lakes, ponds, glaciers > 1 km^{2} (0.386 sq mi or 247 acres) and river estuaries.

Les Bordes (French pronunciation: [le bɔʁd]) is a commune in the Saône-et-Loire department in the region of Bourgogne-Franche-Comté in eastern France.

== See also ==
- Communes of the Saône-et-Loire department
