= Saint-Martin-en-Gâtinois =

- Commune
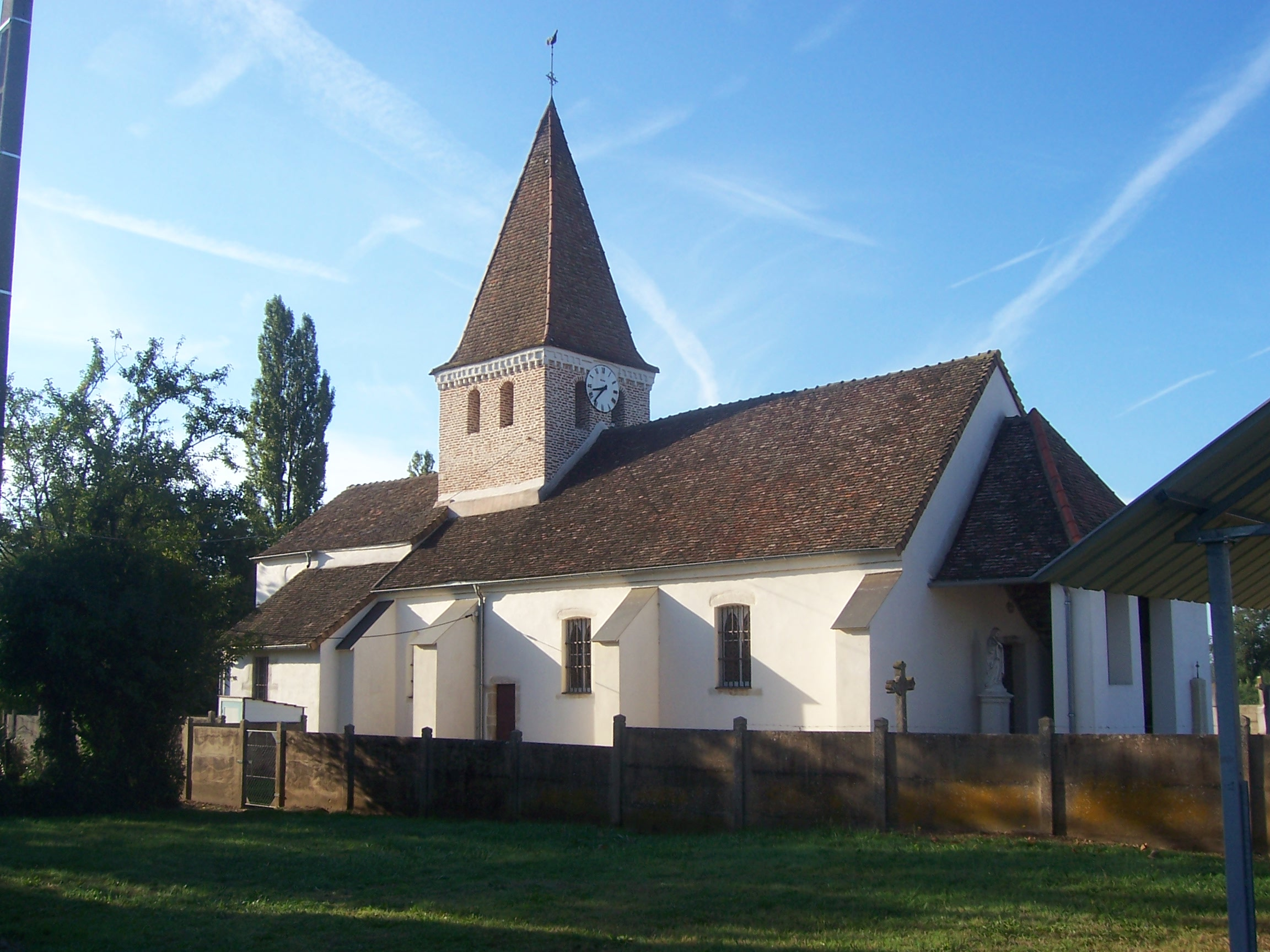
- The church in Saint-Martin-en-Gâtinois
- Location of Saint-Martin-en-Gâtinois
- Location within France Location within Bourgogne-Franche-Comté
- Coordinates: 46°56′37″N 5°00′58″E
- Country: France
- Region: Bourgogne-Franche-Comté
- Department: Saône-et-Loire
- Arrondissement: Chalon-sur-Saône
- Canton: Gergy
- Area^{1}: 7.29 km^{2} (2.81 sq mi)
- Elevation: 190 m (620 ft)
- Highest elevation: 200 m (660 ft)
- Lowest elevation: 175 m (574 ft)
- Population (2023): 120
  - Density: 16/km^{2} (43/sq mi)
- Time zone: UTC+01:00 (CET)
  - Summer (DST): UTC+02:00 (CEST)
- INSEE/Postal code: 71457 /71350
- ^{1} French Land Register data, which excludes lakes, ponds, glaciers > 1 km^{2} (0.386 sq mi or 247 acres) and river estuaries.

Saint-Martin-en-Gâtinois is a commune in the Saône-et-Loire department in the region of Bourgogne-Franche-Comté in eastern France.

== See also ==
- Communes of the Saône-et-Loire department
