= Canton of Gergy =

Coordinates: 46.88°N 4.95°E

The canton of Gergy is an administrative division of the Saône-et-Loire department, eastern France. It was created at the French canton reorganisation which came into effect in March 2015. Its seat is in Gergy.

It consists of the following communes:

1. Allerey-sur-Saône
2. Bey
3. Les Bordes
4. Bragny-sur-Saône
5. Charnay-lès-Chalon
6. Clux-Villeneuve
7. Damerey
8. Demigny
9. Écuelles
10. Gergy
11. Lessard-le-National
12. Longepierre
13. Mont-lès-Seurre
14. Navilly
15. Palleau
16. Pontoux
17. Saint-Didier-en-Bresse
18. Saint-Gervais-en-Vallière
19. Saint-Loup-Géanges
20. Saint-Martin-en-Gâtinois
21. Saint-Maurice-en-Rivière
22. Sassenay
23. Saunières
24. Sermesse
25. Toutenant
26. Verdun-Ciel
27. Verjux
