= Mont-lès-Seurre =

- Commune
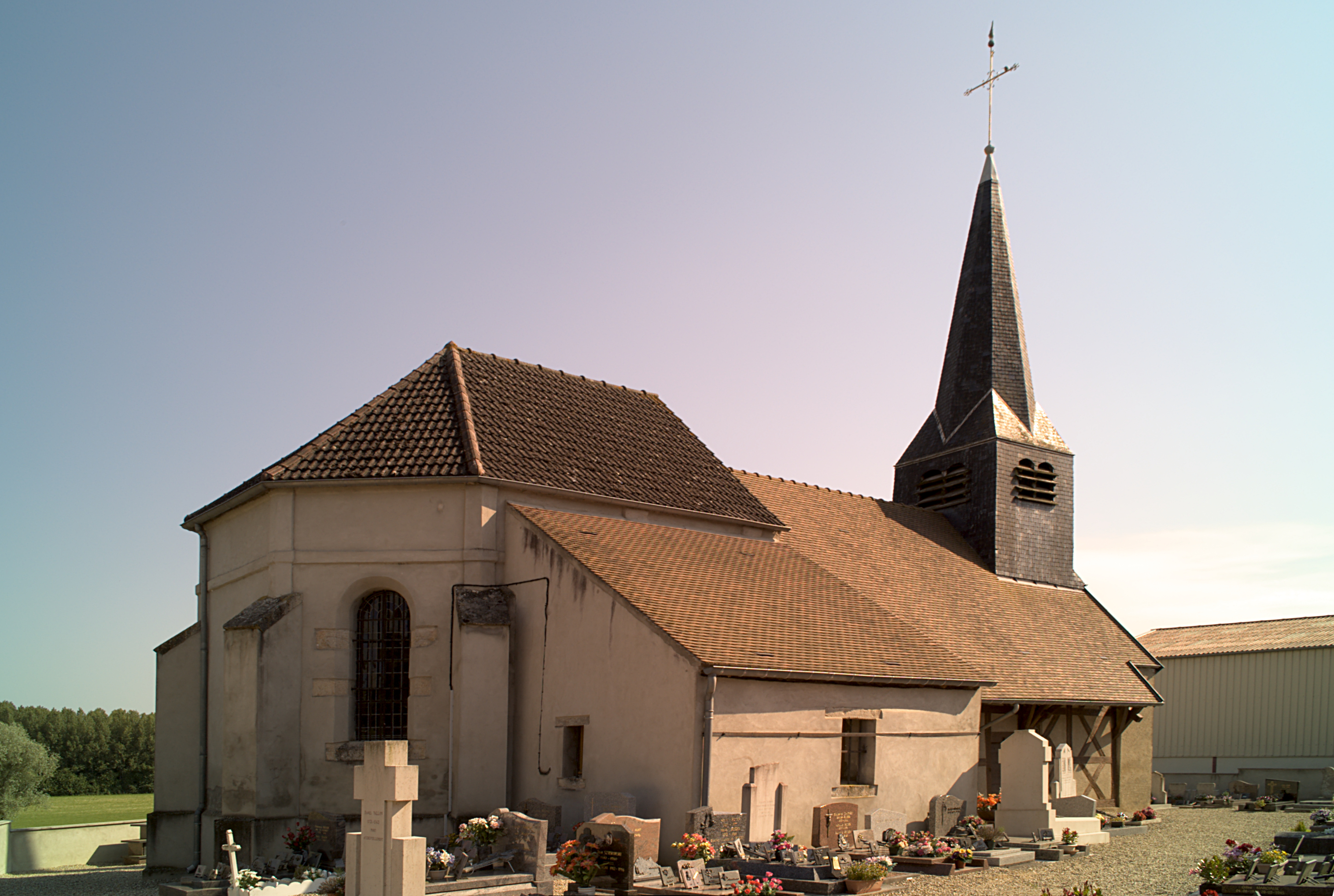
- The church in Mont-lès-Seurre

- Coat of arms
- Location of Mont-lès-Seurre
- Location within France Location within Bourgogne-Franche-Comté
- Coordinates: 46°56′55″N 5°07′21″E
- Country: France
- Region: Bourgogne-Franche-Comté
- Department: Saône-et-Loire
- Arrondissement: Chalon-sur-Saône
- Canton: Gergy

Government
  - Mayor (2025–2026): Sébastien Dodet
- Area^{1}: 6.43 km^{2} (2.48 sq mi)
- Elevation: 180 m (590 ft)
- Highest elevation: 194 m (636 ft)
- Lowest elevation: 174 m (571 ft)
- Population (2023): 189
  - Density: 29.4/km^{2} (76.1/sq mi)
- Time zone: UTC+01:00 (CET)
  - Summer (DST): UTC+02:00 (CEST)
- INSEE/Postal code: 71315 /71270
- ^{1} French Land Register data, which excludes lakes, ponds, glaciers > 1 km^{2} (0.386 sq mi or 247 acres) and river estuaries.

Mont-lès-Seurre (French pronunciation: [mɔ̃ lɛ sœʁ], lit. 'Mont near Seurre') is a commune in the Saône-et-Loire department in the region of Bourgogne-Franche-Comté in eastern France.

== See also ==
- Communes of the Saône-et-Loire department
