= Sassenay =

- Commune
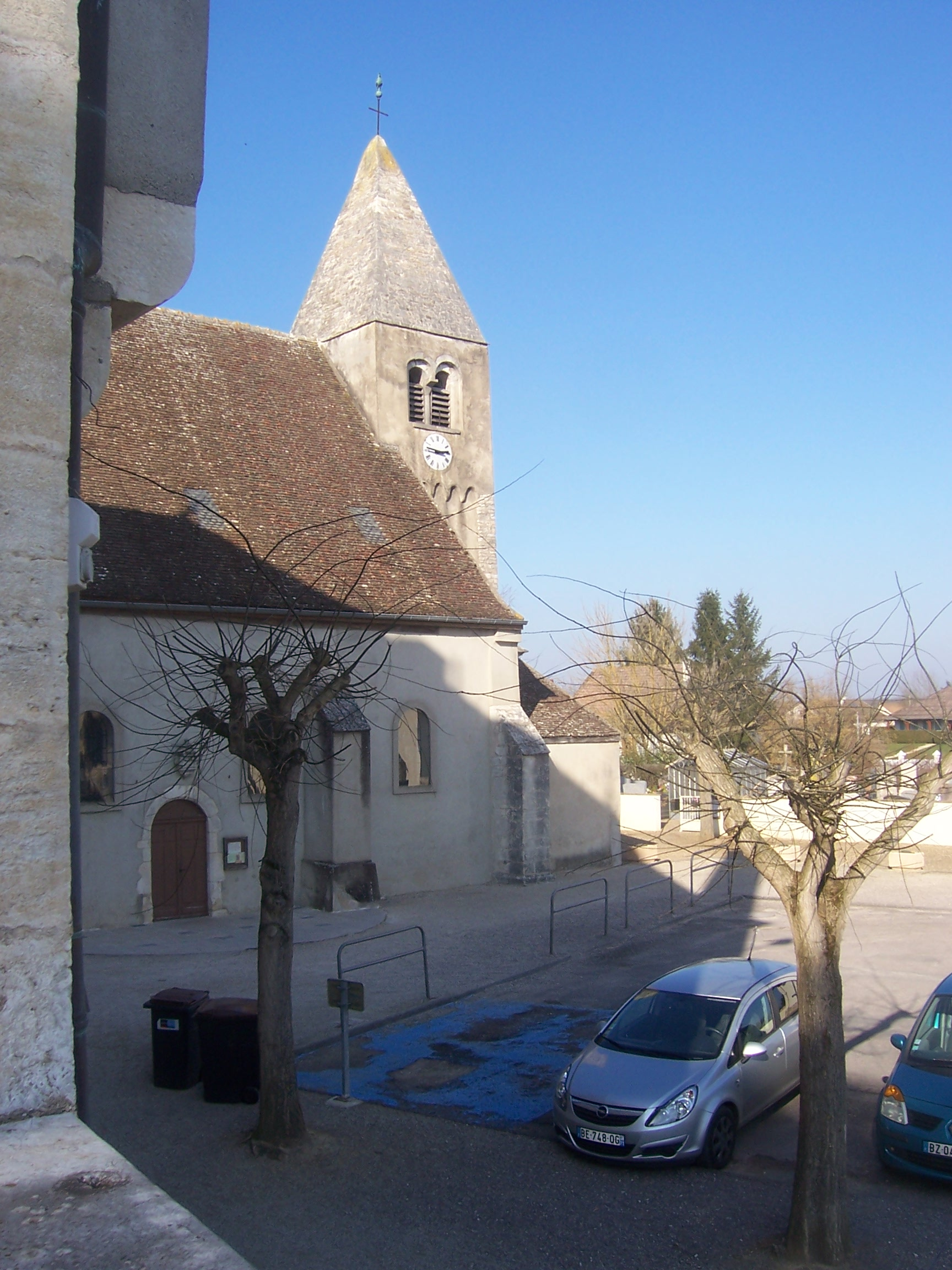
- The church in Sassenay
- Location of Sassenay
- Location within France Location within Bourgogne-Franche-Comté
- Coordinates: 46°49′53″N 4°55′21″E
- Country: France
- Region: Bourgogne-Franche-Comté
- Department: Saône-et-Loire
- Arrondissement: Chalon-sur-Saône
- Canton: Gergy
- Intercommunality: CA Le Grand Chalon

Government
  - Mayor (2020–2026): Didier Réty
- Area^{1}: 18.91 km^{2} (7.30 sq mi)
- Elevation: 192 m (630 ft)
- Highest elevation: 192 m (630 ft)
- Lowest elevation: 172 m (564 ft)
- Population (2023): 1,612
  - Density: 85.25/km^{2} (220.8/sq mi)
- Time zone: UTC+01:00 (CET)
  - Summer (DST): UTC+02:00 (CEST)
- INSEE/Postal code: 71502 /71530
- ^{1} French Land Register data, which excludes lakes, ponds, glaciers > 1 km^{2} (0.386 sq mi or 247 acres) and river estuaries.

Sassenay (French pronunciation: [sasnɛ]) is a commune in the Saône-et-Loire department in the region of Bourgogne-Franche-Comté in eastern France.

== Population ==
Historical population
Year	Pop.	±% p.a.
1968	663	—
1975	870	+3.96%
1982	1,051	+2.74%
1990	1,263	+2.32%
1999	1,402	+1.17%
2007	1,495	+0.81%
2012	1,566	+0.93%
2017	1,587	+0.27%
2023	1,612	+0.26%
Source: INSEE

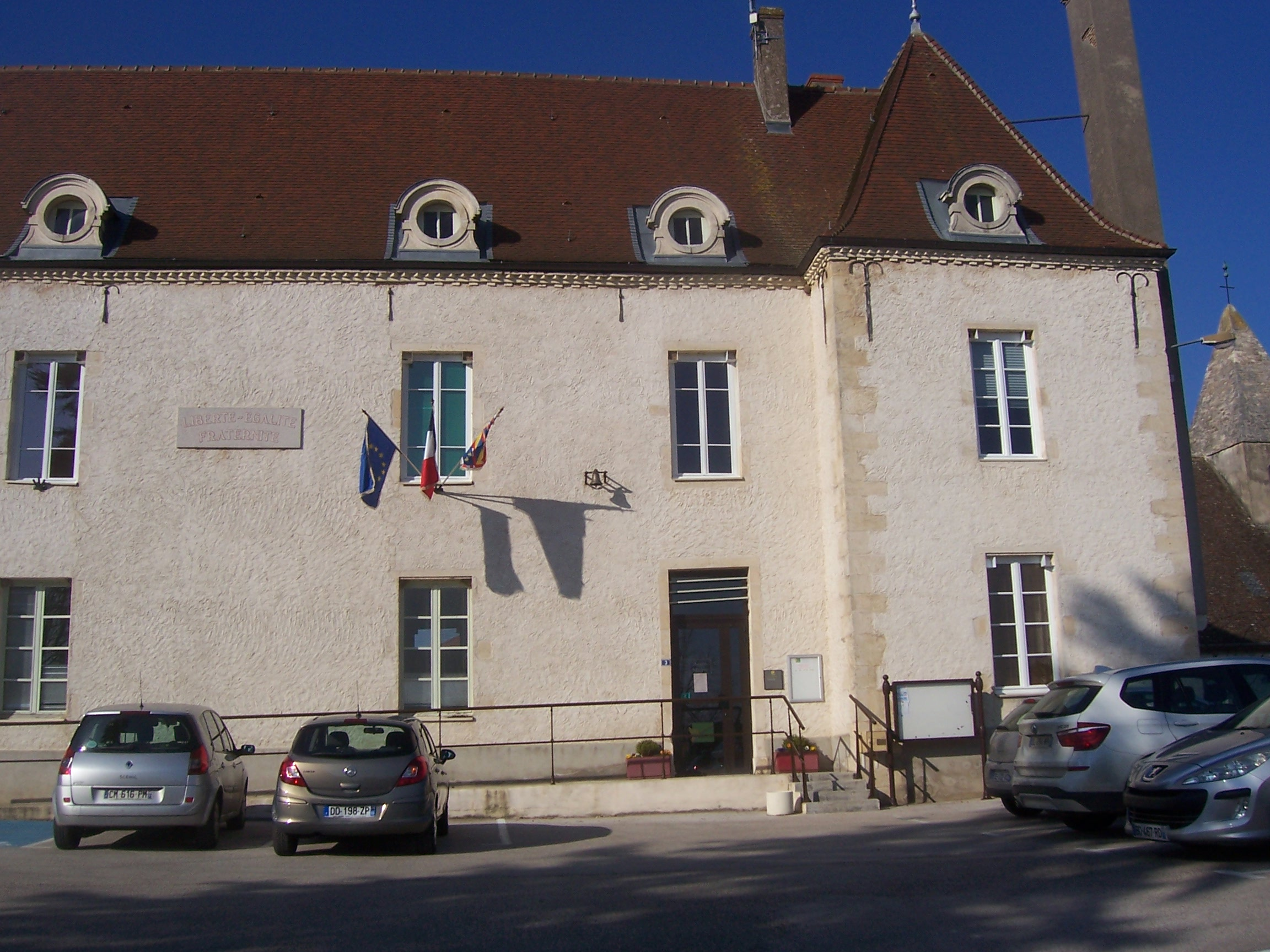
Sassenay town hall

== See also ==
- Communes of the Saône-et-Loire department
