= Saint-Maurice-en-Rivière =

- Commune
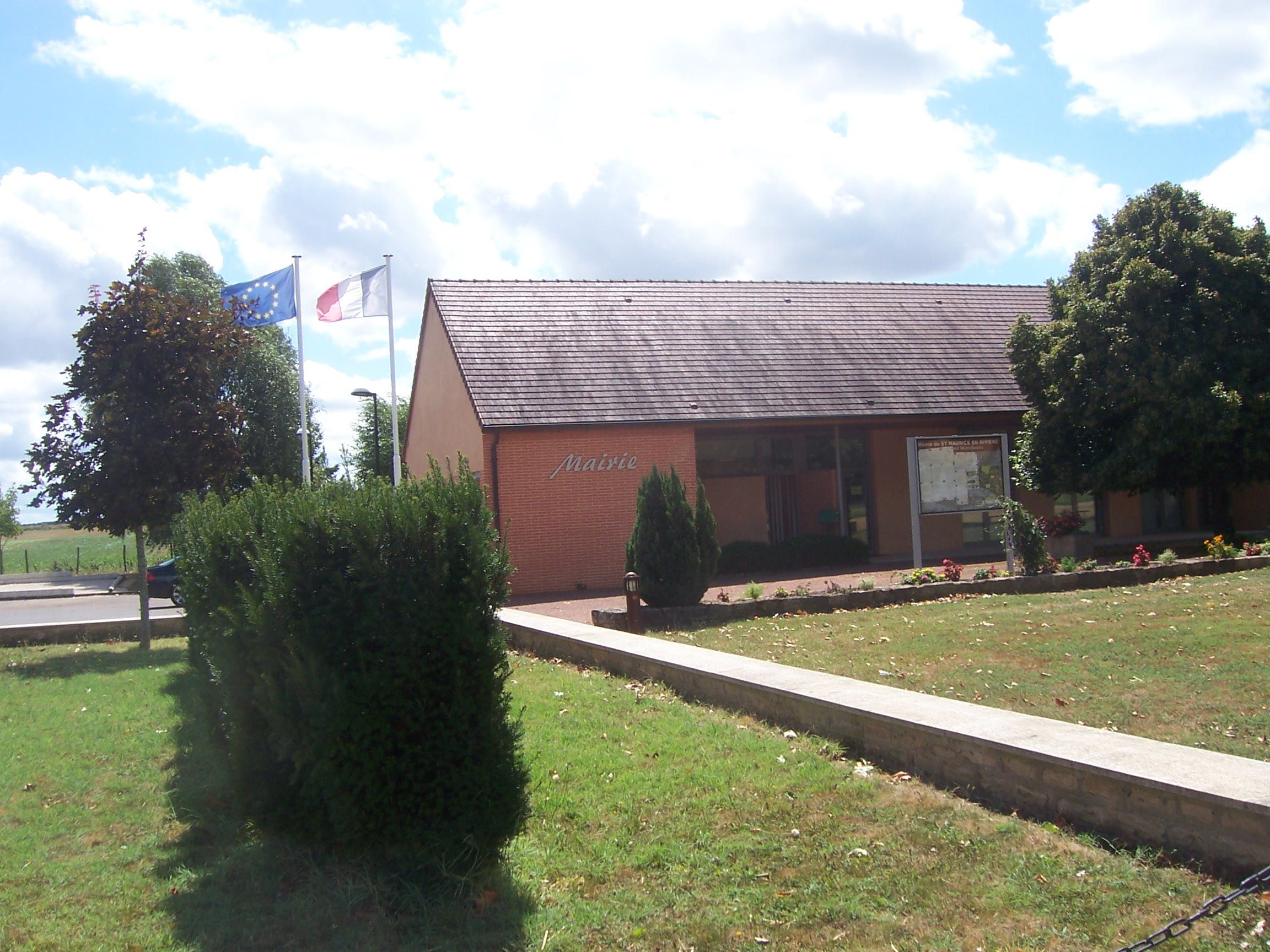
- Town hall

- Coat of arms
- Location of Saint-Maurice-en-Rivière
- Location within France Location within Bourgogne-Franche-Comté
- Coordinates: 46°50′49″N 5°00′22″E
- Country: France
- Region: Bourgogne-Franche-Comté
- Department: Saône-et-Loire
- Arrondissement: Chalon-sur-Saône
- Canton: Gergy
- Area^{1}: 18.57 km^{2} (7.17 sq mi)
- Elevation: 200 m (660 ft)
- Highest elevation: 193 m (633 ft)
- Lowest elevation: 173 m (568 ft)
- Population (2023): 532
  - Density: 28.6/km^{2} (74.2/sq mi)
- Time zone: UTC+01:00 (CET)
  - Summer (DST): UTC+02:00 (CEST)
- INSEE/Postal code: 71462 /71620
- ^{1} French Land Register data, which excludes lakes, ponds, glaciers > 1 km^{2} (0.386 sq mi or 247 acres) and river estuaries.

Saint-Maurice-en-Rivière is a commune in the Saône-et-Loire department in the region of Bourgogne-Franche-Comté in eastern France.

== See also ==
- Communes of the Saône-et-Loire department
