= Charnay-lès-Chalon =

- Commune
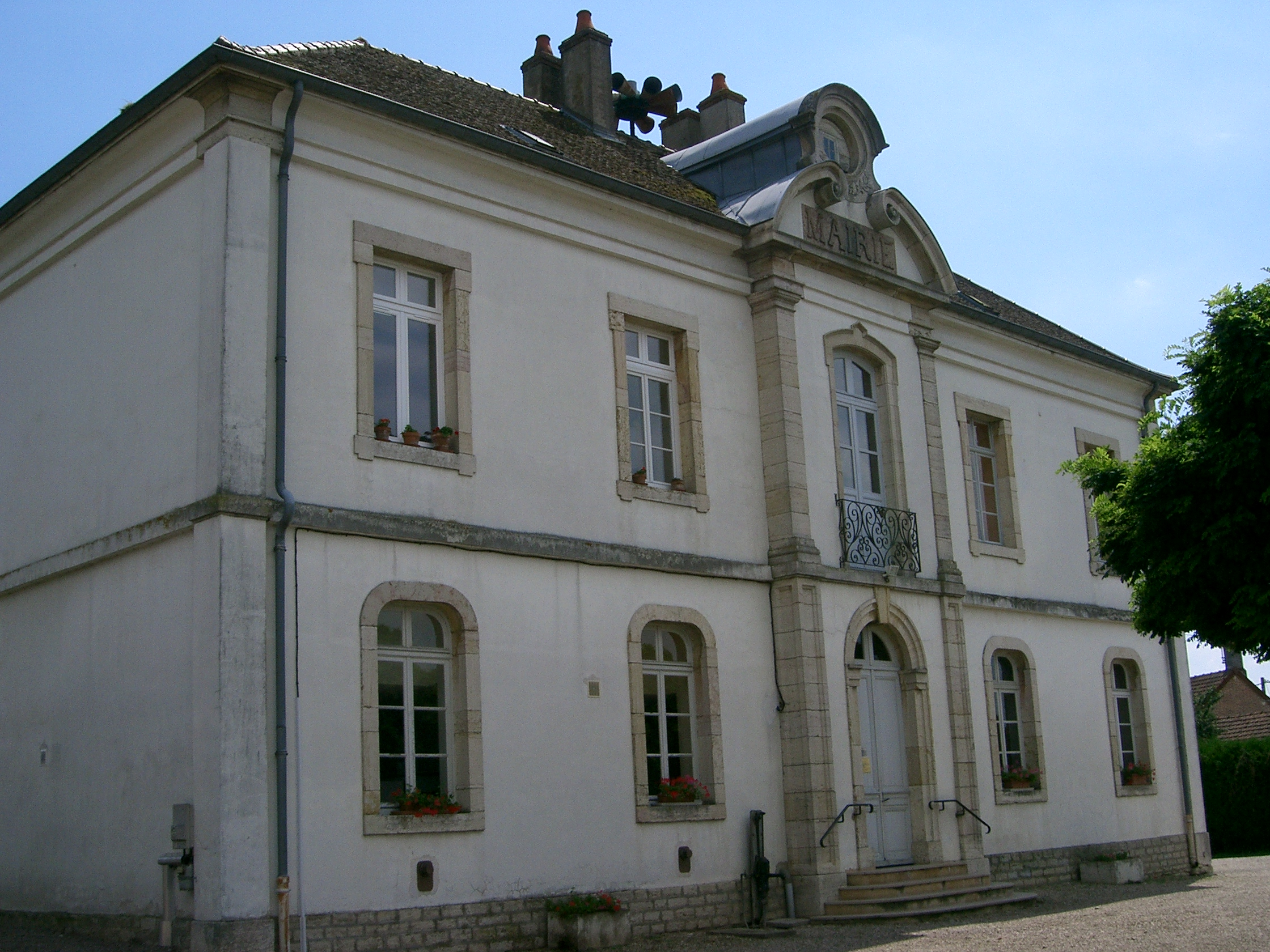
- The town hall and school in Charnay-lès-Chalon
- Location of Charnay-lès-Chalon
- Location within France Location within Bourgogne-Franche-Comté
- Coordinates: 46°56′22″N 5°05′37″E
- Country: France
- Region: Bourgogne-Franche-Comté
- Department: Saône-et-Loire
- Arrondissement: Chalon-sur-Saône
- Canton: Gergy
- Area^{1}: 9.24 km^{2} (3.57 sq mi)
- Elevation: 112 m (367 ft)
- Highest elevation: 188 m (617 ft)
- Lowest elevation: 172 m (564 ft)
- Population (2023): 197
  - Density: 21.3/km^{2} (55.2/sq mi)
- Time zone: UTC+01:00 (CET)
  - Summer (DST): UTC+02:00 (CEST)
- INSEE/Postal code: 71104 /71350
- ^{1} French Land Register data, which excludes lakes, ponds, glaciers > 1 km^{2} (0.386 sq mi or 247 acres) and river estuaries.

Charnay-lès-Chalon (French pronunciation: [ʃaʁnɛ lɛ ʃalɔ̃]) is a commune in the Saône-et-Loire department in the region of Bourgogne-Franche-Comté in eastern France.

== See also ==
- Communes of the Saône-et-Loire department
