= Gergy =

- Commune
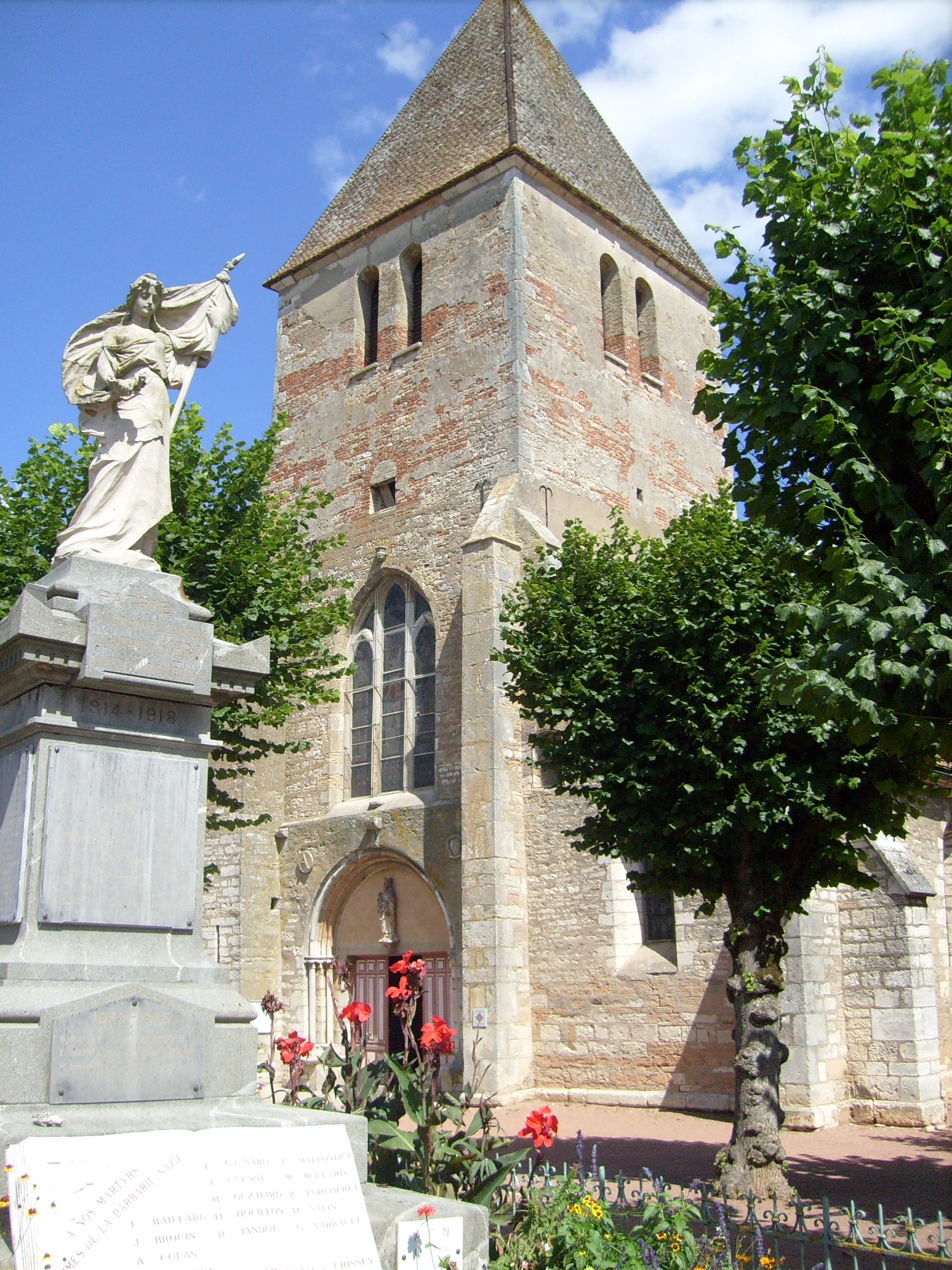
- The church in Gergy
- Location of Gergy
- Location within France Location within Bourgogne-Franche-Comté
- Coordinates: 46°52′39″N 4°56′51″E
- Country: France
- Region: Bourgogne-Franche-Comté
- Department: Saône-et-Loire
- Arrondissement: Chalon-sur-Saône
- Canton: Gergy
- Intercommunality: CA Le Grand Chalon

Government
  - Mayor (2020–2026): Philippe Fournier
- Area^{1}: 38.84 km^{2} (15.00 sq mi)
- Elevation: 189 m (620 ft)
- Highest elevation: 208 m (682 ft)
- Lowest elevation: 172 m (564 ft)
- Population (2023): 2,566
  - Density: 66.07/km^{2} (171.1/sq mi)
- Time zone: UTC+01:00 (CET)
  - Summer (DST): UTC+02:00 (CEST)
- INSEE/Postal code: 71215 /71590
- ^{1} French Land Register data, which excludes lakes, ponds, glaciers > 1 km^{2} (0.386 sq mi or 247 acres) and river estuaries.

Gergy (French pronunciation: [ʒɛʁʒi]) is a commune in the Saône-et-Loire department in the region of Bourgogne-Franche-Comté in eastern France.

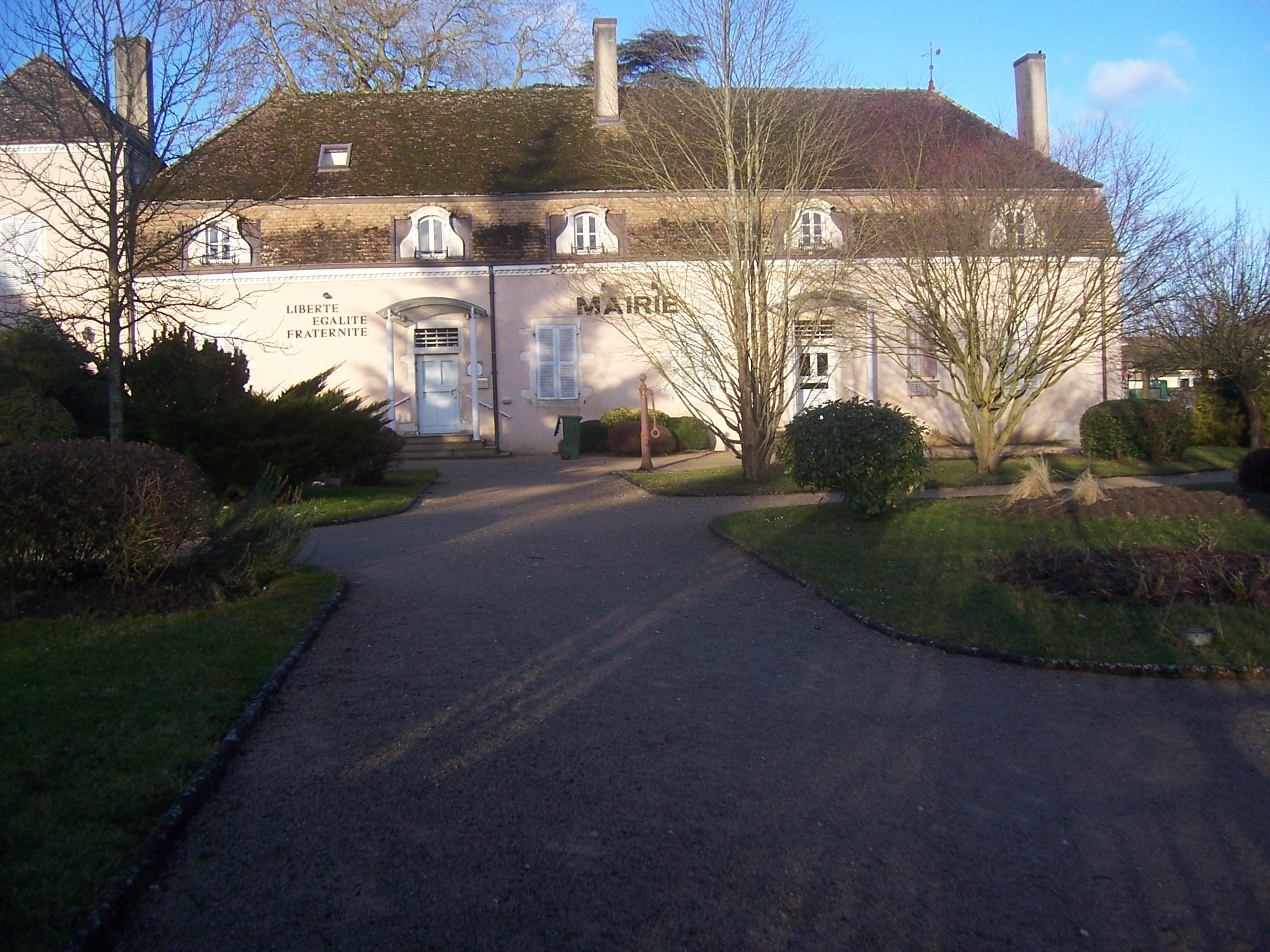
Gergy Town hall

== Population ==
Historical population
Year	Pop.	±% p.a.
1968	1,454	—
1975	1,618	+1.54%
1982	1,925	+2.51%
1990	2,017	+0.59%
1999	2,248	+1.21%
2007	2,478	+1.23%
2012	2,568	+0.72%
2017	2,545	−0.18%
2023	2,566	+0.14%
Source: INSEE

== See also ==
- Communes of the Saône-et-Loire department
