= Demigny =

- Commune
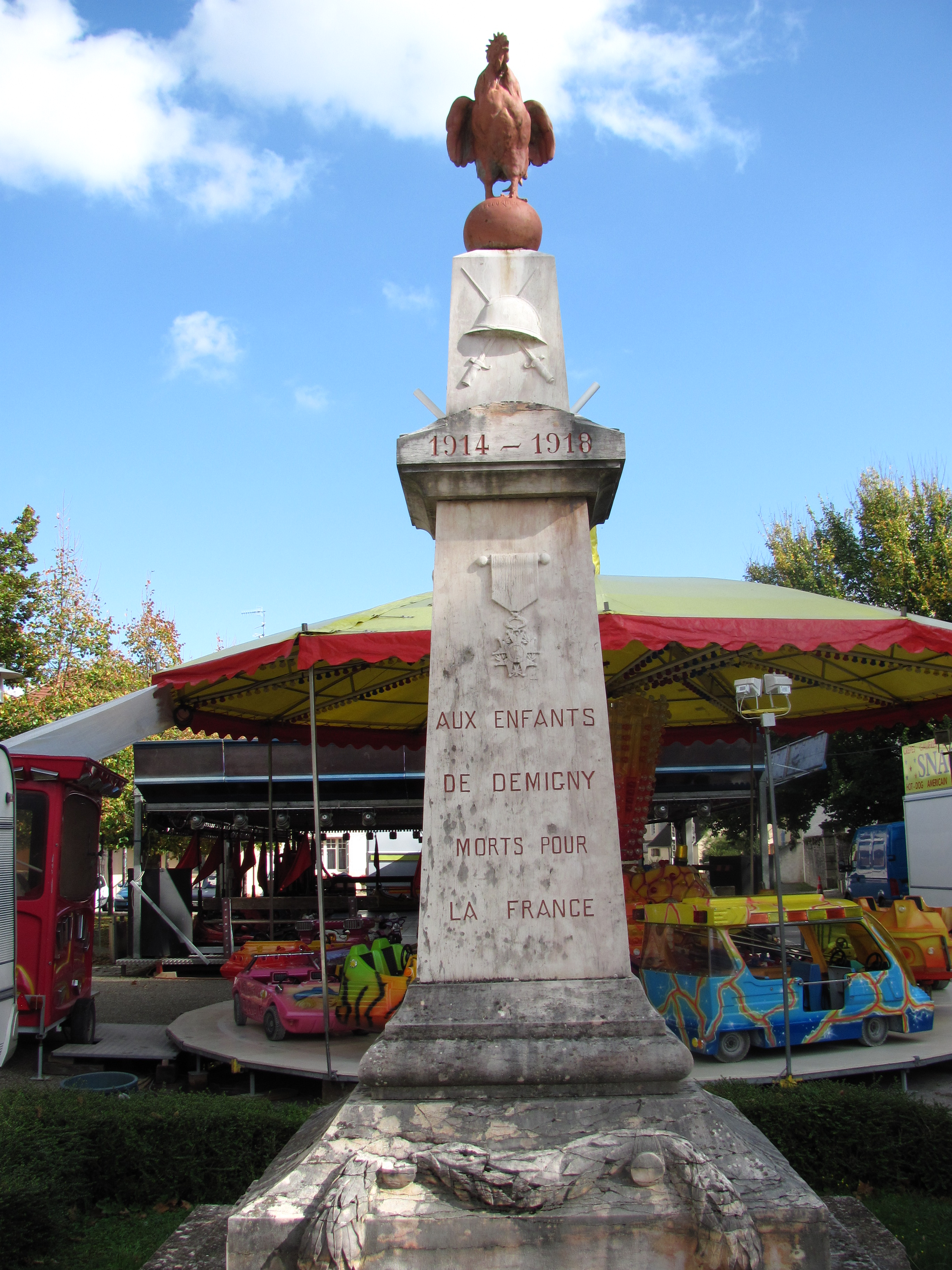
- War memorial

- Coat of arms
- Location of Demigny
- Location within France Location within Bourgogne-Franche-Comté
- Coordinates: 46°55′41″N 4°50′05″E
- Country: France
- Region: Bourgogne-Franche-Comté
- Department: Saône-et-Loire
- Arrondissement: Chalon-sur-Saône
- Canton: Gergy
- Intercommunality: CA Le Grand Chalon

Government
  - Mayor (2020–2026): Marie-Claire Dilly
- Area^{1}: 29.63 km^{2} (11.44 sq mi)
- Elevation: 213 m (699 ft)
- Highest elevation: 231 m (758 ft)
- Lowest elevation: 188 m (617 ft)
- Population (2023): 1,756
  - Density: 59.26/km^{2} (153.5/sq mi)
- Time zone: UTC+01:00 (CET)
  - Summer (DST): UTC+02:00 (CEST)
- INSEE/Postal code: 71170 /71150
- ^{1} French Land Register data, which excludes lakes, ponds, glaciers > 1 km^{2} (0.386 sq mi or 247 acres) and river estuaries.

Demigny (French pronunciation: [dəmiɲi]) is a commune in the Saône-et-Loire department in the region of Bourgogne-Franche-Comté in eastern France.

== See also ==
- Communes of the Saône-et-Loire department
