= Bragny-sur-Saône =

- Commune
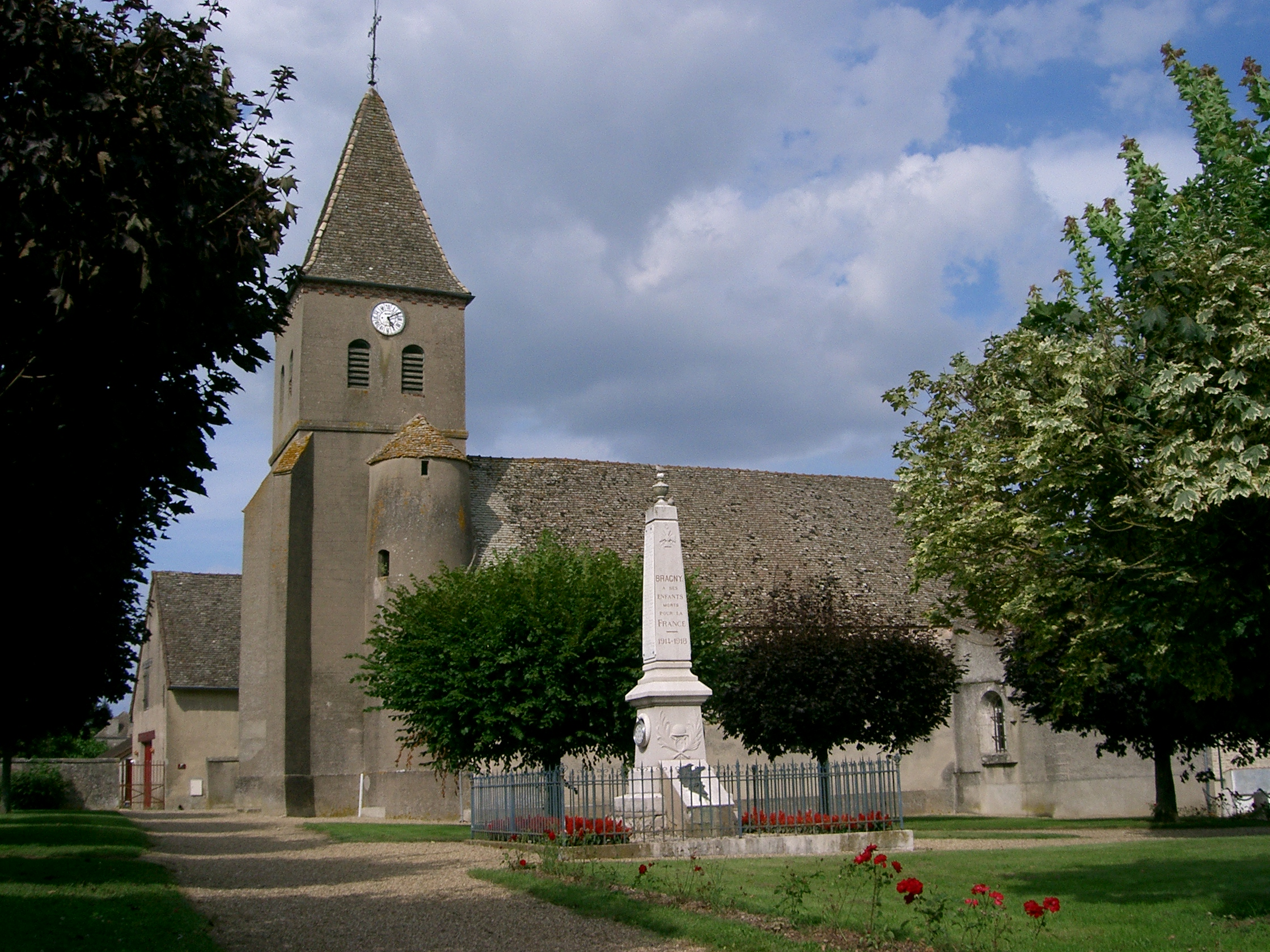
- The church in Bragny-sur-Saône
- Location of Bragny-sur-Saône
- Location within France Location within Bourgogne-Franche-Comté
- Coordinates: 46°54′41″N 5°01′54″E
- Country: France
- Region: Bourgogne-Franche-Comté
- Department: Saône-et-Loire
- Arrondissement: Chalon-sur-Saône
- Canton: Gergy
- Area^{1}: 14.79 km^{2} (5.71 sq mi)
- Elevation: 200 m (660 ft)
- Highest elevation: 206 m (676 ft)
- Lowest elevation: 172 m (564 ft)
- Population (2023): 667
  - Density: 45.1/km^{2} (117/sq mi)
- Time zone: UTC+01:00 (CET)
  - Summer (DST): UTC+02:00 (CEST)
- INSEE/Postal code: 71054 /71350
- ^{1} French Land Register data, which excludes lakes, ponds, glaciers > 1 km^{2} (0.386 sq mi or 247 acres) and river estuaries.

Bragny-sur-Saône (French pronunciation: [bʁaɲi syʁ son], literally Bragny on Saône) is a commune in the Saône-et-Loire department in the region of Bourgogne-Franche-Comté in eastern France.

== History ==
=== BC ===
From 530 to 450 or 440 BC there was considerable trade conducted in this area between the Hallstatt people and the Greeks. Mediterranean pottery, including amphorae from Massalia, as well as artefacts from Attica, and polychrome glass have all been found in large numbers here. Trade eased up for a while in the early 5th century BC but soon sprung back into life. Artefacts from northern Italy, as well as Golaseccan pottery were found from this time onwards, along with more Massiliot amphorae.

=== 17th Century ===
In August 1636, the soldiers of Matthias Gallas burned the village center, church, and part of the château. Rebuilding was needed, and it was the Count of Thiard who had most of it done since the population were too poor.

By 1690, most residents lived in small brick and mud houses, roofed with tiles or straw. They also usually slept in straw on the ground.

=== Barre Mill ===
A mill has existed here since before 1243. Peasants of Bragny and surrounding villages would come to the mill and pay the owner to have their grains ground.

Pontus de Tyard, a famous owner of the mill, wrote letters detailing how the millers would cheat him by paying late, and also cheat the peasants by withholding flour.

In 1740, Jacques de Thiard began reconstruction of the mill.

== Municipal Council ==
The mayor of Bragny is Estelle Invernizzi.

The other councilors are as follows:

- Chantale Hélène Aublanc
- Chloé Authevelle
- Marie-Thérèse Authevelle
- Laurent Bernard
- Yohann Calbris
- Patrick Janin
- Chantal Lacour
- Pierre Large
- Cédric Lory
- Vincent Tartarin

They were all elected in 2020.

== Population ==
Population History
1876	1881	1886	1891	1896	1901	1906	1911	1921	1926	1931	1936	1954	1962	1968	1975	1982	1990	1999	2006	2007	2008	2009	2010	2011	2012	2013	2014	2015	2016	2017	2018	2019	2020	2021
920	923	940	859	769	742	776	669	539	563	555	542	473	436	452	422	447	467	464	560	574	587	590	588	587	586	581	573	600	626	652	659	685	696	686

== See also ==
- Communes of the Saône-et-Loire department
