= Verjux =

- Commune
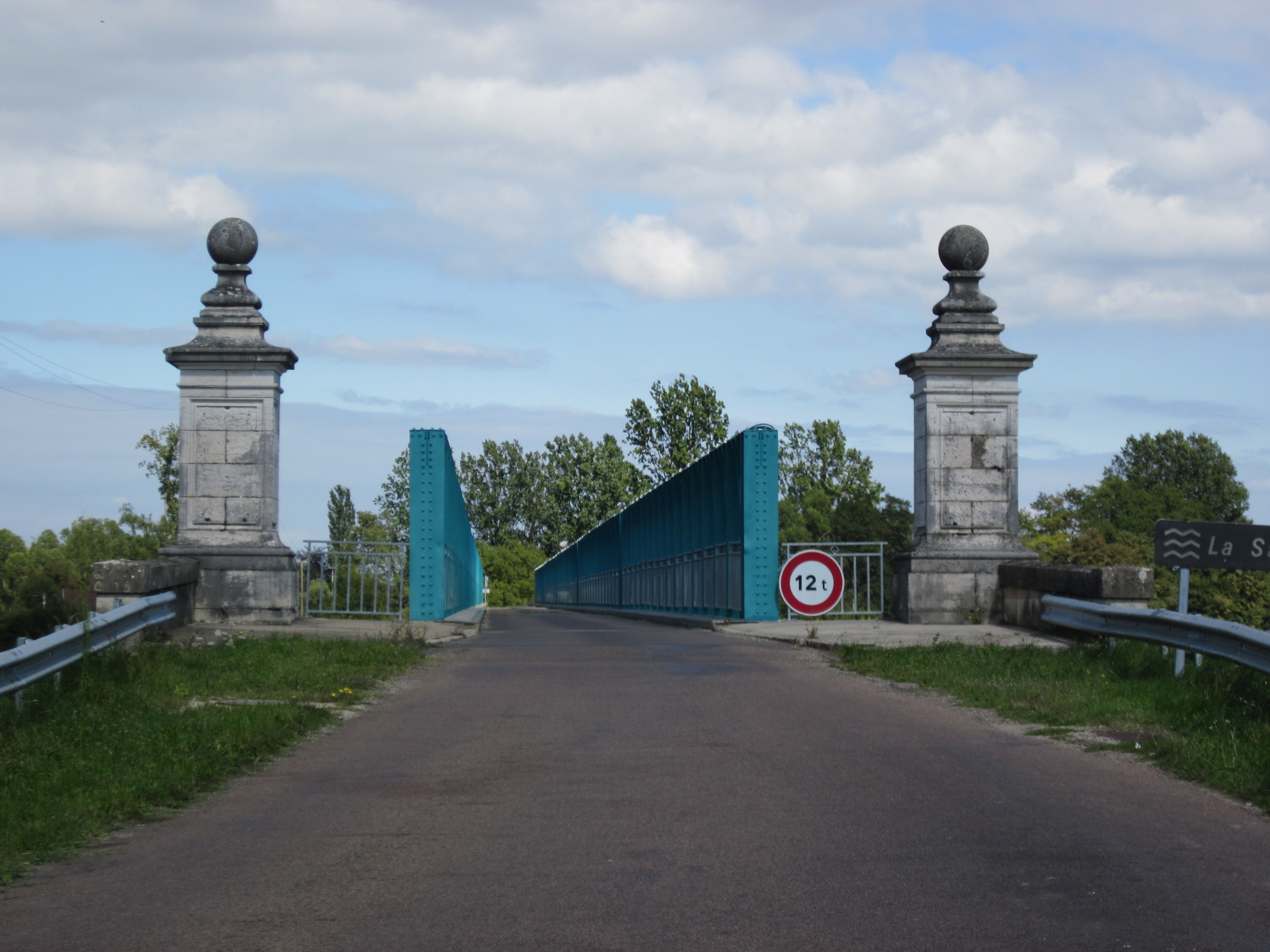
- The bridge in Verjux
- Location of Verjux
- Location within France Location within Bourgogne-Franche-Comté
- Coordinates: 46°52′50″N 4°57′51″E
- Country: France
- Region: Bourgogne-Franche-Comté
- Department: Saône-et-Loire
- Arrondissement: Chalon-sur-Saône
- Canton: Gergy

Government
  - Mayor (2022–2026): Andrée Bonin
- Area^{1}: 12.09 km^{2} (4.67 sq mi)
- Elevation: 178 m (584 ft)
- Highest elevation: 176 m (577 ft)
- Lowest elevation: 173 m (568 ft)
- Population (2023): 504
  - Density: 41.7/km^{2} (108/sq mi)
- Time zone: UTC+01:00 (CET)
  - Summer (DST): UTC+02:00 (CEST)
- INSEE/Postal code: 71570 /71590
- ^{1} French Land Register data, which excludes lakes, ponds, glaciers > 1 km^{2} (0.386 sq mi or 247 acres) and river estuaries.

Verjux is a commune in the Saône-et-Loire department in the region of Bourgogne-Franche-Comté in eastern France.

== See also ==
- Communes of the Saône-et-Loire department
