= Pontoux =

- Commune
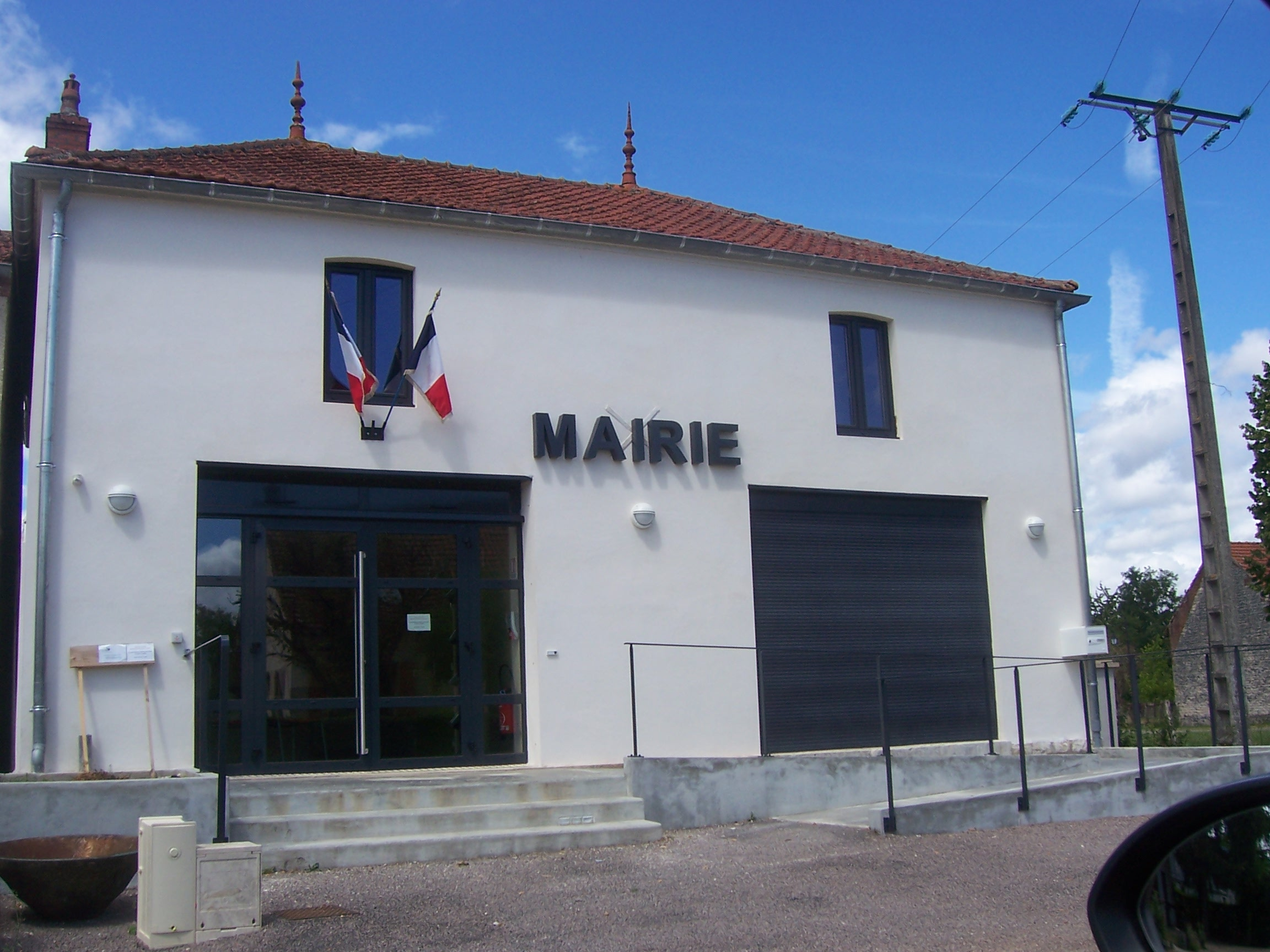
- Town hall

- Coat of arms
- Location of Pontoux
- Location within France Location within Bourgogne-Franche-Comté
- Coordinates: 46°55′30″N 5°06′36″E
- Country: France
- Region: Bourgogne-Franche-Comté
- Department: Saône-et-Loire
- Arrondissement: Chalon-sur-Saône
- Canton: Gergy
- Area^{1}: 13.77 km^{2} (5.32 sq mi)
- Elevation: 287 m (942 ft)
- Highest elevation: 194 m (636 ft)
- Lowest elevation: 174 m (571 ft)
- Population (2023): 276
  - Density: 20.0/km^{2} (51.9/sq mi)
- Time zone: UTC+01:00 (CET)
  - Summer (DST): UTC+02:00 (CEST)
- INSEE/Postal code: 71355 /71270
- ^{1} French Land Register data, which excludes lakes, ponds, glaciers > 1 km^{2} (0.386 sq mi or 247 acres) and river estuaries.

Pontoux (French pronunciation: [pɔ̃tu]) is a commune in the Saône-et-Loire department in the region of Bourgogne-Franche-Comté in eastern France.

It was probably the Roman Pons Dubis.

== See also ==
- Communes of the Saône-et-Loire department
