= Bey, Saône-et-Loire =

Bey
- Commune
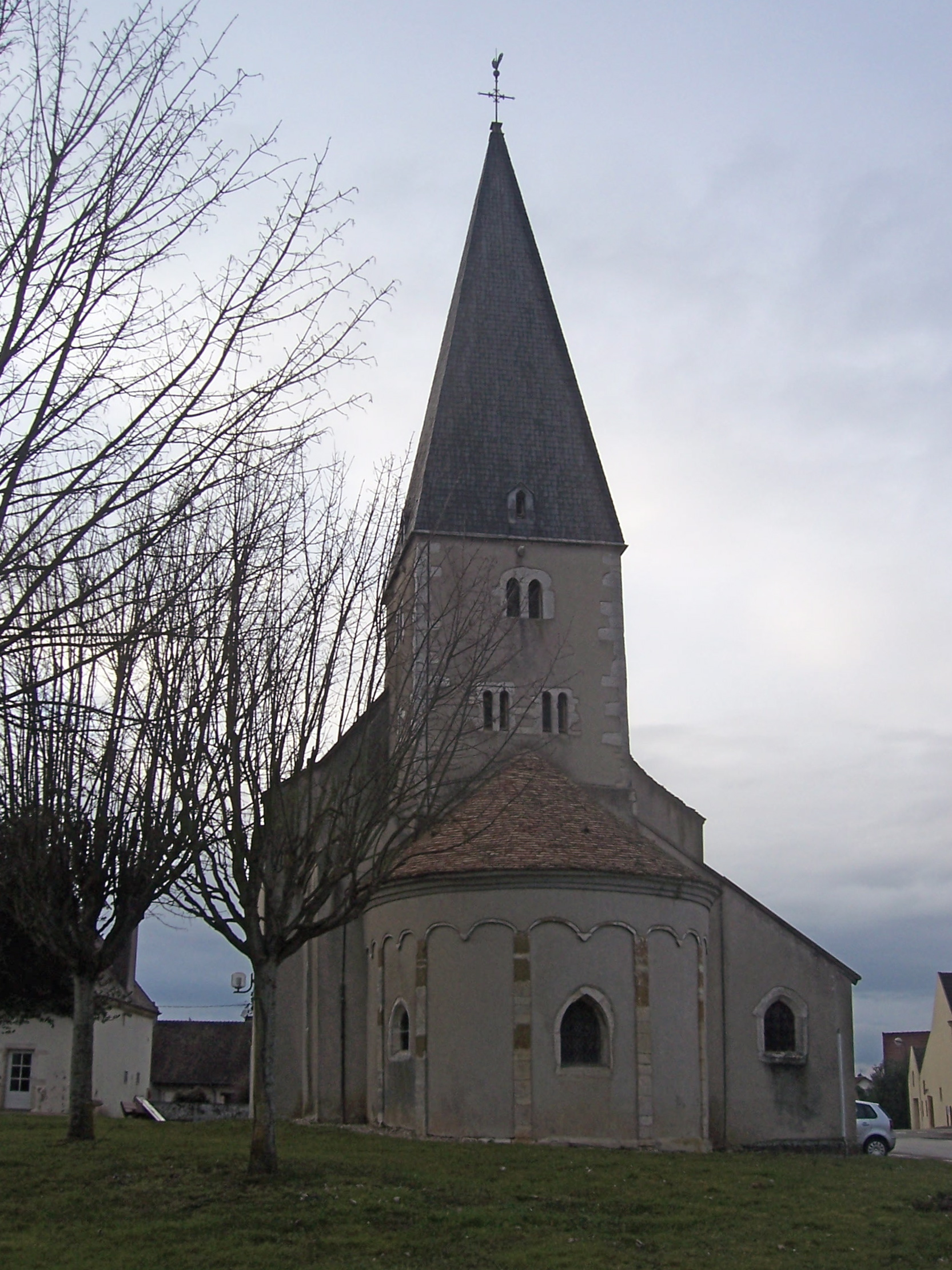

- Coat of arms
- Location of Bey
- Location within France Location within Bourgogne-Franche-Comté
- Coordinates: 46°49′19″N 4°57′51″E
- Country: France
- Region: Bourgogne-Franche-Comté
- Department: Saône-et-Loire
- Arrondissement: Chalon-sur-Saône
- Canton: Gergy
- Intercommunality: Saône Doubs Bresse
- Area^{1}: 8.92 km^{2} (3.44 sq mi)
- Elevation: 200 m (660 ft)
- Highest elevation: 206 m (676 ft)
- Lowest elevation: 174 m (571 ft)
- Population (2023): 870
  - Density: 98/km^{2} (250/sq mi)
- Time zone: UTC+01:00 (CET)
  - Summer (DST): UTC+02:00 (CEST)
- INSEE/Postal code: 71033 /71620
- ^{1} French Land Register data, which excludes lakes, ponds, glaciers > 1 km^{2} (0.386 sq mi or 247 acres) and river estuaries.

Bey (French pronunciation: [bɛ]) is a commune in the Saône-et-Loire department in the region of Bourgogne-Franche-Comté in central-eastern France.

== Population ==
Historical population
Year	Pop.	±% p.a.
1968	353	—
1975	388	+1.36%
1982	504	+3.81%
1990	554	+1.19%
1999	633	+1.49%
2007	760	+2.31%
2012	790	+0.78%
2017	845	+1.36%
2023	870	+0.49%
Source: INSEE

== See also ==
- Communes of the Saône-et-Loire department
