= Saint-Didier-en-Bresse =

- Commune
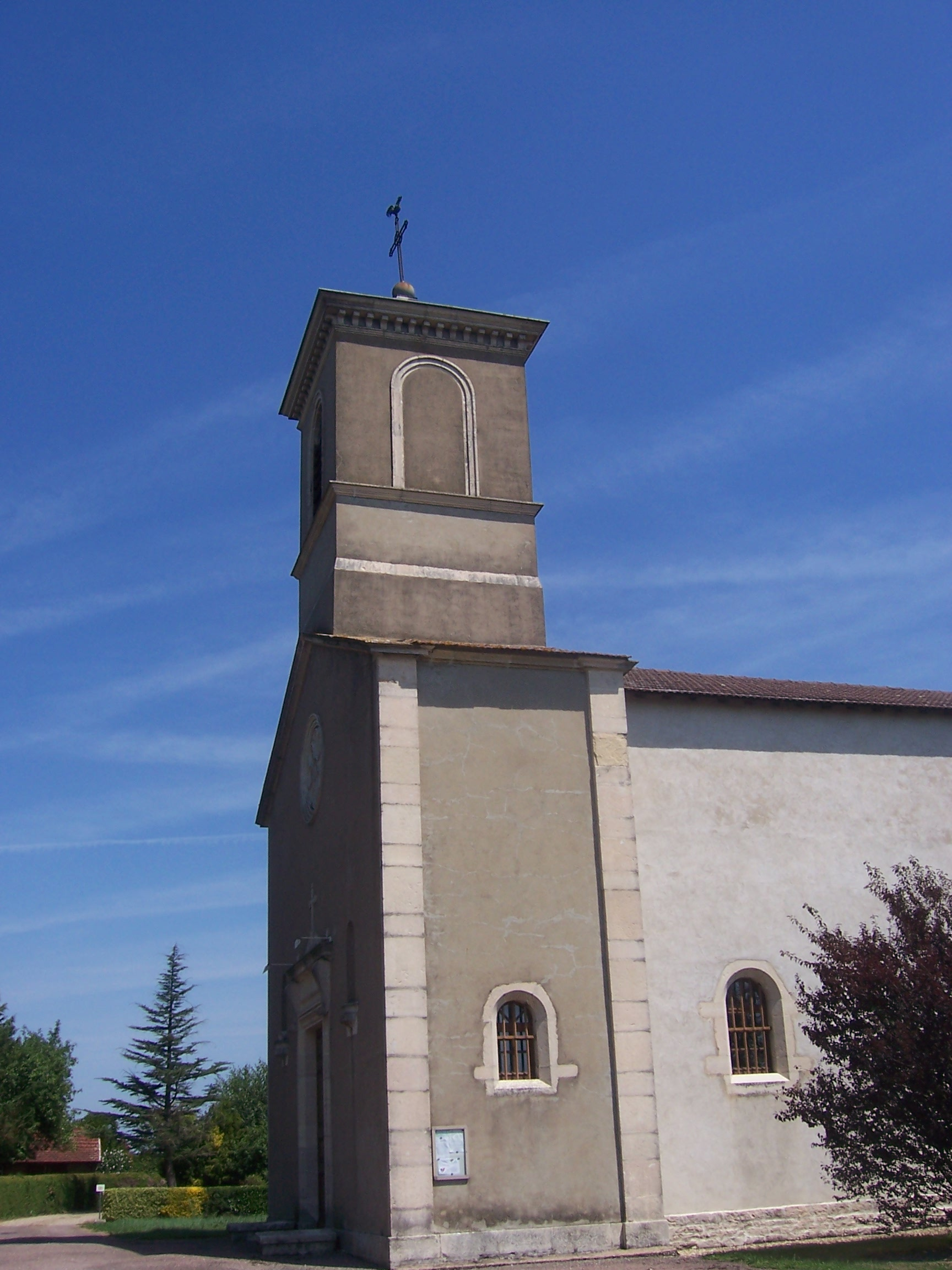
- The church in Saint-Didier-en-Bresse
- Location of Saint-Didier-en-Bresse
- Location within France Location within Bourgogne-Franche-Comté
- Coordinates: 46°51′14″N 5°05′30″E
- Country: France
- Region: Bourgogne-Franche-Comté
- Department: Saône-et-Loire
- Arrondissement: Chalon-sur-Saône
- Canton: Gergy

Government
  - Mayor (2023–2026): Eve Michelin
- Area^{1}: 11.29 km^{2} (4.36 sq mi)
- Elevation: 191 m (627 ft)
- Highest elevation: 193 m (633 ft)
- Lowest elevation: 177 m (581 ft)
- Population (2023): 177
  - Density: 15.7/km^{2} (40.6/sq mi)
- Time zone: UTC+01:00 (CET)
  - Summer (DST): UTC+02:00 (CEST)
- INSEE/Postal code: 71405 /71620
- ^{1} French Land Register data, which excludes lakes, ponds, glaciers > 1 km^{2} (0.386 sq mi or 247 acres) and river estuaries.

Saint-Didier-en-Bresse (French pronunciation: [sɛ̃ didje ɑ̃ bʁɛs], literally Saint-Didier in Bresse) is a commune in the Saône-et-Loire department in the region of Bourgogne-Franche-Comté in eastern France.

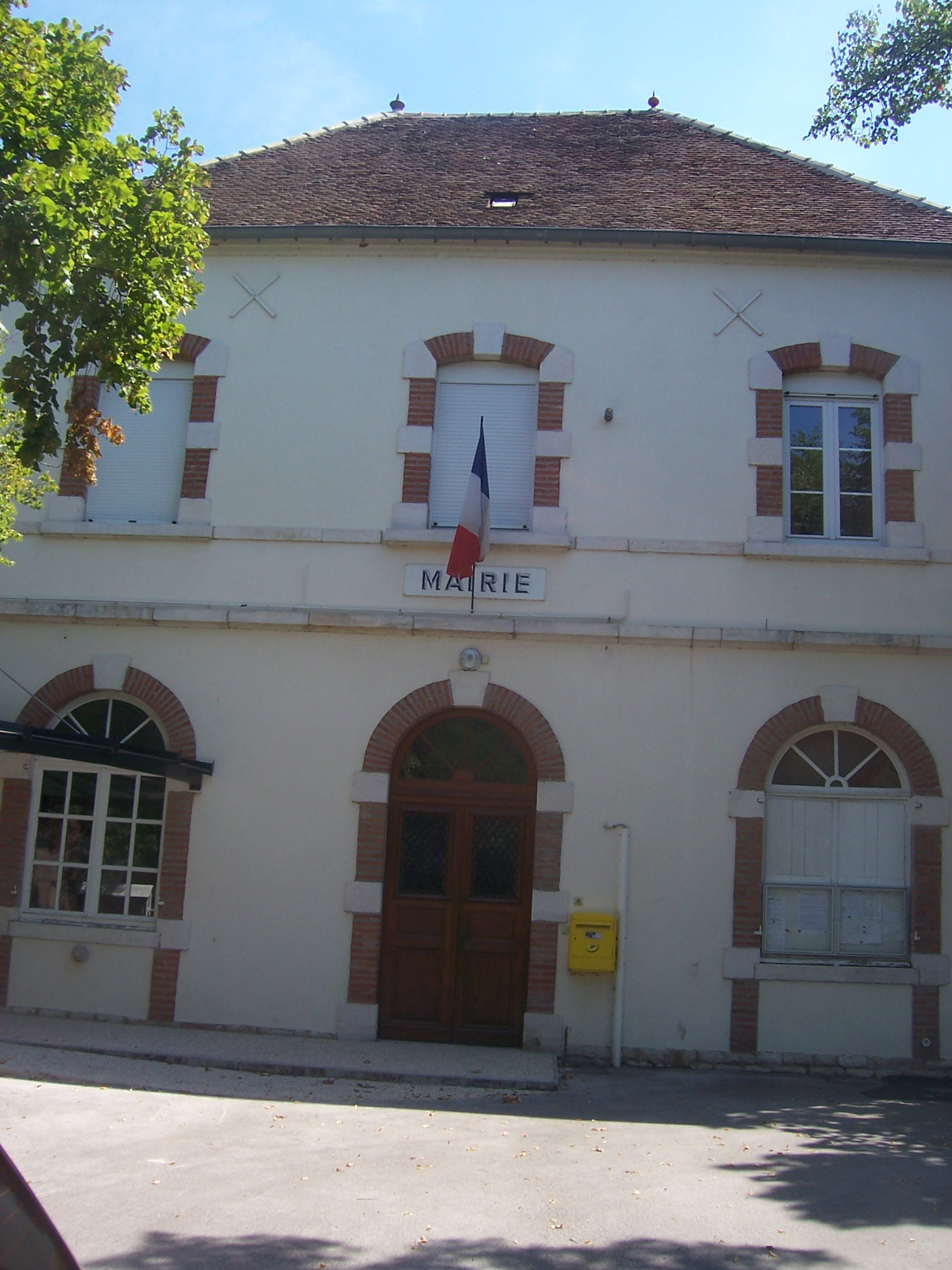
Town hall

== See also ==
- Communes of the Saône-et-Loire department
