= Palleau =

- Commune
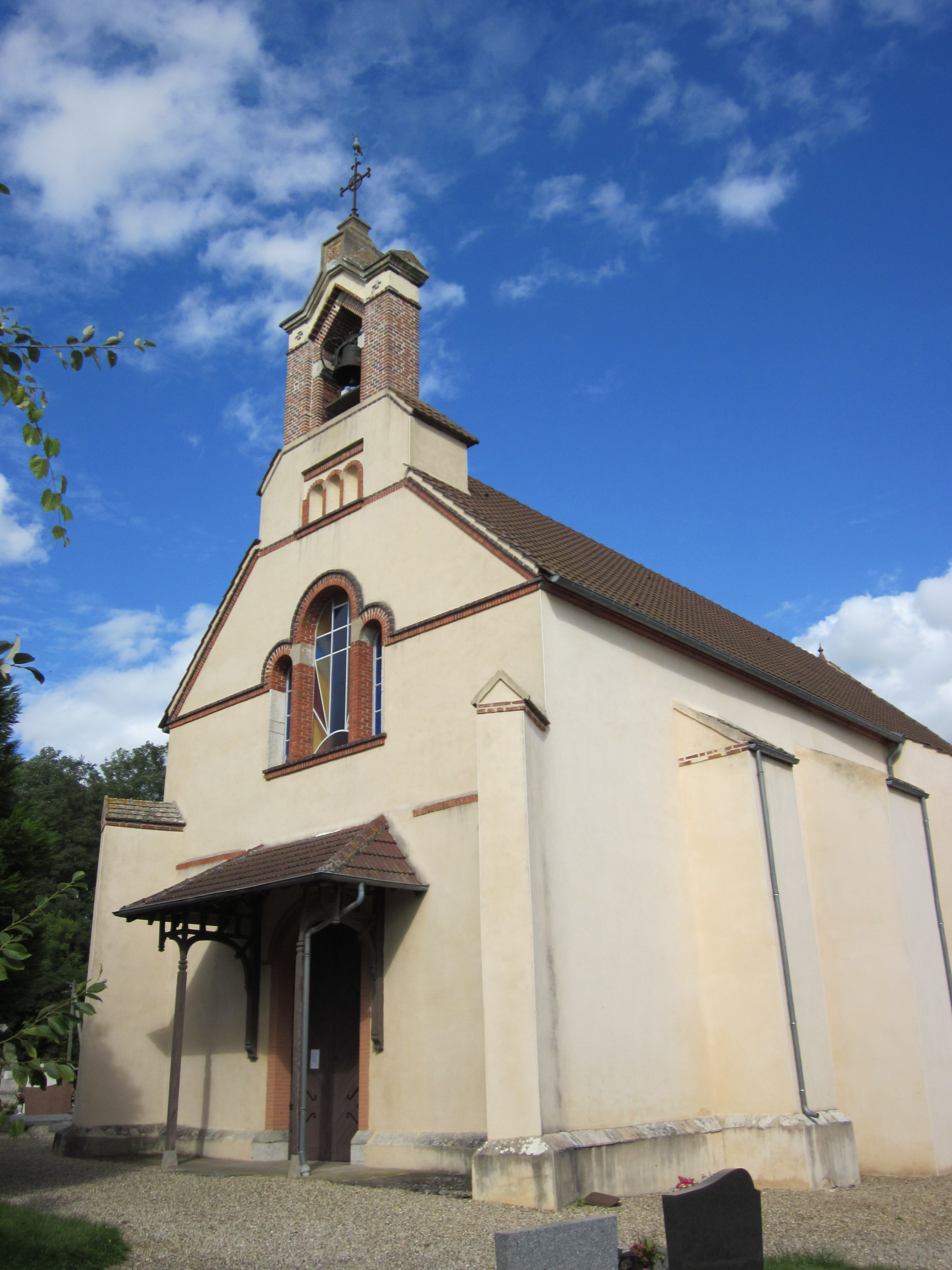
- The church in Palleau
- Location of Palleau
- Location within France Location within Bourgogne-Franche-Comté
- Coordinates: 46°57′26″N 5°01′50″E
- Country: France
- Region: Bourgogne-Franche-Comté
- Department: Saône-et-Loire
- Arrondissement: Chalon-sur-Saône
- Canton: Gergy

Government
  - Mayor (2020–2026): Olivier Ciavaldini
- Area^{1}: 10.68 km^{2} (4.12 sq mi)
- Elevation: 190 m (620 ft)
- Highest elevation: 205 m (673 ft)
- Lowest elevation: 175 m (574 ft)
- Population (2023): 247
  - Density: 23.1/km^{2} (59.9/sq mi)
- Time zone: UTC+01:00 (CET)
  - Summer (DST): UTC+02:00 (CEST)
- INSEE/Postal code: 71341 /71350
- ^{1} French Land Register data, which excludes lakes, ponds, glaciers > 1 km^{2} (0.386 sq mi or 247 acres) and river estuaries.

Palleau (French pronunciation: [palo]) is a commune in the Saône-et-Loire department in the region of Bourgogne-Franche-Comté in eastern France.

In 2023 the municipality had 247 inhabitants.

== See also ==
- Communes of the Saône-et-Loire department
