= Saunières =

- Commune
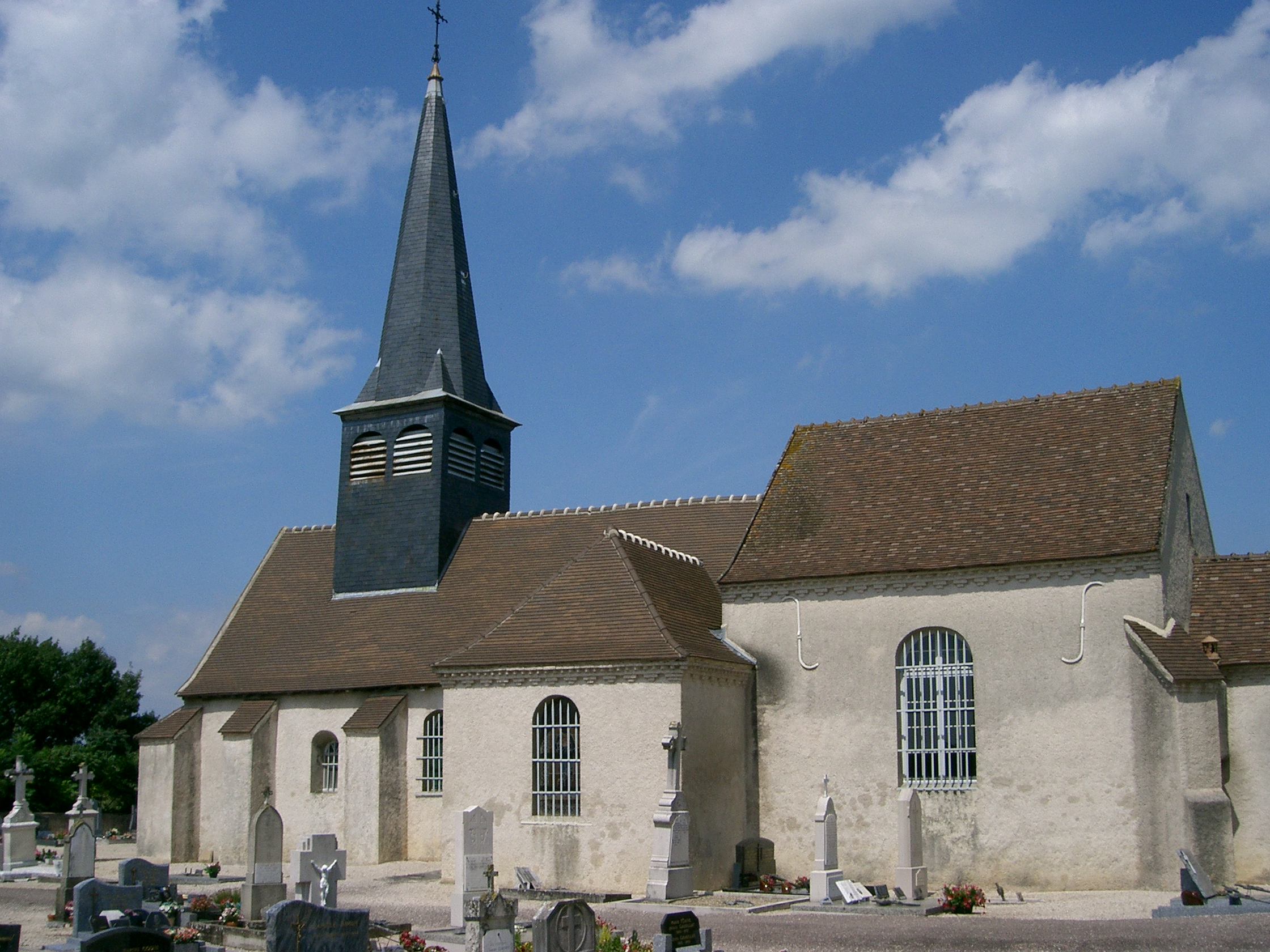
- The church in Saunières
- Location of Saunières
- Location within France Location within Bourgogne-Franche-Comté
- Coordinates: 46°54′09″N 5°04′50″E
- Country: France
- Region: Bourgogne-Franche-Comté
- Department: Saône-et-Loire
- Arrondissement: Chalon-sur-Saône
- Canton: Gergy

Government
  - Mayor (2020–2026): Christine Lequin
- Area^{1}: 7.4 km^{2} (2.9 sq mi)
- Elevation: 192 m (630 ft)
- Highest elevation: 180 m (590 ft)
- Lowest elevation: 173 m (568 ft)
- Population (2023): 81
  - Density: 11/km^{2} (28/sq mi)
- Time zone: UTC+01:00 (CET)
  - Summer (DST): UTC+02:00 (CEST)
- INSEE/Postal code: 71504 /71350
- ^{1} French Land Register data, which excludes lakes, ponds, glaciers > 1 km^{2} (0.386 sq mi or 247 acres) and river estuaries.

Saunières (French pronunciation: [sonjɛʁ]) is a commune in the Saône-et-Loire department in the region of Bourgogne-Franche-Comté in eastern France.

== See also ==
- Communes of the Saône-et-Loire department
