= Navilly =

- Commune
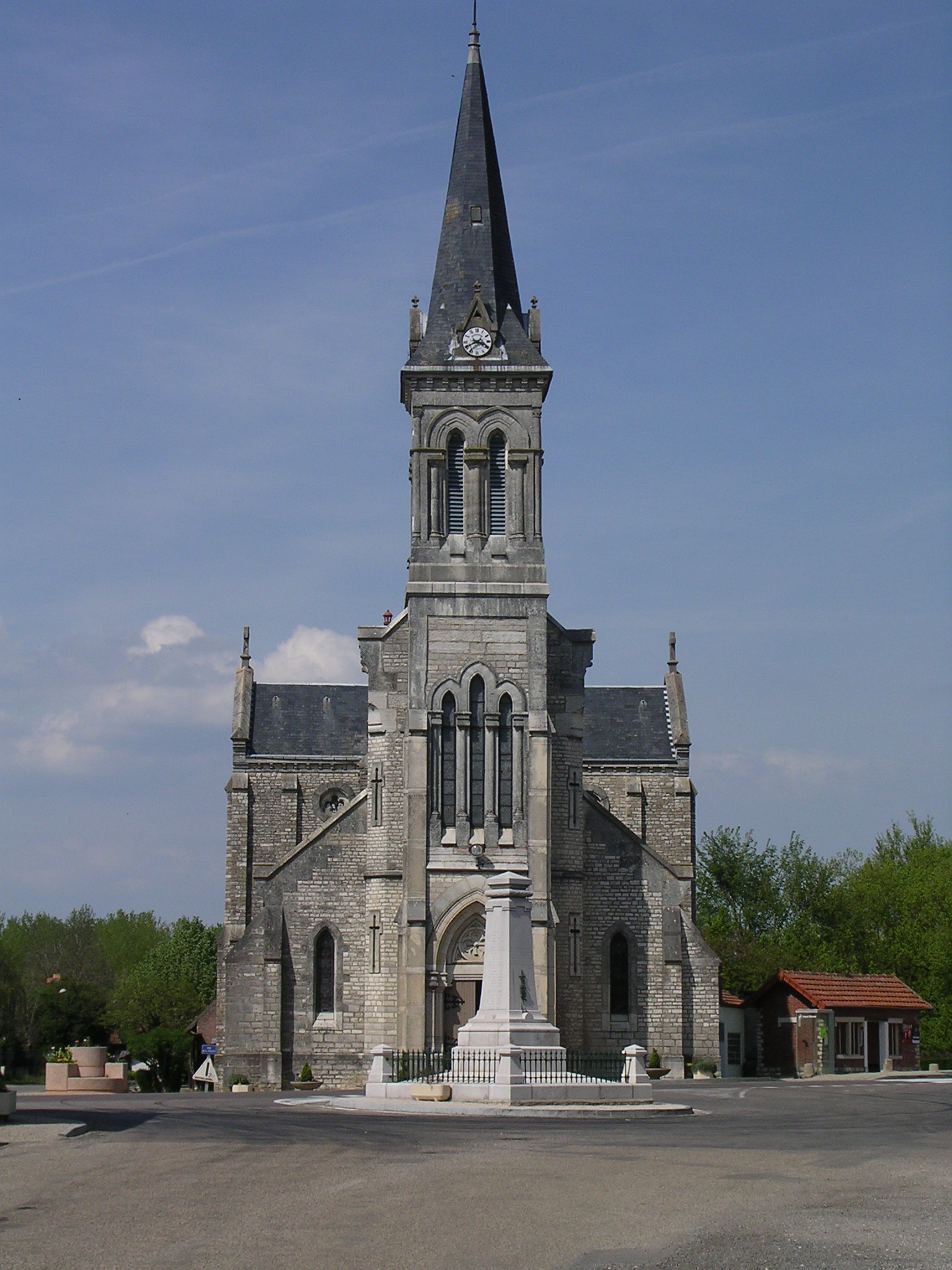
- The church in Navilly
- Location of Navilly
- Location within France Location within Bourgogne-Franche-Comté
- Coordinates: 46°56′12″N 5°08′45″E
- Country: France
- Region: Bourgogne-Franche-Comté
- Department: Saône-et-Loire
- Arrondissement: Chalon-sur-Saône
- Canton: Gergy

Government
  - Mayor (2020–2026): Jean-Louis Fleury
- Area^{1}: 9.68 km^{2} (3.74 sq mi)
- Elevation: 180 m (590 ft)
- Highest elevation: 194 m (636 ft)
- Lowest elevation: 173 m (568 ft)
- Population (2023): 424
  - Density: 43.8/km^{2} (113/sq mi)
- Time zone: UTC+01:00 (CET)
  - Summer (DST): UTC+02:00 (CEST)
- INSEE/Postal code: 71329 /71270
- ^{1} French Land Register data, which excludes lakes, ponds, glaciers > 1 km^{2} (0.386 sq mi or 247 acres) and river estuaries.

Navilly (French pronunciation: [navili]) is a commune in the Saône-et-Loire department in the region of Bourgogne-Franche-Comté in eastern France. It is located in the eastern part of the department, near the Doubs River, and is part of the arrondissement of Chalon-sur-Saône.

== See also ==
- Communes of the Saône-et-Loire department
