= Saint-Loup-Géanges =

- Commune
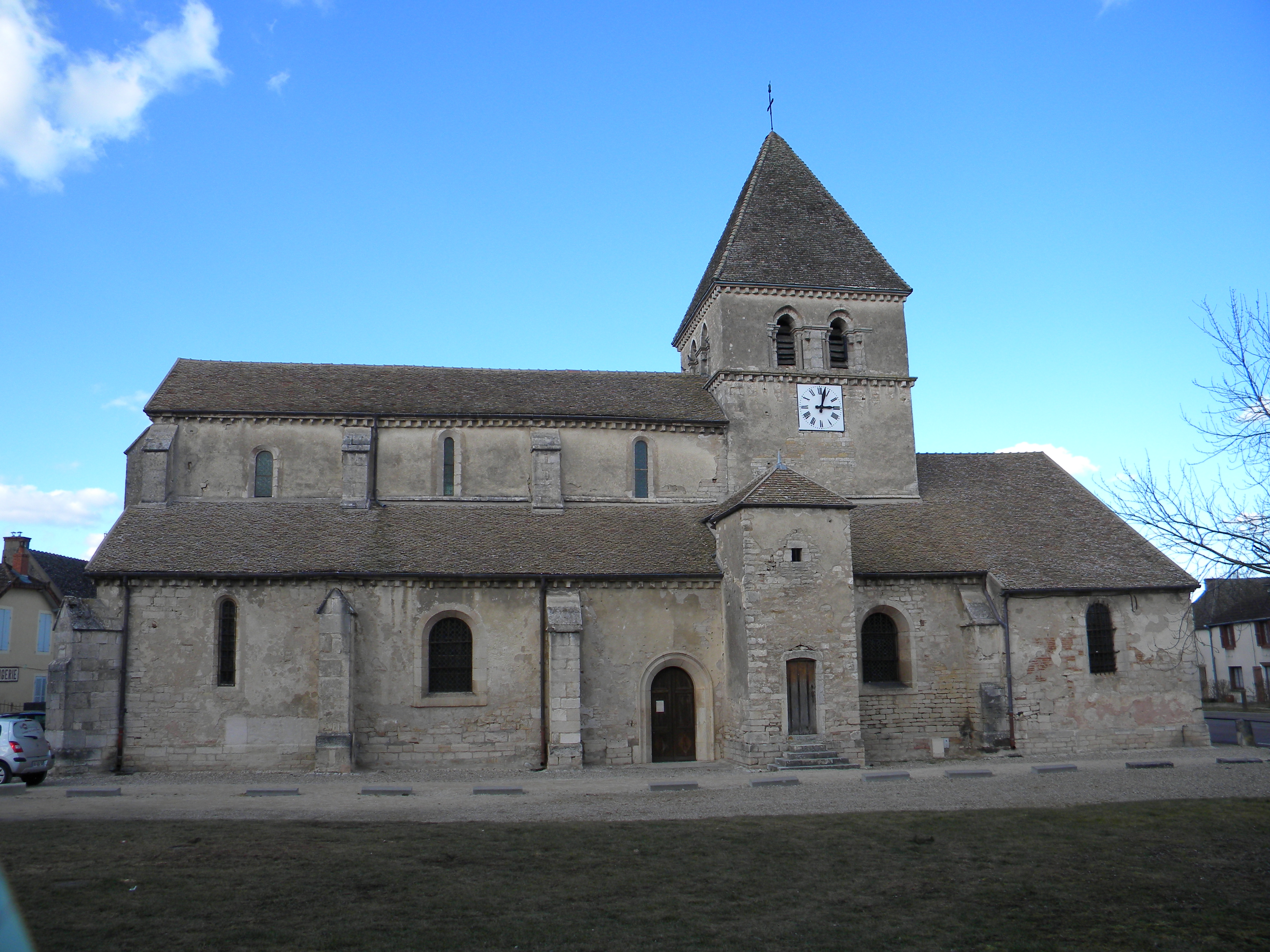
- The church in Saint-Loup-Géanges

- Coat of arms
- Location of Saint-Loup-Géanges
- Location within France Location within Bourgogne-Franche-Comté
- Coordinates: 46°56′51″N 4°54′32″E
- Country: France
- Region: Bourgogne-Franche-Comté
- Department: Saône-et-Loire
- Arrondissement: Chalon-sur-Saône
- Canton: Gergy
- Intercommunality: CA Le Grand Chalon
- Area^{1}: 25.72 km^{2} (9.93 sq mi)
- Population (2023): 1,633
  - Density: 63.49/km^{2} (164.4/sq mi)
- Time zone: UTC+01:00 (CET)
  - Summer (DST): UTC+02:00 (CEST)
- INSEE/Postal code: 71443 /71350
- ^{1} French Land Register data, which excludes lakes, ponds, glaciers > 1 km^{2} (0.386 sq mi or 247 acres) and river estuaries.

Saint-Loup-Géanges (French pronunciation: [sɛ̃ lu ʒeɑ̃ʒ]) is a commune in the Saône-et-Loire department in the region of Bourgogne-Franche-Comté in eastern France.

Formerly known as Saint-Loup-de-la-Salle, the village was merged with the village of Géanges of January 1, 1973 and its name was changed to Saint-Loup-Géanges.

== See also ==
- Communes of the Saône-et-Loire department
