= Lessard-le-National =

- Commune
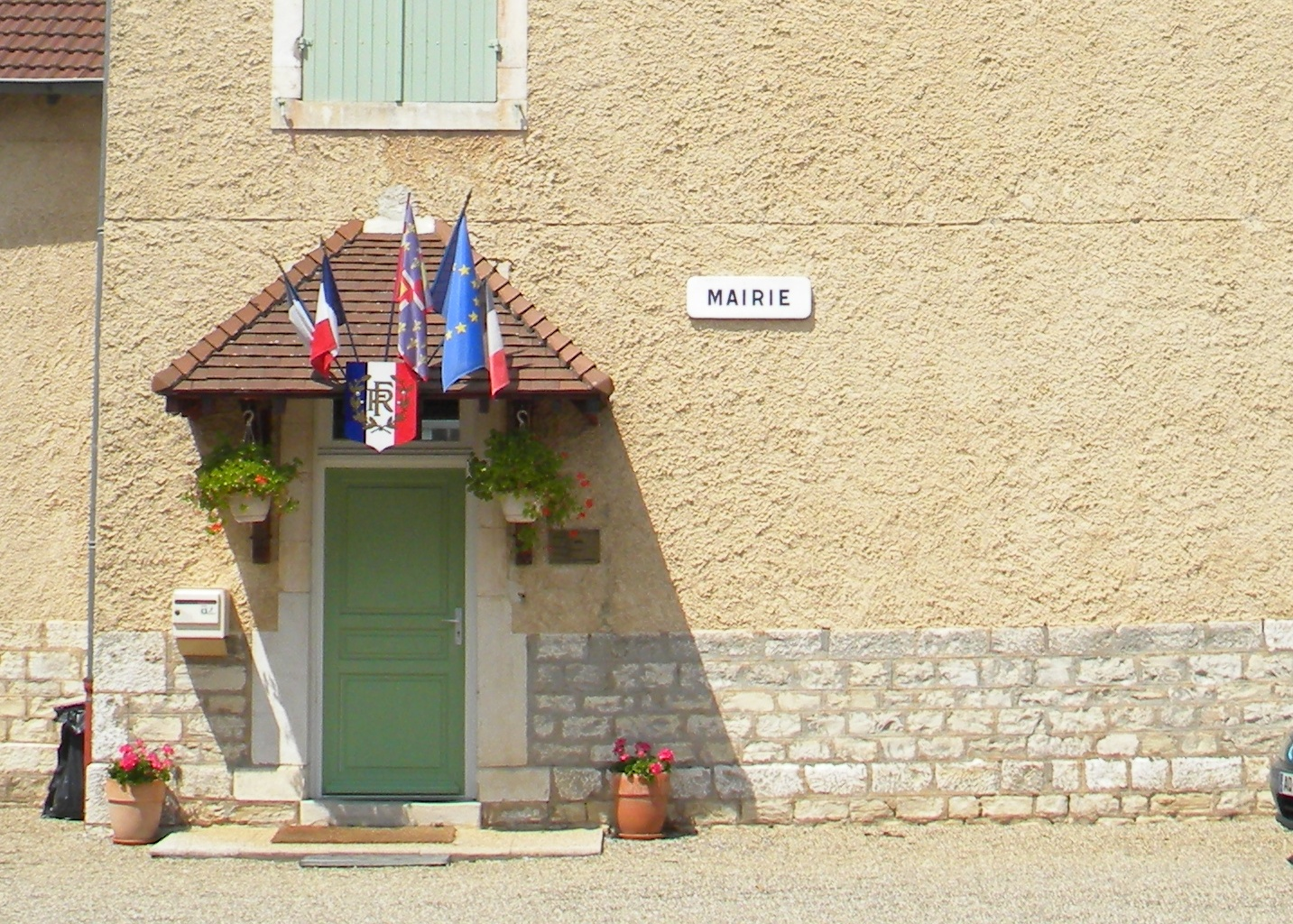
- Town hall

- Coat of arms
- Location of Lessard-le-National
- Location within France Location within Bourgogne-Franche-Comté
- Coordinates: 46°51′58″N 4°50′14″E
- Country: France
- Region: Bourgogne-Franche-Comté
- Department: Saône-et-Loire
- Arrondissement: Chalon-sur-Saône
- Canton: Gergy
- Intercommunality: CA Le Grand Chalon
- Area^{1}: 10.56 km^{2} (4.08 sq mi)
- Elevation: 200 m (660 ft)
- Highest elevation: 229 m (751 ft)
- Lowest elevation: 185 m (607 ft)
- Population (2023): 662
  - Density: 62.7/km^{2} (162/sq mi)
- Time zone: UTC+01:00 (CET)
  - Summer (DST): UTC+02:00 (CEST)
- INSEE/Postal code: 71257 /71530
- ^{1} French Land Register data, which excludes lakes, ponds, glaciers > 1 km^{2} (0.386 sq mi or 247 acres) and river estuaries.

Lessard-le-National (French pronunciation: [lɛsaʁ lə nɑsjɔnal]) is a commune in the Saône-et-Loire department in the region of Bourgogne-Franche-Comté in eastern France.

== See also ==
- Communes of the Saône-et-Loire department
