= Allerey-sur-Saône =

- Commune
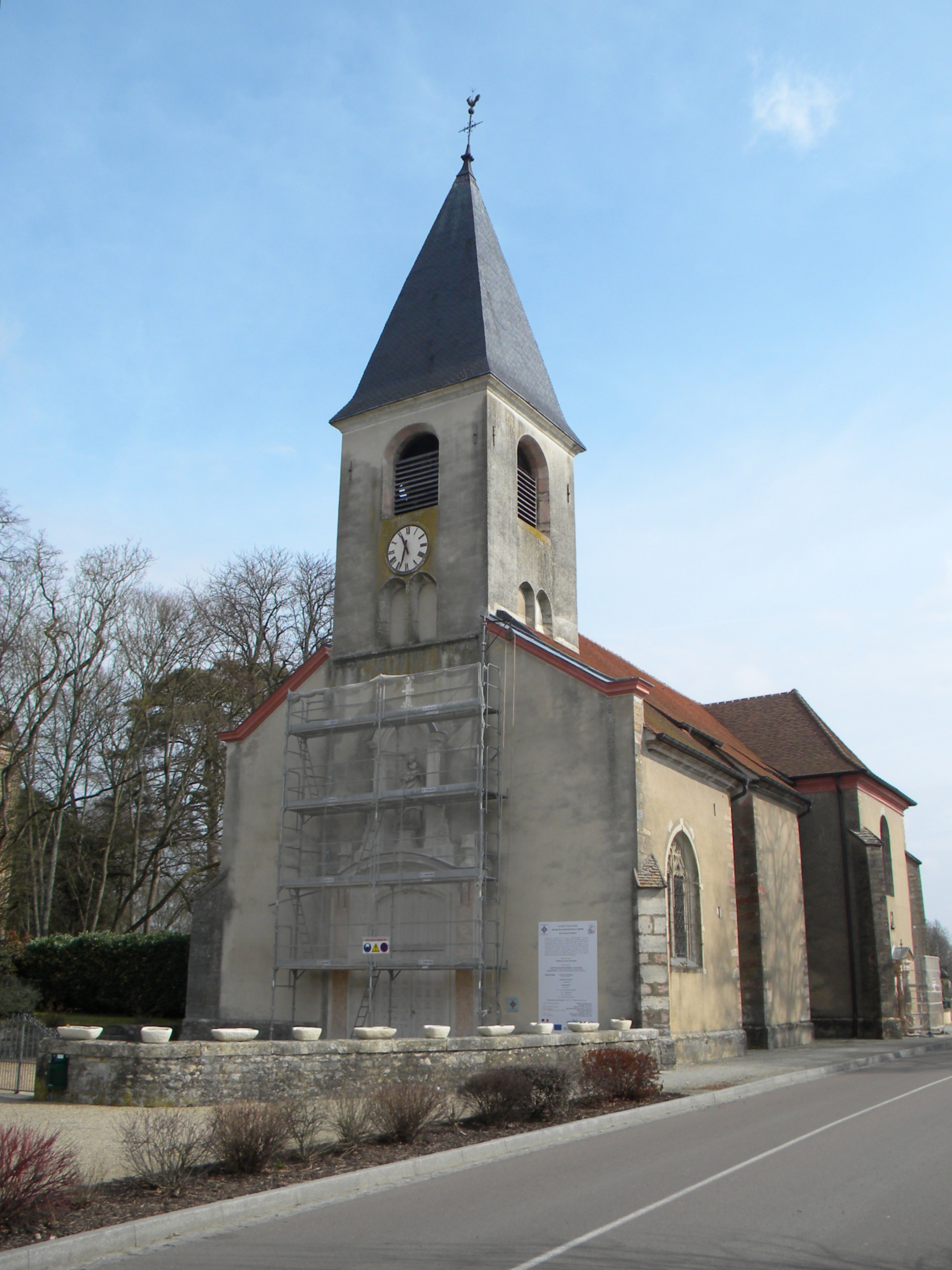

- Coat of arms
- Location of Allerey-sur-Saône
- Location within France Location within Bourgogne-Franche-Comté
- Coordinates: 46°54′23″N 4°59′00″E
- Country: France
- Region: Bourgogne-Franche-Comté
- Department: Saône-et-Loire
- Arrondissement: Chalon-sur-Saône
- Canton: Gergy
- Intercommunality: CA Le Grand Chalon

Government
  - Mayor (2020–2026): Pierre Rageot
- Area^{1}: 16.42 km^{2} (6.34 sq mi)
- Elevation: 190 m (620 ft)
- Highest elevation: 205 m (673 ft)
- Lowest elevation: 172 m (564 ft)
- Population (2023): 804
  - Density: 49.0/km^{2} (127/sq mi)
- Time zone: UTC+01:00 (CET)
  - Summer (DST): UTC+02:00 (CEST)
- INSEE/Postal code: 71003 /71350
- ^{1} French Land Register data, which excludes lakes, ponds, glaciers > 1 km^{2} (0.386 sq mi or 247 acres) and river estuaries.

Allerey-sur-Saône (French pronunciation: [alʁɛ syʁ son], literally Allerey on Saône) is a commune in the Saône-et-Loire department in the Bourgogne-Franche-Comté region in eastern France.

== Castle of Allerey ==
The castle of Allerey sits in the east of the main town of Allerey, in the center of its private gardens.

=== History ===
The castle has existed since the 13th century at least.

Lords of the castle include Hugues de Mailly in the 14th century, and Jean de Lugny in the 15th century.

In 1636, the castle was burned down by Croatian soldiers, but later, in the 18th century, was reconstructed by Pierre Espiard-Humbert d'Allerey.

== Population ==
Historical population
Year	Pop.	±% p.a.
1968	533	—
1975	504	−0.80%
1982	550	+1.26%
1990	592	+0.92%
1999	616	+0.44%
2007	752	+2.52%
2012	803	+1.32%
2017	802	−0.02%
2023	804	+0.04%
Source: INSEE

== See also ==
- Communes of the Saône-et-Loire department
