= Écuelles, Saône-et-Loire =

Écuelles
- Commune
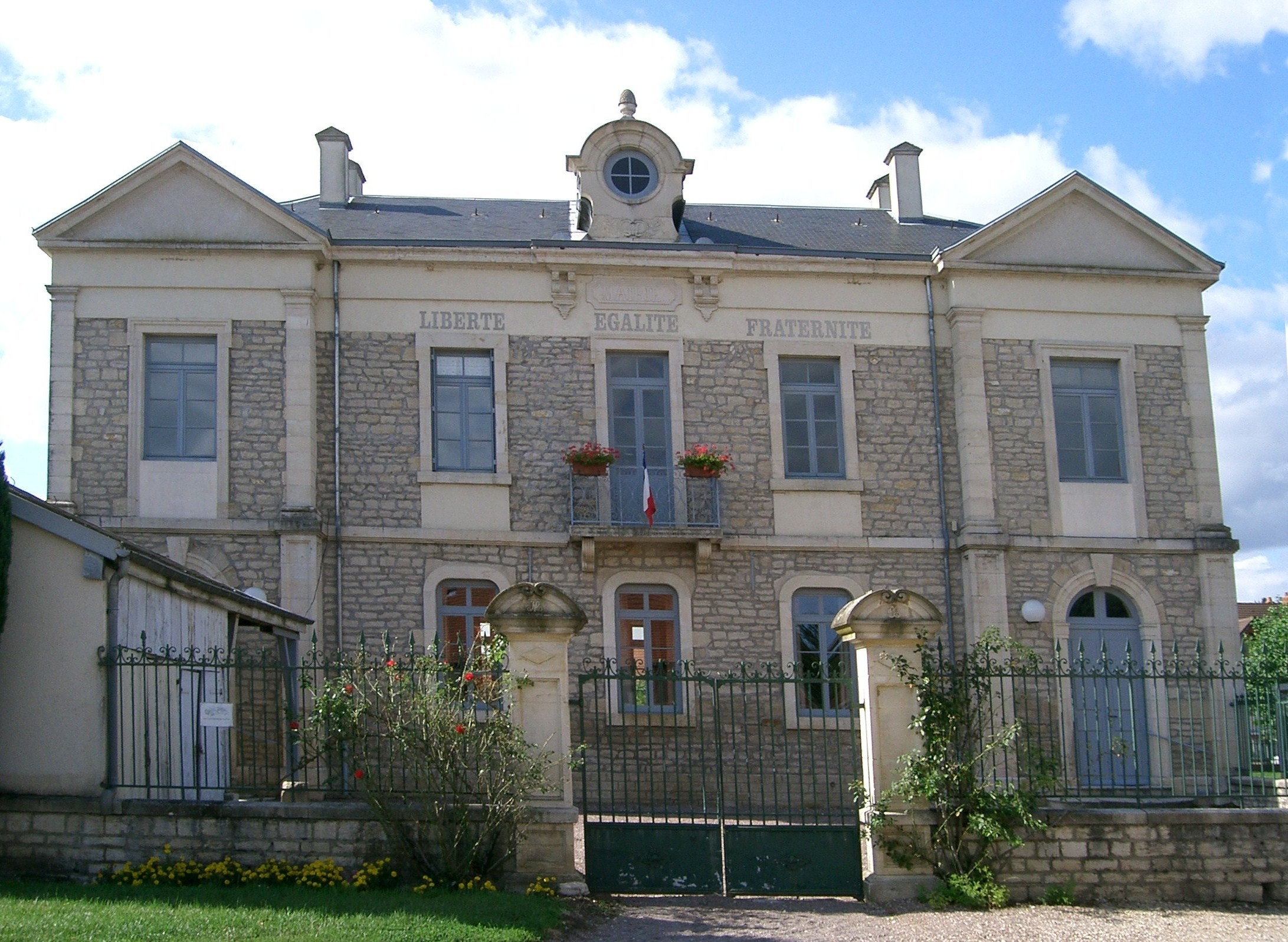
- Town hall
- Location of Écuelles
- Location within France Location within Bourgogne-Franche-Comté
- Coordinates: 46°56′42″N 5°03′40″E
- Country: France
- Region: Bourgogne-Franche-Comté
- Department: Saône-et-Loire
- Arrondissement: Chalon-sur-Saône
- Canton: Gergy
- Area^{1}: 9.93 km^{2} (3.83 sq mi)
- Elevation: 189 m (620 ft)
- Highest elevation: 205 m (673 ft)
- Lowest elevation: 173 m (568 ft)
- Population (2023): 252
  - Density: 25.4/km^{2} (65.7/sq mi)
- Time zone: UTC+01:00 (CET)
  - Summer (DST): UTC+02:00 (CEST)
- INSEE/Postal code: 71186 /71350
- ^{1} French Land Register data, which excludes lakes, ponds, glaciers > 1 km^{2} (0.386 sq mi or 247 acres) and river estuaries.

Écuelles (French pronunciation: [ekɥɛl]) is a commune in the Saône-et-Loire department in the region of Bourgogne-Franche-Comté in eastern France.

== See also ==
- Communes of the Saône-et-Loire department
