= Saint-Gervais-en-Vallière =

- Commune
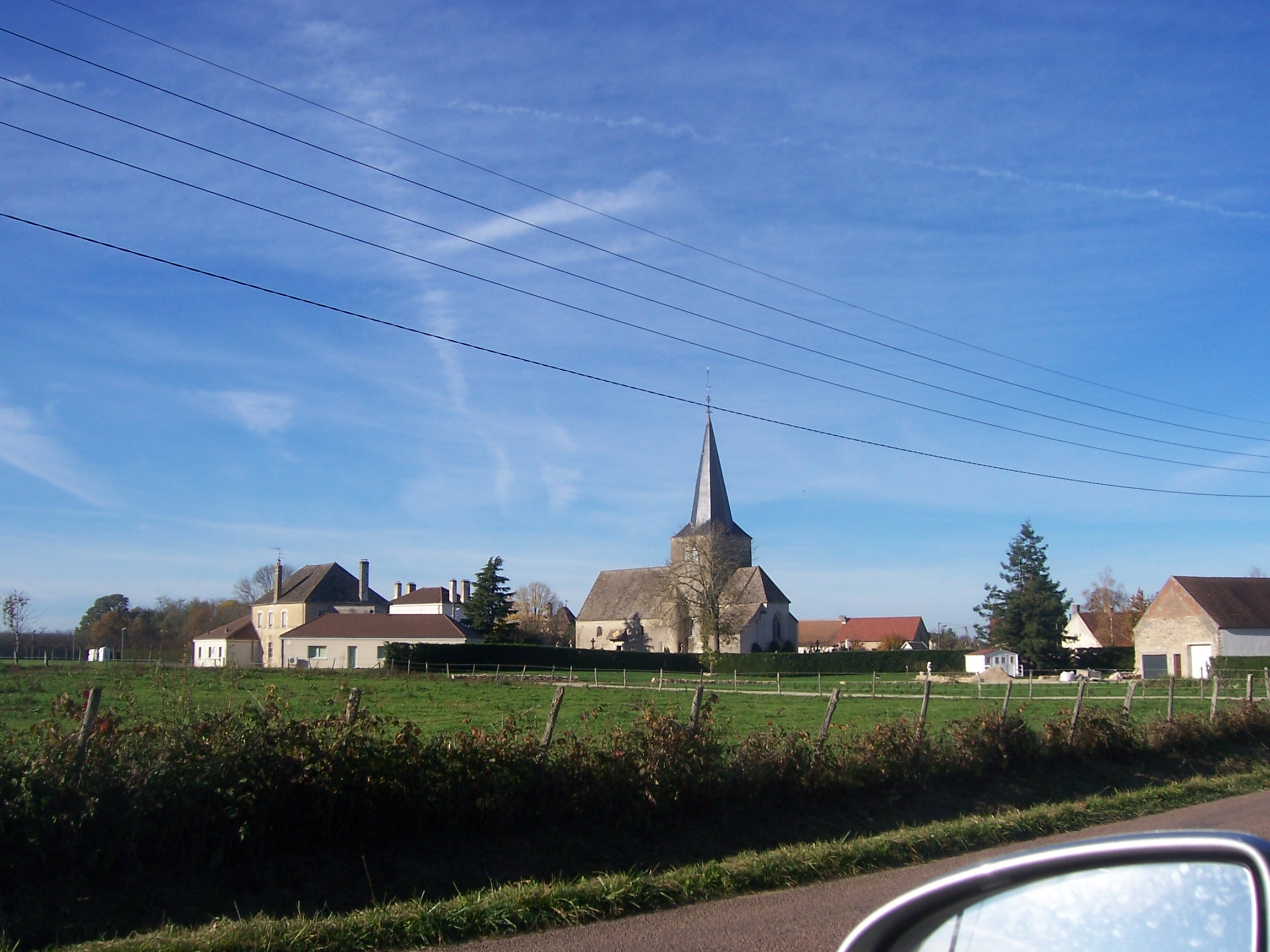
- A general view of Saint-Gervais-en-Vallière
- Location of Saint-Gervais-en-Vallière
- Location within France Location within Bourgogne-Franche-Comté
- Coordinates: 46°56′27″N 4°57′07″E
- Country: France
- Region: Bourgogne-Franche-Comté
- Department: Saône-et-Loire
- Arrondissement: Chalon-sur-Saône
- Canton: Gergy

Government
  - Mayor (2023–2026): Yann Bautheney
- Area^{1}: 16.27 km^{2} (6.28 sq mi)
- Elevation: 205 m (673 ft)
- Highest elevation: 206 m (676 ft)
- Lowest elevation: 178 m (584 ft)
- Population (2023): 445
  - Density: 27.4/km^{2} (70.8/sq mi)
- Time zone: UTC+01:00 (CET)
  - Summer (DST): UTC+02:00 (CEST)
- INSEE/Postal code: 71423 /71350
- ^{1} French Land Register data, which excludes lakes, ponds, glaciers > 1 km^{2} (0.386 sq mi or 247 acres) and river estuaries.

Saint-Gervais-en-Vallière is a commune in the Saône-et-Loire department in the region of Bourgogne-Franche-Comté in eastern France.

As of 2015, its population was 438.

== See also ==
- Communes of the Saône-et-Loire department
