= Montagny =

Montagny may refer to:

In France:

- Montagny, Loire
- Montagny, Rhône
- Montagny, Savoie
- Montagny AOC, a wine appellation in the Côte Chalonnaise subregion of Burgundy.

In Switzerland:

- Montagny, Fribourg, consisting of
  - Montagny-les-Monts
  - Montagny-la-Ville
- Montagny-près-Yverdon, Vaud

== See also ==
- Montagny-en-Vexin
- Montagny-lès-Beaune
- Montagny-lès-Buxy
- Montagny-les-Lanches
- Montagny-lès-Seurre
- Montagny-près-Louhans
- Montagny-près-Yverdon
- Montagny-Sainte-Félicité
- Montagny-sur-Grosne

== People ==
- Franck Montagny, motor racing driver
