= Montagny wine =

Wine region

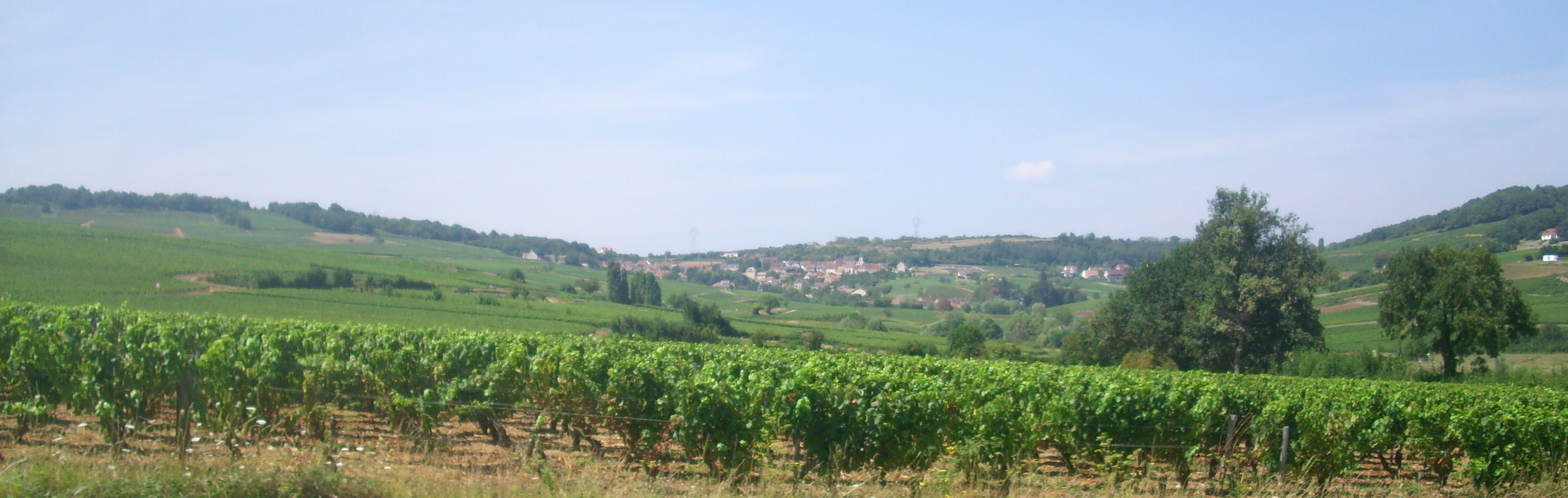
Vineyards around Montagny-lès-Buxy

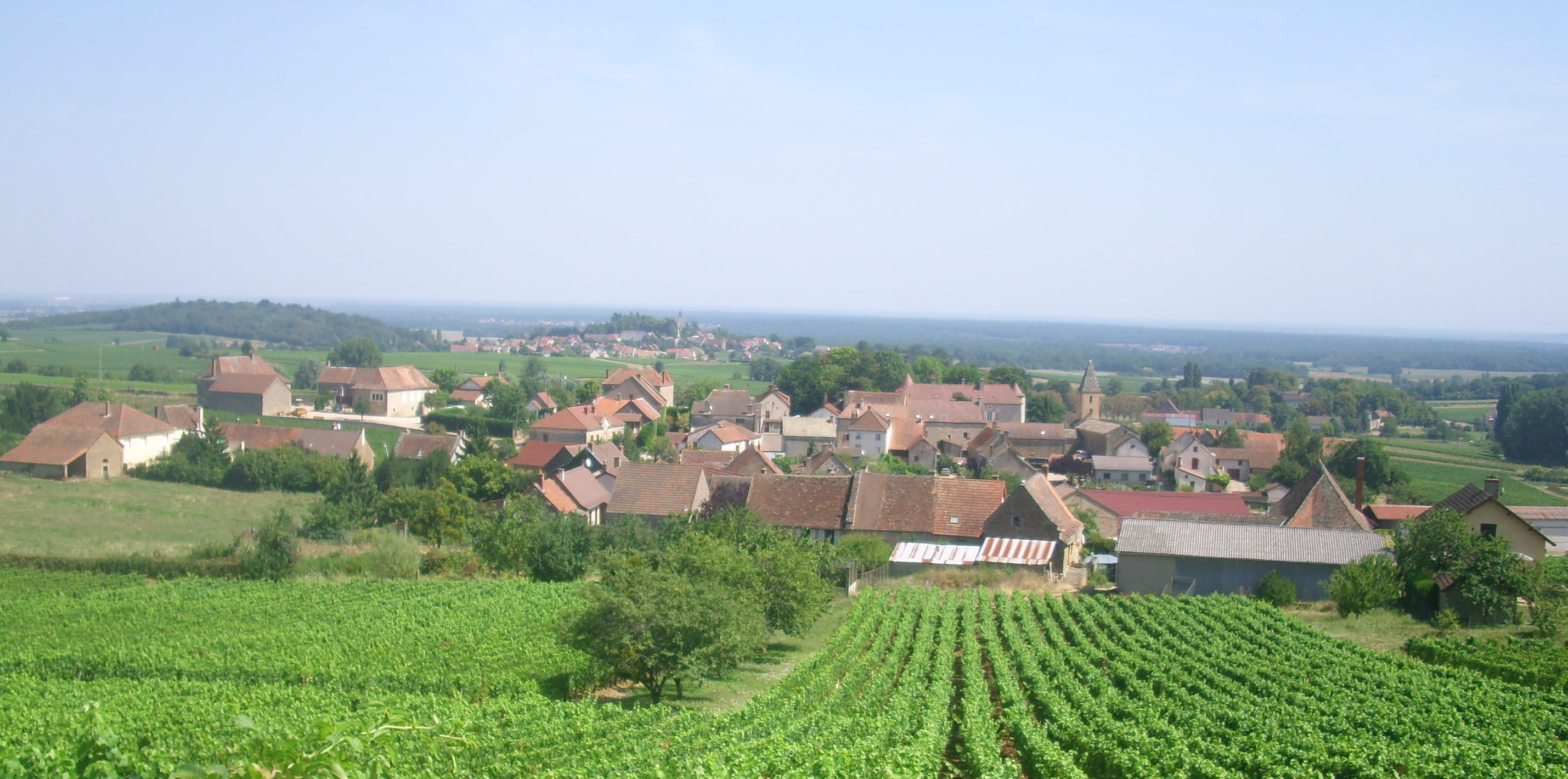
Vineyards around Saint-Vallerin

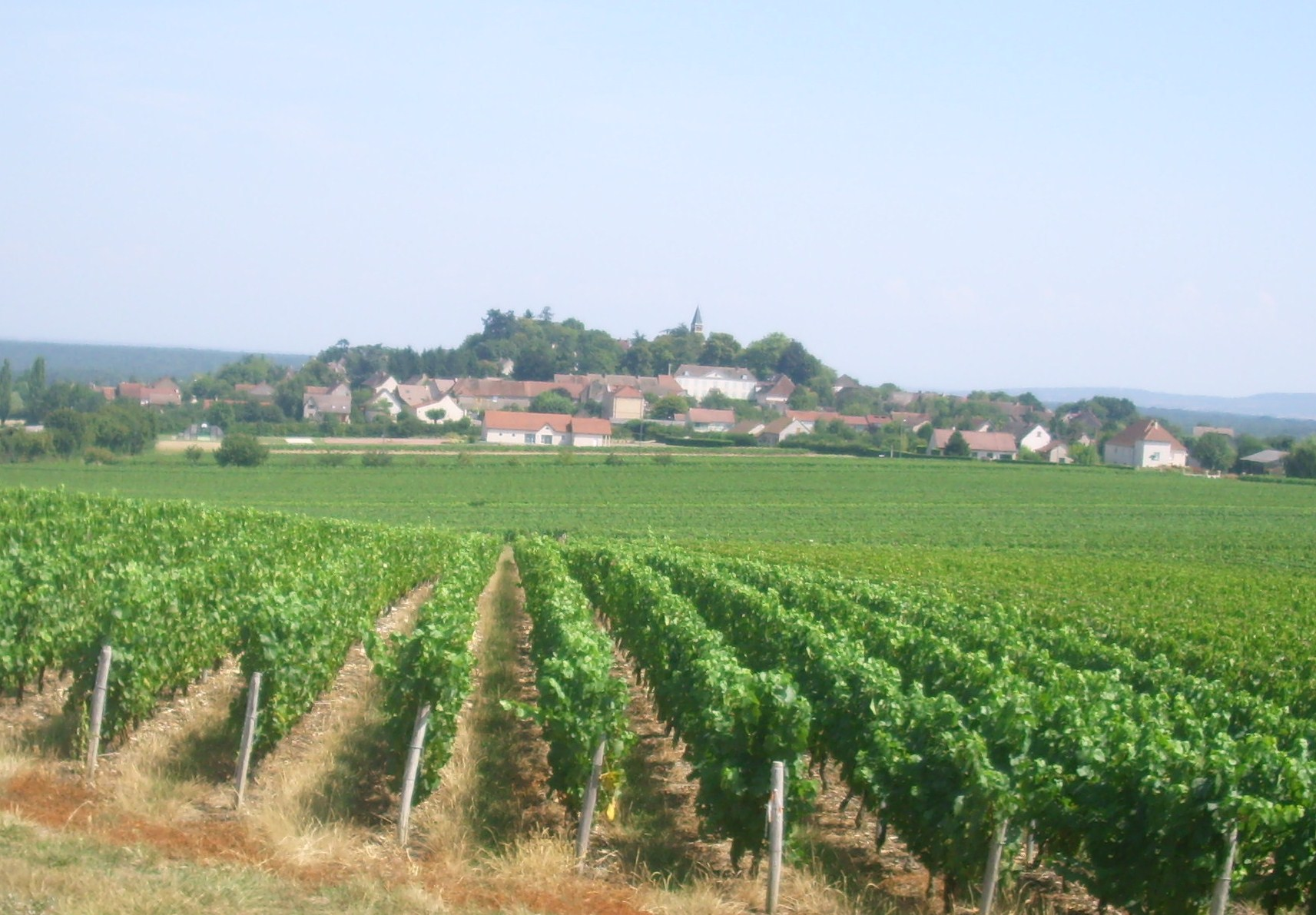
Vineyards around Jully-lès-Buxy

Montagny wine is produced in the communes of Montagny-lès-Buxy, Buxy, Saint-Vallerin and Jully-lès-Buxy in the Côte Chalonnaise subregion of Burgundy. The Appellation d'origine contrôlée (AOC) Montagny may be used for white wine with Chardonnay as the main grape variety. There are 49 Premier Cru vineyards within Montagny AOC, but no Grand Cru vineyards exist in this part of Burgundy. The AOC was created in 1936.

== Production ==
In 2008, 310.73 hectares (767.8 acres) of vineyard surface was in production for Montagny at village and Premier Cru level, and 17,015 hectoliter of wine was produced, which corresponds to close to 2.3 million bottles.

== Premiers Crus ==
There are 49 climats within the Montagny AOC classified as Premier Cru vineyards. Their wines are designated Montagny Premier Cru + vineyard name, or as just Montagny Premier Cru, in which case it is possible to blend wine from several Premier Cru vineyards within the AOC.

In 2008, 200.80 hectares (496.2 acres) of the total Givry vineyard surface consisted of Premier Cru vineyards. The annual production of Premier Cru wine, as a five-year average, is 12,078 hectoliter.

The following Premier Cru vineyards are located in the commune of Montagny-lès-Buxy:

- Vignes Saint-Pierre
- Les Combes
- Saint-Ytages
- Les Charmelottes
- Champ Toizeau
- Vignes sur le Cloux
- Les Garchères
- Vignes Couland
- Les Bouchots
- Les Burnins
- Les Perrières
- Les Treuffères
- Montcuchot
- Vigne du Soleil
- Les Maroques
- Les Beaux Champs
- Les Macles
- Creux de Beaux Champs
- L’Épaule
- Les Platières
- Les Jardins
- Saint-Morille
- Les Vignes Derrière
- Les Bordes
- Les Las
- Les Gouresses
- Les Paquiers
- Montorge
- Les Resses
- Le Cloux
- Sous les Feilles

The following Premier Cru vineyards are located in the commune of Buxy:

- La Grande Pièce
- Le Clos Chaudron
- Les Vignes des Prés
- Le Vieux Château
- La Condemine du Vieux Château
- Le Clouzot
- Les Pidances
- Les Coudrettes
- Les Vignes Longues
- Cornevent
- Mont Laurent
- Les Bonneveaux
- Les Bassets

The following Premier Cru vineyards are located in the commune of Saint-Vallerin:

- Les Craboulettes
- Les Coères
- La Moullière

The following Premier Cru vineyards are located in the commune of Jully-lès-Buxy:

- Les Chaniots
- Chazelle
