= Claude Grange =

French sculptor

- Born: 23 September 1883; Vienne in Isère, France
- Died: 22 September 1971 (aged 87); Paris, France
- Occupation: Sculptor

Claude Grange (born 23 September 1883 in Vienne – died 22 September 1971 in Paris) was a French sculptor.

== Biography ==
Claude Grange was a sculptor, born in Vienne in Isère on 23 September 1883 and who died in Paris on 22 September 1971. He attended Ponsard college in Vienne, then attended Lyon's École des Beaux-Arts before moving on to Paris' École des Beaux-Arts in 1906. There he won the "Prix de Rome" in 1913 and enrolled at the Villa Médicis. Grange was called up in 1914 and joined the 5th Colonial Infantry. By the time he left the army in 1919 he was a captain in the marines, had been awarded the Croix de Guerre with palm and the rosette of the Légion d'honneur

After the end of the 1914-1918 war there was a huge demand in France for war memorials and Grange received several commissions for work on such monuments. He executed sculpture for the Vienne war memorial in 1926, that for Verdun in 1928 and the Monument aux Basques at Craonnelle. He also executed bas-reliefs for the "île des Cygnes" in the Parc de la Tête d'Or in Lyon, a bust of Hector Berlioz and Victor Charles Descoust and the head of Mademoiselle Suzanne Ursault. He also created a bas-relief portrait for the tomb of Léon Cathlin in Chalezeule's cemetery. In 1960 he executed a bas-relief for the "Memorial de la France combattante" at Mont Valérien.

In 1926 he was awarded a gold medal for his composition "L’Automne", 1933 saw the unveiling of his Berlioz statue, followed in 1934 by "Hommage à Chopin". In 1935, the composition "Saint-Colomban" won him a medal of honour. He served in the army again in the 1939–1940, war being stationed in Syria. 1950 saw him made a member of the Académie des Beaux Arts and three years later he became its president. In 1969 he received the "Grand Prix de la Société des Artistes Français". He died on 22 September 1971 and is buried in Père-Lachaise cemetery in Paris.

== Principal works ==
=== "Électre veillant sur le sommeil d’Oreste" ===
Every year the Ếcole Nationale Supérieure des Beaux-Arts organized a competition for the Prix de Rome and set a subject for the students to work on. "Électre veillant sur le sommeil d’Oreste" was the subject for the 1911 competition and Grange was the runner up. The prize was won by Lucienne Heuvelmans. Grange's submission is held by the Musée de Vienne.

=== "Berger chaldéen étudiant les astros" ===
Grange was awarded second prize in the Prix de Rome of 1912 for this work.

=== "Concours de chant entre bergers" ===
This was Grange's submission which won him the Prix de Rome in 1913. This entitled him to study in Rome at the villa Médicis.

=== "Le Soir" ===
In 1914, Grange was awarded the bronze medal of the Société des Artistes Français for this composition.

=== Statue of Saint Columba ===
Grange's sculpture of the Irish monk and missionary stands in front of the Saint-Pierre Basilica in Luxeuil-les-Bains.

=== Portrait of a young woman ===
Bust executed in 1924 and held in Poitiers' musée Sainte-Croix.

=== Bust of Victor Charles Descoust ===
This bronze bust dates to 1922 and is located in Poitiers's musée Sainte-Croix.

=== The monument to Hector Berlioz in Grenoble ===
The original 1903 Berlioz bronze had been requisitioned by the Germans and melted down for re-use of the metal and the replacement was erected in 1953 on the same spot in the Place Victor Hugo. Grange had presented a plaster copy to the 1933 salon and this is held by the Musée Hector-Berlioz in La Côte-Saint-André.

=== Bust of Hector Berlioz ===
This bust can be seen in the Museum of Grenoble.

=== Works in the Vienne cimetière de Pipet ===
Grange carried out the following:-

1. A bronze medallion on the grave of Jules Buisson the composer.

2. A medallion on the grave of the painter Henry Jacquier.

3. A bronze bust on the grave of Tony Zacharie the painter and member of the "École de Vienne".

== War memorials ==
=== Mémorial de la France combattante ===
Grange executed one of the many reliefs for the Mémorial de la France combattante. His relief, named "FAFL", commemorates the forces of the Free French Airforce.

=== War memorial in Lyon's Parc de la Tête-d'Or (War memorial on Île du Souvenir) ===
This memorial is to be found in a public park in the place du Général-Leclerc. The park was created in 1856 by the Swiss landscape gardeners Denis and Eugène Bühler and the war memorial was designed by Tony Garnier. The memorial comprises a haunting sculpture by Jean Larrivé depicting several figures carrying a shrouded coffin with, on either side, bas-reliefs by Louis Bertola and Grange. The memorial, which stands on the île du Souvenir was constructed between 1924 and 1930. Grange's relief featured a horse and a female allegory of victory.

=== Sainte-Colombe, Rhône War Memorial ===
This limestone memorial was erected in 1922.

=== Lunéville War Memorial ===
Extended to cover the dead of all conflicts in which France was involved since 1914, the memorial now carries more than 1,400 names. The memorial stands in the gardens of the Château de Commercy.

Vienne war memorial inaugurated in 1923 by Philippe Petain, classified as a historical monument in 2019

=== Vienne War Memorial ===
For this memorial Grange sculpted a female allegory for France standing with outstretched arms. On the memorial's base he added bas-reliefs depicting soldiers and scenes from the war.

=== Verdun War Memorial ===
Inaugurated on 1 November 1928, the monument depicts a line of five soldiers representing the different sections of the armed forces. From left to right we have a cavalryman with his sabre, a territorial ready for any work thrown at him even helping maintain the "Voie sacrée". In the centre is a young infantryman, determined and with fists clenched he is the hero of the battlefields and the victor at Verdun. Then we have the old colonial soldier with his distinct moustache and finally an artilleryman.

A sign next to the monument gives the following information

"ce monument oeuvre de Forest, Architecte, et de Grange, Sculpteur, Symbolise la célèbre devise de Verdun 1916 on ne passe pas cinq soldats de différentes armes au coude à coude, forment un mur contre lequel est venu se briser l'assaut de l'ennemi. Ce monument a été erigé à la mémoire des Enfants de Verdun morts pour la France"

Now the monument bears not only the names of the 518 casualties of the Great War but both military and civilian victims of the Second World War, including deportees and resistance fighters and those who lost their lives in Algeria and overseas.

=== Saint-Jean-de-Bournay War Memorial ===
The inauguration of this memorial took place on 11 November 1923.

=== The Monument des Basques ===
The monument, designed by the architect Mathieu Forest, is located in Craonnelle and is also known as the Memorial to the French 36th Infantry Division. It was erected in 1928. The 36th Infantry Division, notably the Infantry Regiment of Pau, the 34th Infantry Regiment of Mont-de-Marsan and the 14th Artillery Regiment of Tarbes, was composed mostly of recruits from the southwest region of France: Hautes-Pyrénées, Landes and Basses-Pyrénées and it fought on the Chemin des Dames during the 1914-1918 war and sustained substantial losses notably in fighting at the Hurtebise farm area and at Craonne. The monument comprises a 14-metre-high (46 ft) obelisk made from stone from Souppes near Melun, the stone used for the Arc de Triomphe and the basilica of Sacre-Coeur at Montmartre and at the base of the obelisk is a Grange sculpture of a soldier in traditional basque costume and wearing a basque beret. He carries a makhila. The soldier has turned his back on the battle area and looks out in the direction of his homeland. The base of the memorial also records the names of the regiments which made up the 36th and, under the carving of a military helmet, the names of the battles in which the 36th fought and the names of the division's principal commanders.

==== Images of Basque Memorial ====
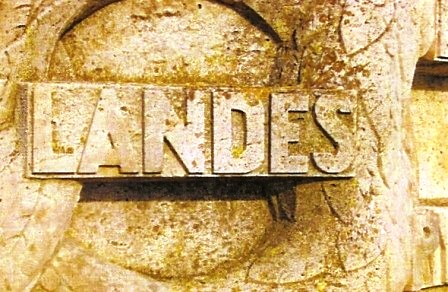
"Landes" mention on Basque Memorial.

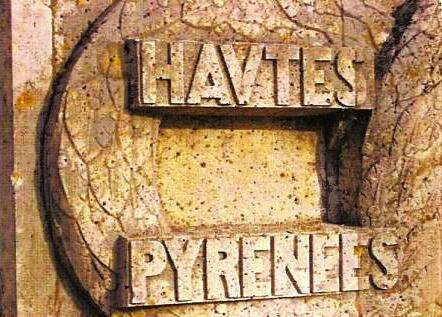
"Hautes Pyrénées" mention on Basque Memorial

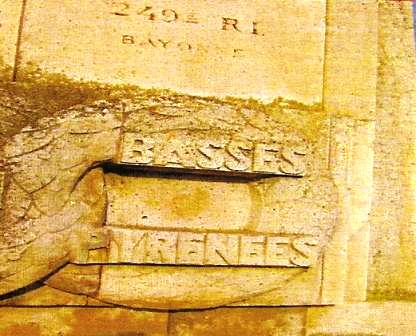
"Basses Pyrénées" mention on Basque Memorial

== See also ==
- War memorial on Île du Souvenir
