= Jully-lès-Buxy =

- Commune
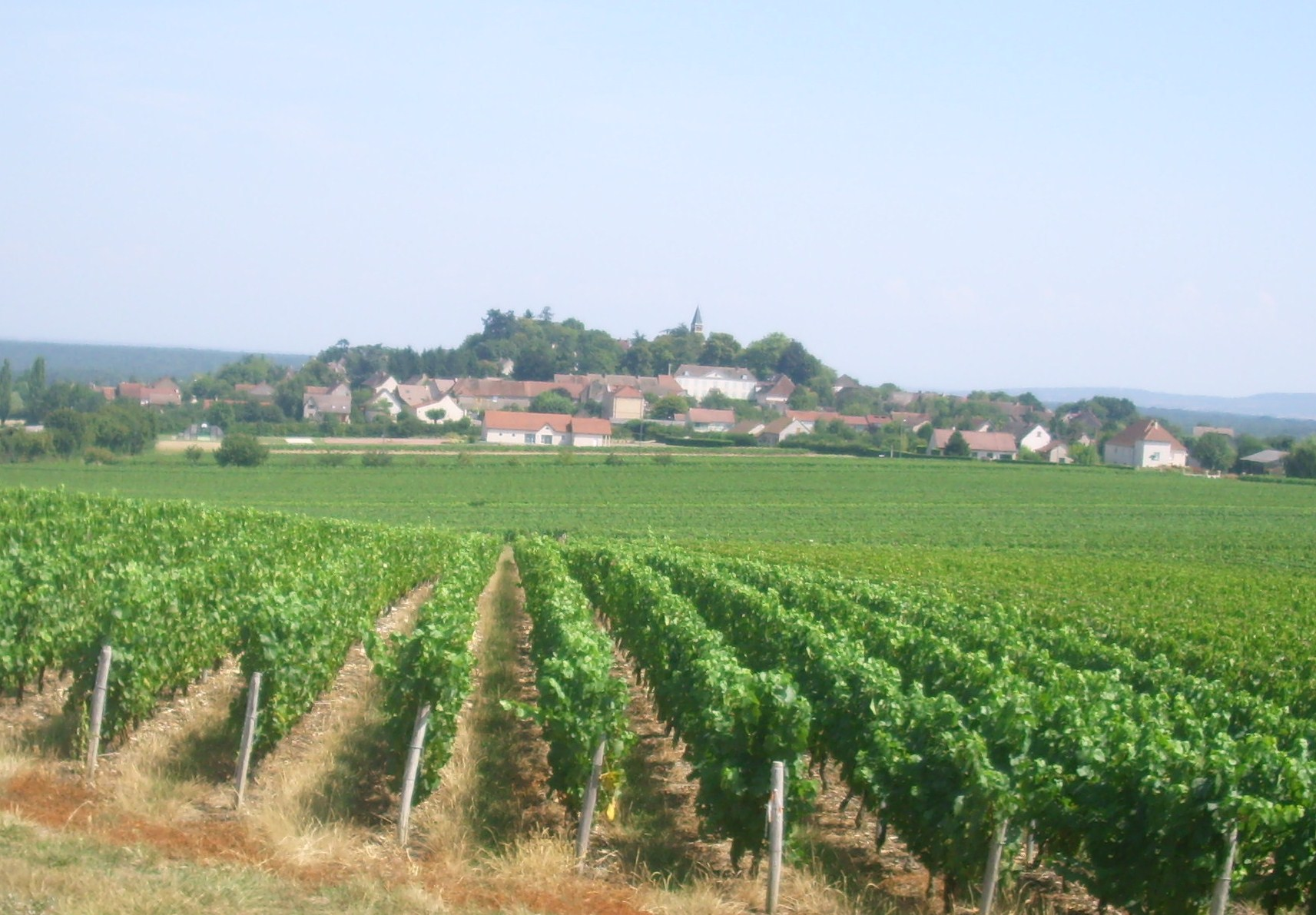
- A general view of Jully-lès-Buxy
- Location of Jully-lès-Buxy
- Location within France Location within Bourgogne-Franche-Comté
- Coordinates: 46°41′28″N 4°41′47″E
- Country: France
- Region: Bourgogne-Franche-Comté
- Department: Saône-et-Loire
- Arrondissement: Chalon-sur-Saône
- Canton: Givry
- Area^{1}: 16.63 km^{2} (6.42 sq mi)
- Elevation: 283 m (928 ft)
- Highest elevation: 310 m (1,020 ft)
- Lowest elevation: 192 m (630 ft)
- Population (2023): 343
  - Density: 20.6/km^{2} (53.4/sq mi)
- Time zone: UTC+01:00 (CET)
  - Summer (DST): UTC+02:00 (CEST)
- INSEE/Postal code: 71247 /71390
- ^{1} French Land Register data, which excludes lakes, ponds, glaciers > 1 km^{2} (0.386 sq mi or 247 acres) and river estuaries.

Jully-lès-Buxy (French pronunciation: [ʒyli lɛ byksi], literally Jully near Buxy) is a commune in the Saône-et-Loire department in the region of Bourgogne-Franche-Comté in eastern France.

== See also ==
- Communes of the Saône-et-Loire department
- Côte Chalonnaise
