= Philippe du Contant de la Molette =

French theologian and scholar (1737–1793)

- Born: 29 August 1737; La Côte-Saint-André, Dauphiné, France
- Died: 1793 (aged 55–56)
- Cause of death: Reign of Terror
- Education: Sorbonne
- Occupations: theologian and biblical scholar

Philippe du Contant de La Molette (29 August 1737 – 1793) was a French theologian and biblical scholar.

== Biography ==
He was born at La Côte-Saint-André, in Dauphiné, France, 29 August 1737. He studied at the Sorbonne, and, in 1765, defended a thesis on Job, in six languages. Louis XV was so well pleased that he allowed him to pass the examinations for the licentiate without the required delays, a privilege, however, which de la Molette did not use. Later on, he became Vicar-General of the diocese of Vienne, France.

He died on the scaffold during the Reign of Terror in 1793.

== Works ==
As a biblical author, he shows great erudition and is well versed in the Semitic languages, but he lacked originality, and his criticism is often misleading. His works, all published in Paris, are the following:

- Essai sur l'Ecriture Sainte, ou Tableau historique des avantages que l'on peut tirer des langues orientales pour la parfaite intelligence des Livres Saints (1775)
- Nouvelle méthode pour entrer dans le vrai sens de l'Ecriture sainte (1777)
- La Genèse expliquée d'après les textes primitifs, etc. (1777), 3 vols., a work intended especially as a refutation of Voltaire
- L'Exode expliqué, 3 vols. (1780); the thesis that he had defended in 1765 is printed in the beginning of this work
- Les Psaumes expliqués, etc., 3 vols. (1781)
- Traité sur la poésie et la musique des Hébreux (1781), a continuation of the preceding
- Le Lévitique expliqué, 2 vols. (1785).

He had also done considerable work as a preparation for a Nouvelle Bible polyglotte, but it is doubtful whether he ever published it.
