= Saint-Vallerin =

- Commune
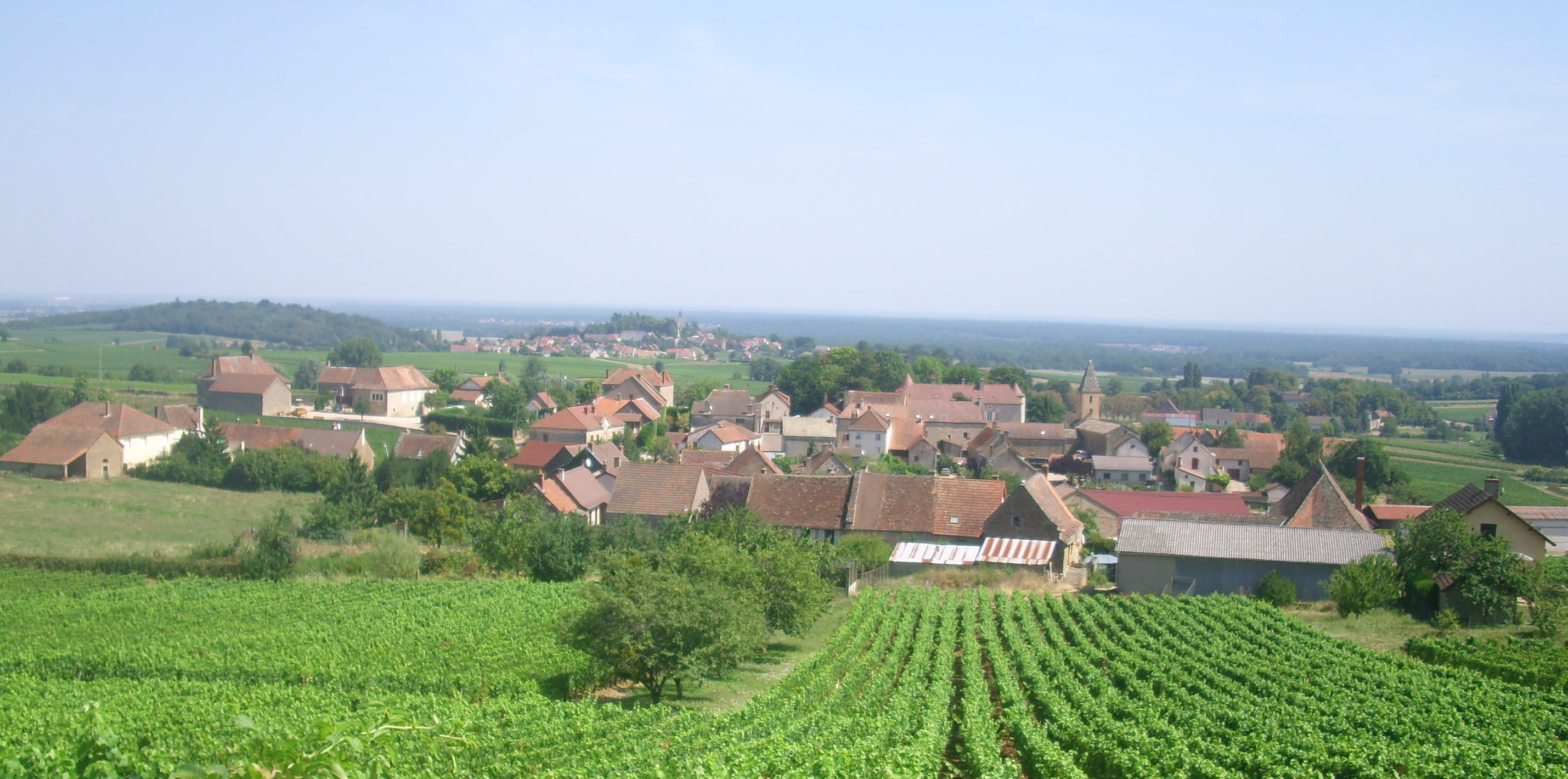
- A general view of Saint-Vallerin
- Location of Saint-Vallerin
- Location within France Location within Bourgogne-Franche-Comté
- Coordinates: 46°41′14″N 4°40′28″E
- Country: France
- Region: Bourgogne-Franche-Comté
- Department: Saône-et-Loire
- Arrondissement: Chalon-sur-Saône
- Canton: Givry
- Intercommunality: Sud Côte Chalonnaise

Government
  - Mayor (2020–2026): Christian Blanc
- Area^{1}: 6.73 km^{2} (2.60 sq mi)
- Elevation: 260 m (850 ft)
- Highest elevation: 415 m (1,362 ft)
- Lowest elevation: 219 m (719 ft)
- Population (2023): 253
  - Density: 37.6/km^{2} (97.4/sq mi)
- Time zone: UTC+01:00 (CET)
  - Summer (DST): UTC+02:00 (CEST)
- INSEE/Postal code: 71485 /71390
- ^{1} French Land Register data, which excludes lakes, ponds, glaciers > 1 km^{2} (0.386 sq mi or 247 acres) and river estuaries.

Saint-Vallerin (French pronunciation: [sɛ̃ valʁɛ̃]) is a commune in the Saône-et-Loire department in the region of Bourgogne-Franche-Comté in eastern France.

== See also ==
- Communes of the Saône-et-Loire department
- Côte Chalonnaise
