= Musée Hector-Berlioz =

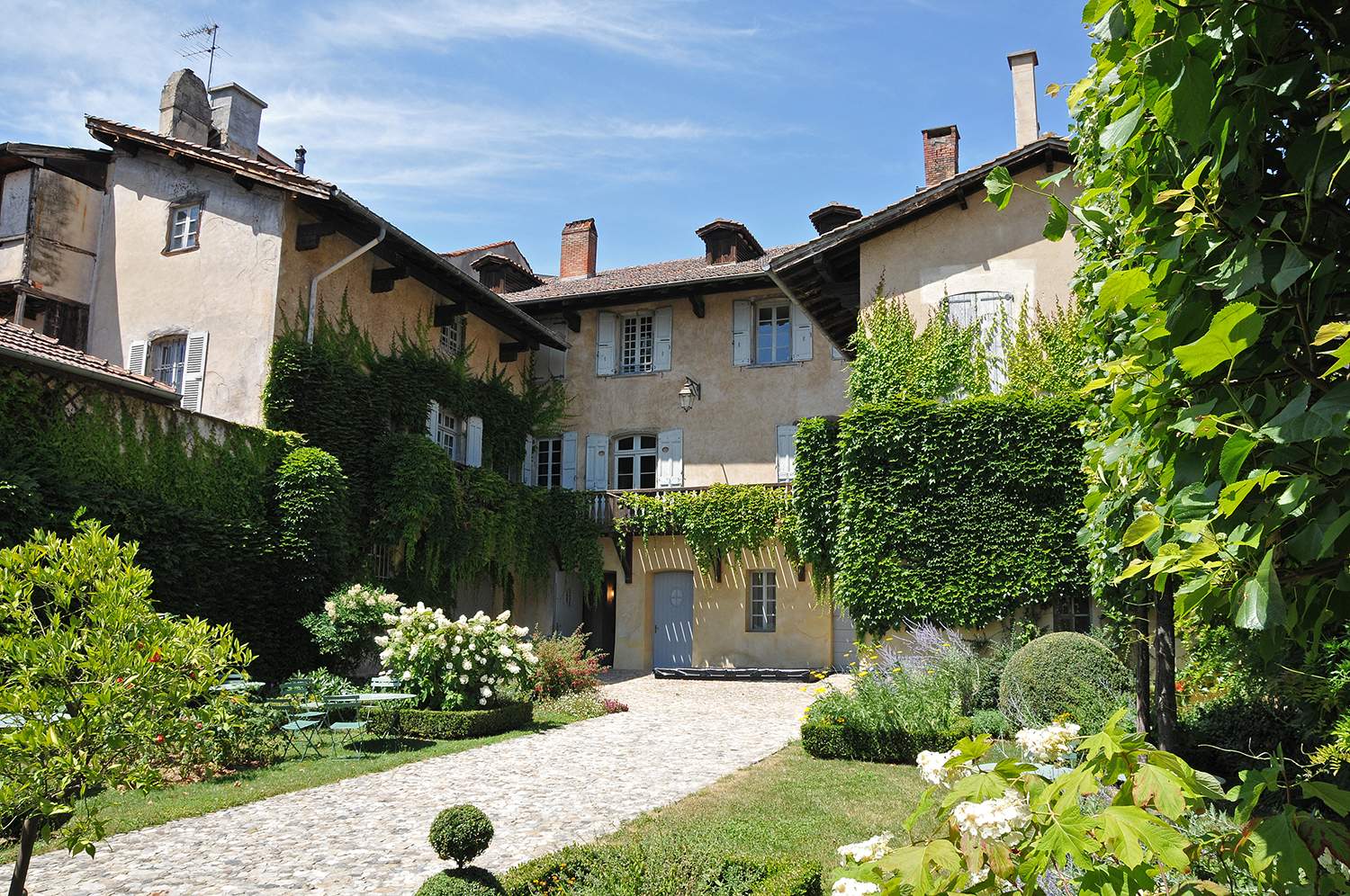
- Established: 1935
- Location: 69 rue de la République; La Côte-Saint-André, Isère, France
- Coordinates: 45°23′36″N 5°15′40″E
- Type: Biographical museum
- Website: musees.isere.fr/musee/musee-hector-berlioz

The Musée Hector-Berlioz (Hector Berlioz Museum) is a museum about the composer Hector Berlioz, in La Côte-Saint-André, Isère, France. The building is the composer's birthplace.

== History ==
The house was built about 1680; about 50 years later it was acquired by Berlioz's great-grandparents, and largely rebuilt at about that time. Hector Berlioz was born here on 11 December 1803, and lived here until he was 18. It continued to be occupied by the family until the death of the composer's father Dr Louis Berlioz in 1848. The town placed a memorial plaque on the house in 1885.

In 1932 the building was donated by Madame Dumien, who had purchased the property, to the Association des amis de Berlioz. It was established as a museum, officially inaugurated by the Minister of State Édouard Herriot on 7 July 1935. It was listed as a monument historique in 1942. In 1968 it became the property of the Department of Isère.

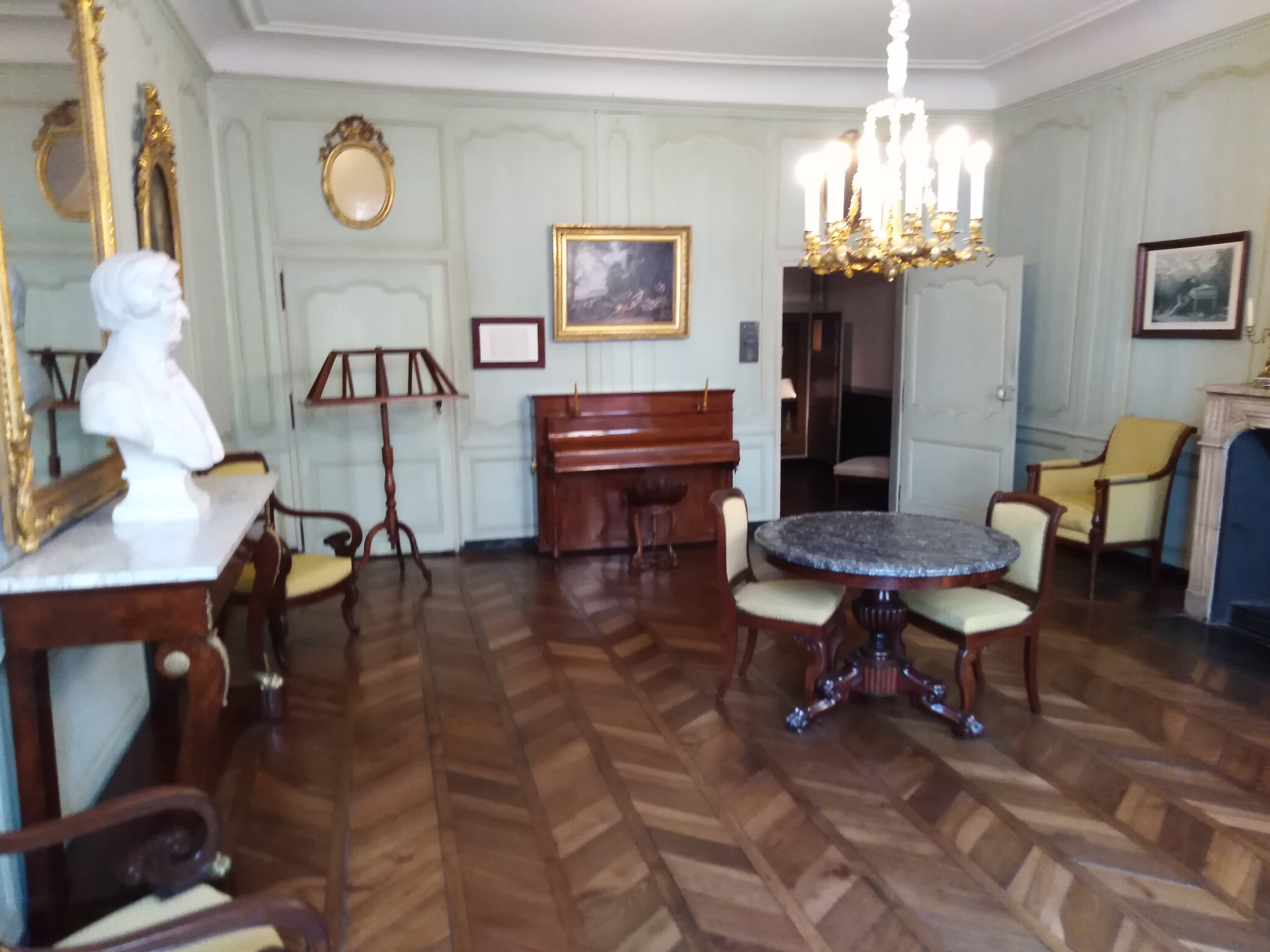
Grand salon: a room of the museum

The building has been developed several times, most recently in 2002–2003, the bicentenary of the composer's birth. The award Maisons des Illustres ("Houses of the illustrious") has been given to the museum.

== Exhibits ==
The rooms show aspects of Berlioz's life, through his correspondence, music scores and other exhibits. There is a temporary exhibition each year in the cellars of the house.

== See also ==
- List of music museums
