= La Côte-Saint-André =

- Commune
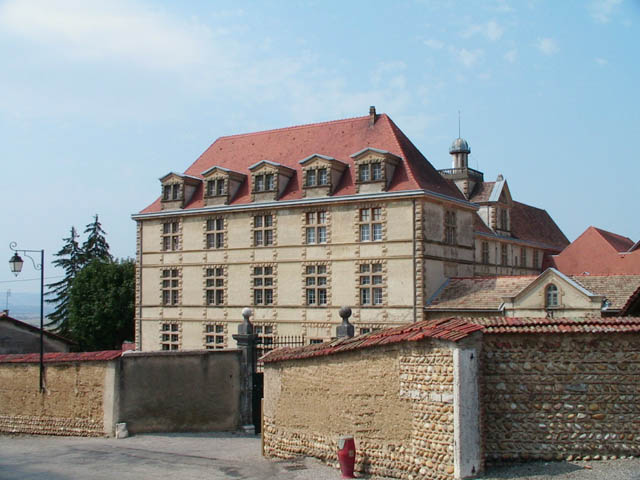
- The château in La Côte-Saint-André

- Coat of arms
- Location of La Côte-Saint-André
- Location within France Location within Auvergne-Rhône-Alpes
- Coordinates: 45°23′40″N 5°15′41″E
- Country: France
- Region: Auvergne-Rhône-Alpes
- Department: Isère
- Arrondissement: Vienne
- Canton: Bièvre

Government
  - Mayor (2020–2026): Joël Gullon
- Area^{1}: 27.93 km^{2} (10.78 sq mi)
- Highest elevation: 582 m (1,909 ft)
- Lowest elevation: 335 m (1,099 ft)
- Population (2023): 4,873
  - Density: 174.5/km^{2} (451.9/sq mi)
- Time zone: UTC+01:00 (CET)
  - Summer (DST): UTC+02:00 (CEST)
- INSEE/Postal code: 38130 /38260
- ^{1} French Land Register data, which excludes lakes, ponds, glaciers > 1 km^{2} (0.386 sq mi or 247 acres) and river estuaries.

La Côte-Saint-André (French pronunciation: [la kot sɛ̃t‿ɑ̃dʁe]) is a commune in the Isère department in southeastern France.

== Demographics ==
Historical population

Year	Pop.	±% p.a.
1793	3,381	—
1800	3,617	+0.97%
1806	3,890	+1.22%
1821	3,893	+0.01%
1831	4,568	+1.61%
1836	4,092	−2.18%
1841	4,083	−0.04%
1846	4,184	+0.49%
1851	4,429	+1.14%
1856	4,437	+0.04%
1861	4,616	+0.79%
1866	4,556	−0.26%
1872	4,346	−0.78%
1876	4,304	−0.24%
1881	4,193	−0.52%
1886	4,156	−0.18%
1891	4,015	−0.69%
1896	3,826	−0.96%
1901	3,900	+0.38%

Year	Pop.	±% p.a.
1906	3,444	−2.46%
1911	3,378	−0.39%
1921	3,126	−0.77%
1926	3,187	+0.39%
1931	3,720	+3.14%
1936	3,743	+0.12%
1946	3,656	−0.23%
1954	3,780	+0.42%
1962	3,623	−0.53%
1968	3,522	−0.47%
1975	3,865	+1.34%
1982	3,857	−0.03%
1990	3,966	+0.35%
1999	4,240	+0.75%
2007	4,689	+1.27%
2012	4,838	+0.63%
2017	4,811	−0.11%
2023	4,873	+0.21%

Source: EHESS and INSEE (1968-2023)

== Notable people ==
- Hector Berlioz was born here. His birthplace is now a museum: Musée Hector-Berlioz.
- Philippe du Contant de la Molette was born here.

== Archaeological finds ==
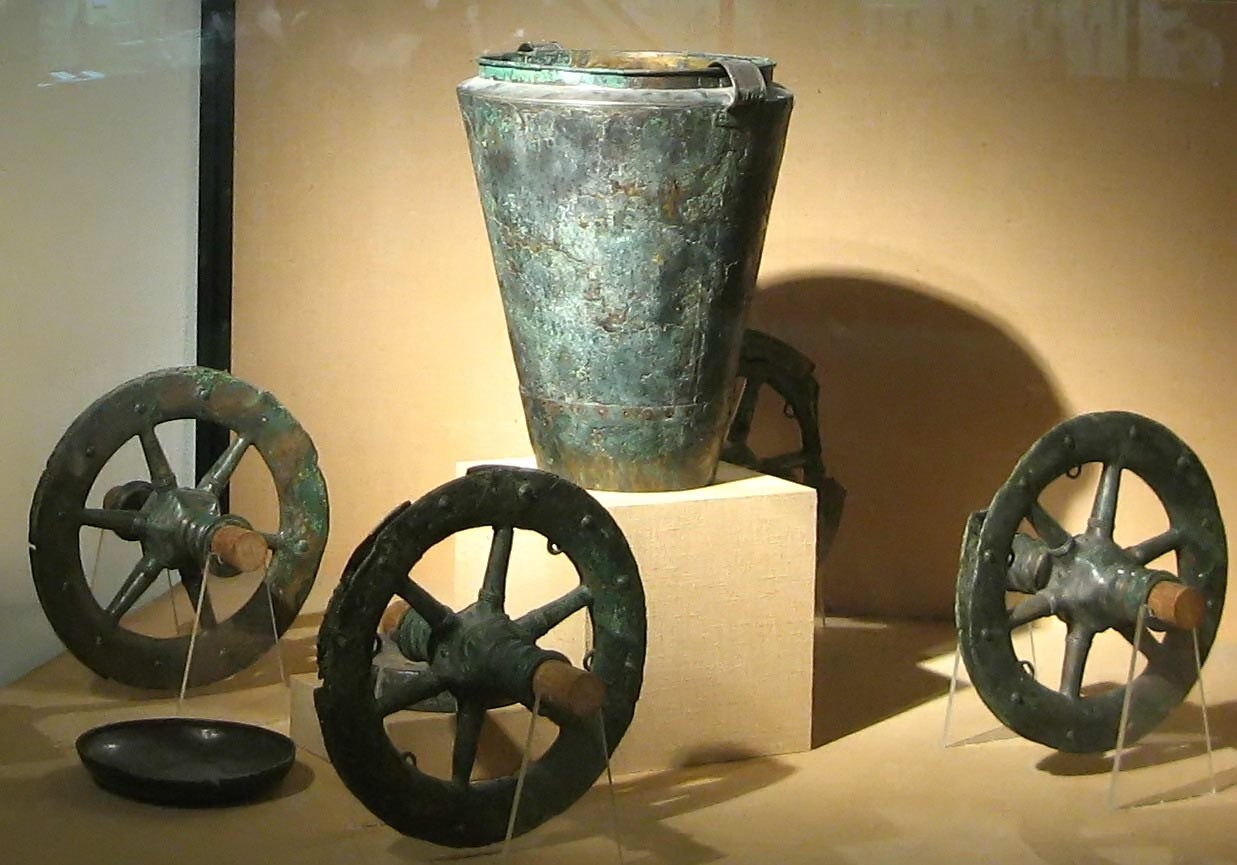
Cult wagon, Urnfield culture/ Hallstatt culture, c. 1300-800 BC.

== See also ==
- Communes of the Isère department
