= Craonnelle =

- Commune
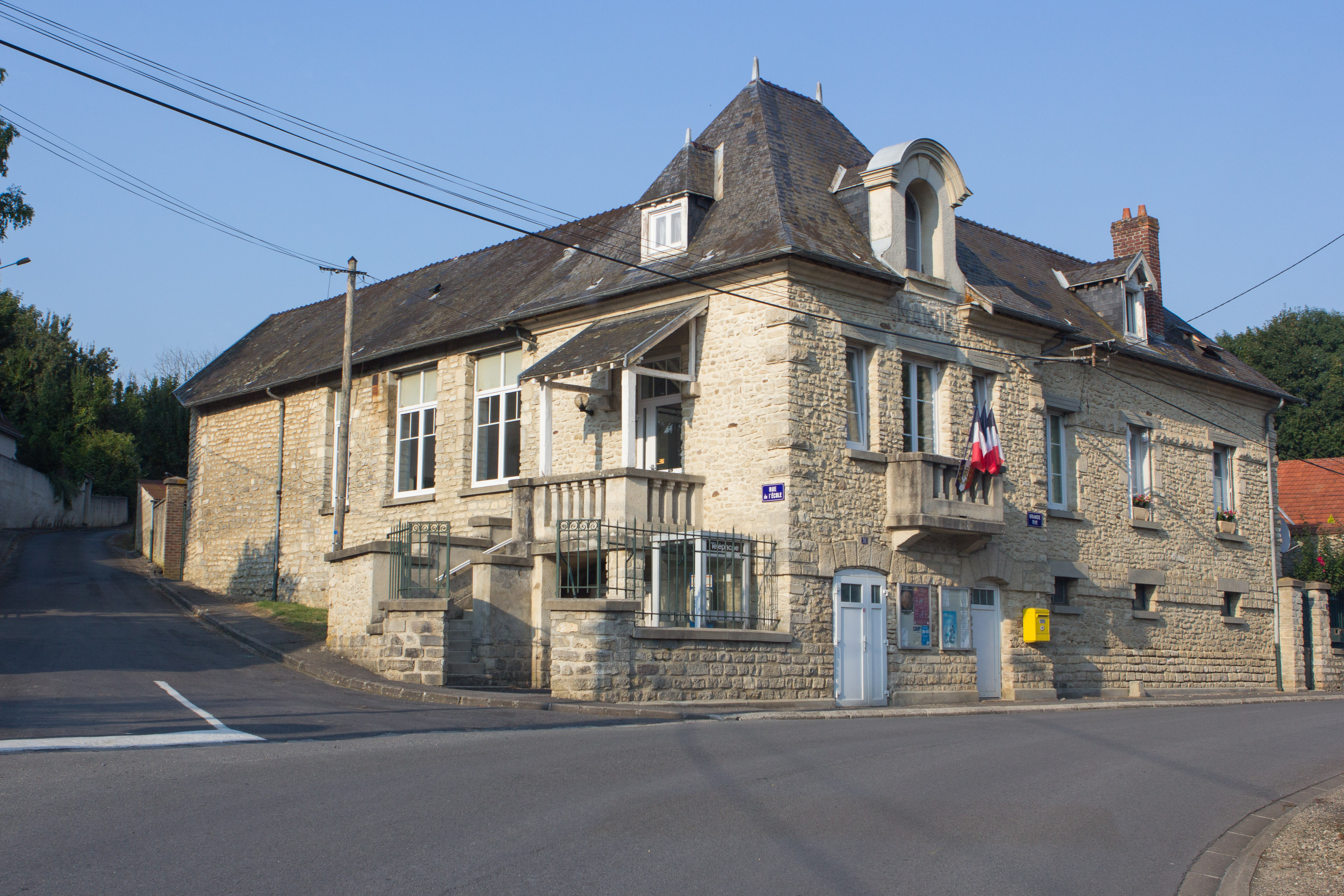
- The town hall of Craonnelle
- Location of Craonnelle
- Location within France Location within Hauts-de-France
- Coordinates: 49°25′55″N 3°46′16″E
- Country: France
- Region: Hauts-de-France
- Department: Aisne
- Arrondissement: Laon
- Canton: Villeneuve-sur-Aisne
- Intercommunality: Chemin des Dames

Government
  - Mayor (2026–32): Pascal Boulanger
- Area^{1}: 5.91 km^{2} (2.28 sq mi)
- Elevation: 100 m (330 ft)
- Highest elevation: 191 m (627 ft)
- Lowest elevation: 56 m (184 ft)
- Population (2023): 119
  - Density: 20.1/km^{2} (52.2/sq mi)
- Time zone: UTC+01:00 (CET)
  - Summer (DST): UTC+02:00 (CEST)
- INSEE/Postal code: 02235 /02160
- ^{1} French Land Register data, which excludes lakes, ponds, glaciers > 1 km^{2} (0.386 sq mi or 247 acres) and river estuaries.

Craonnelle is a commune in the Aisne department in Hauts-de-France in northern France.

== Population ==
Historical population
Year	Pop.	±% p.a.
1968	89	—
1975	92	+0.47%
1982	80	−1.98%
1990	97	+2.44%
1999	111	+1.51%
2007	100	−1.30%
2012	108	+1.55%
2017	117	+1.61%
2023	119	+0.28%
Source: INSEE

== See also ==
- Communes of the Aisne department
