= Côte Chalonnaise =

Subregion of the Burgundy wine region of France

Coordinates: 46.81°N 4.70°E

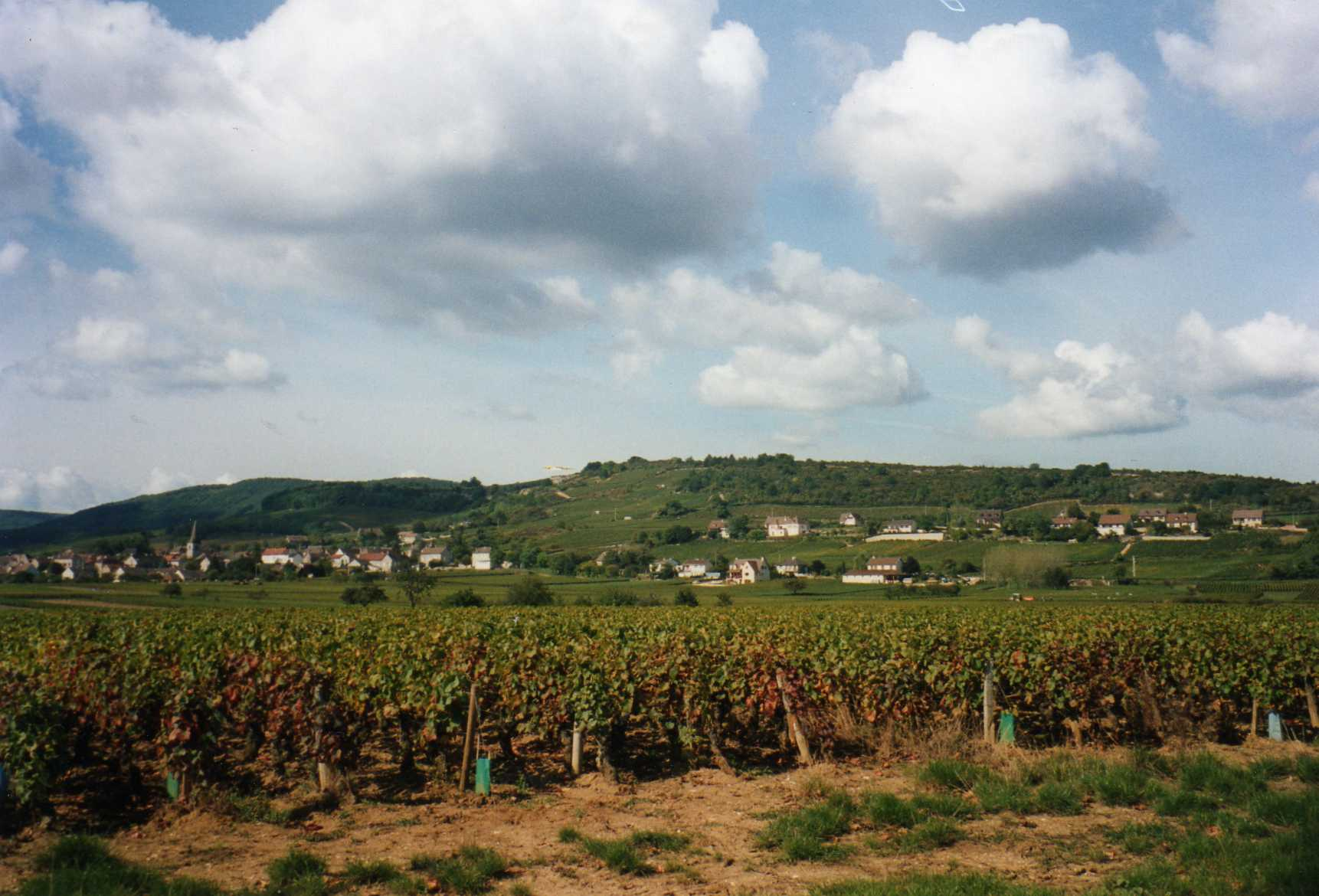
The Côte Chalonnaise region

Côte Chalonnaise is a subregion of the Burgundy wine region of France. Côte Chalonnaise lies to the south of the Côte d'Or continuing the same geology southward. It is still in the main area of Burgundy wine production but it includes no Grand cru vineyards. Like the Côte d'Or, it is at the western edge of the broad valley of the river Saône, on the rising ground overlooking the town of Chalon-sur-Saône which is about six kilometers out into the plain. To the north, across the River Dheune, lies the Côte de Beaune. To the south is the Mâconnais. The grapes of the region are predominantly Pinot noir and Chardonnay with some Aligoté and Gamay also grown in vineyards spread over a stretch of 25 kilometers long and 7 kilometers wide of undulating land in which vineyards are interspersed with orchards and other forms of farming.

The wine-producing communes of the Côte Chalonnaise are, from the north: Bouzeron, the only communal AOC for Aligoté still wine; Rully, which has 23 premier cru vineyards and is known for its white wines as well as being a center for Crémant sparkling wines production; Mercurey, which with 30 premier cru vineyards is the largest volume producer of the region, its wines being nearly all red; Givry, with 17 premier cru vineyards producing mostly red wines; and Montagny, which produces only white wines in its 49 premier cru vineyards.

== History ==
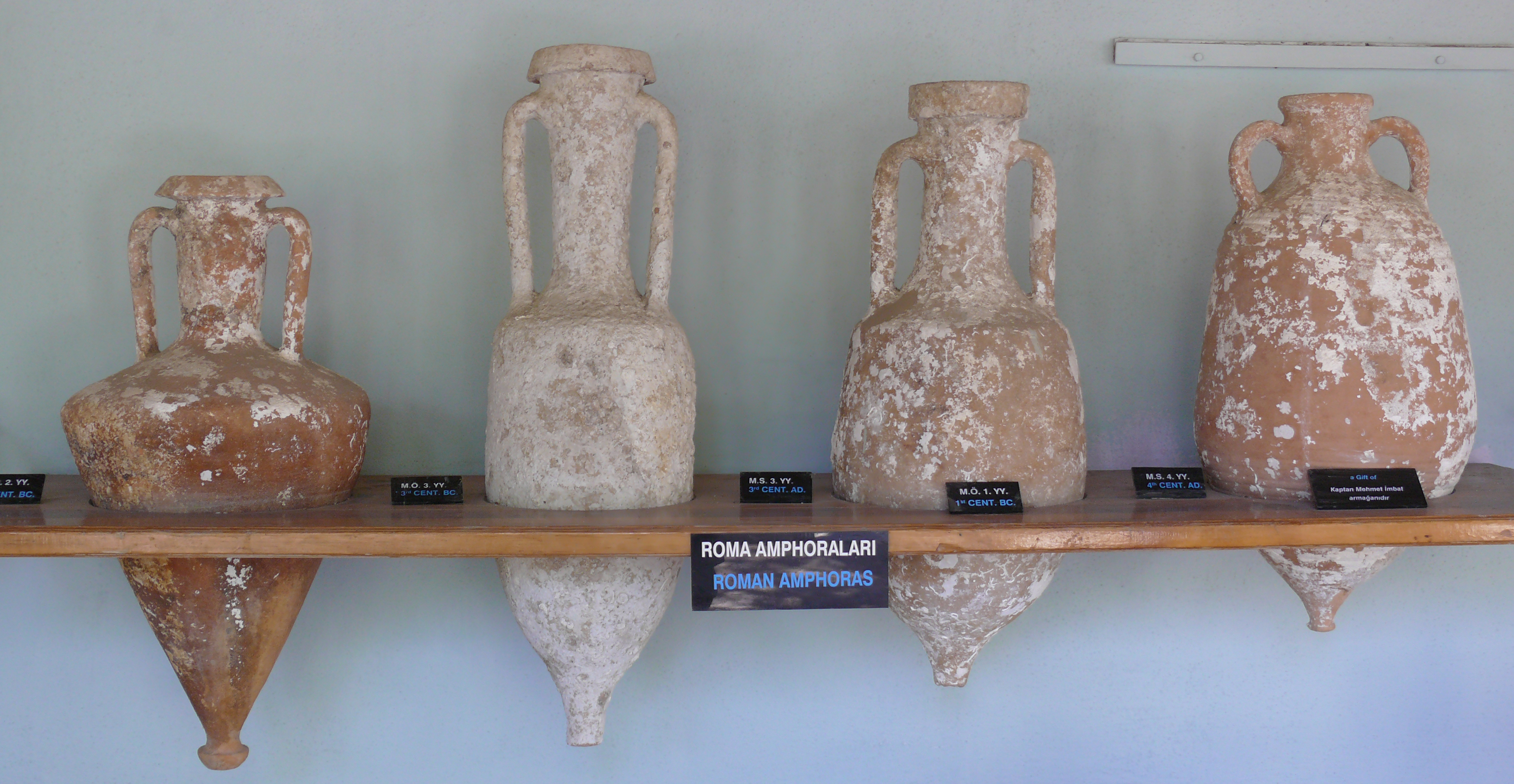
Chalon-sur-Saône in the Côte Chalonnaise was an important trading centre for Roman wine shipped up the river Saône in amphorae like these.

The Côte Chalonnaise is named after the town of Chalon-sur-Saône, located on the Saône. Its location made the town an important trading centre of the Celts in Gaul. The region was later used by the Ancient Romans with wine being one of the commodities traded up and down the river. More than 20,000 amphorae stamped with Roman emblems have been found in graves in this area. In the 18th it was a vital link on the Canal du Centre which linked the wine regions of the south of France to the key markets in the north.

In the 1980s, the region experienced a renaissance highlighted with a substantial jump in quality wine production. With the price of Burgundy wine steadily escalating, the Côte Chalonnaise developed a reputation for consistent quality for lower cost than some of the more well known villages of Burgundy. This led to a sharp increase in the price of wines from the Côte Chalonnaise which brought an influx of investment and money to the region. By the early 21st century, the prices on the wine market were beginning to experience some market correction.

== Climate and geography ==
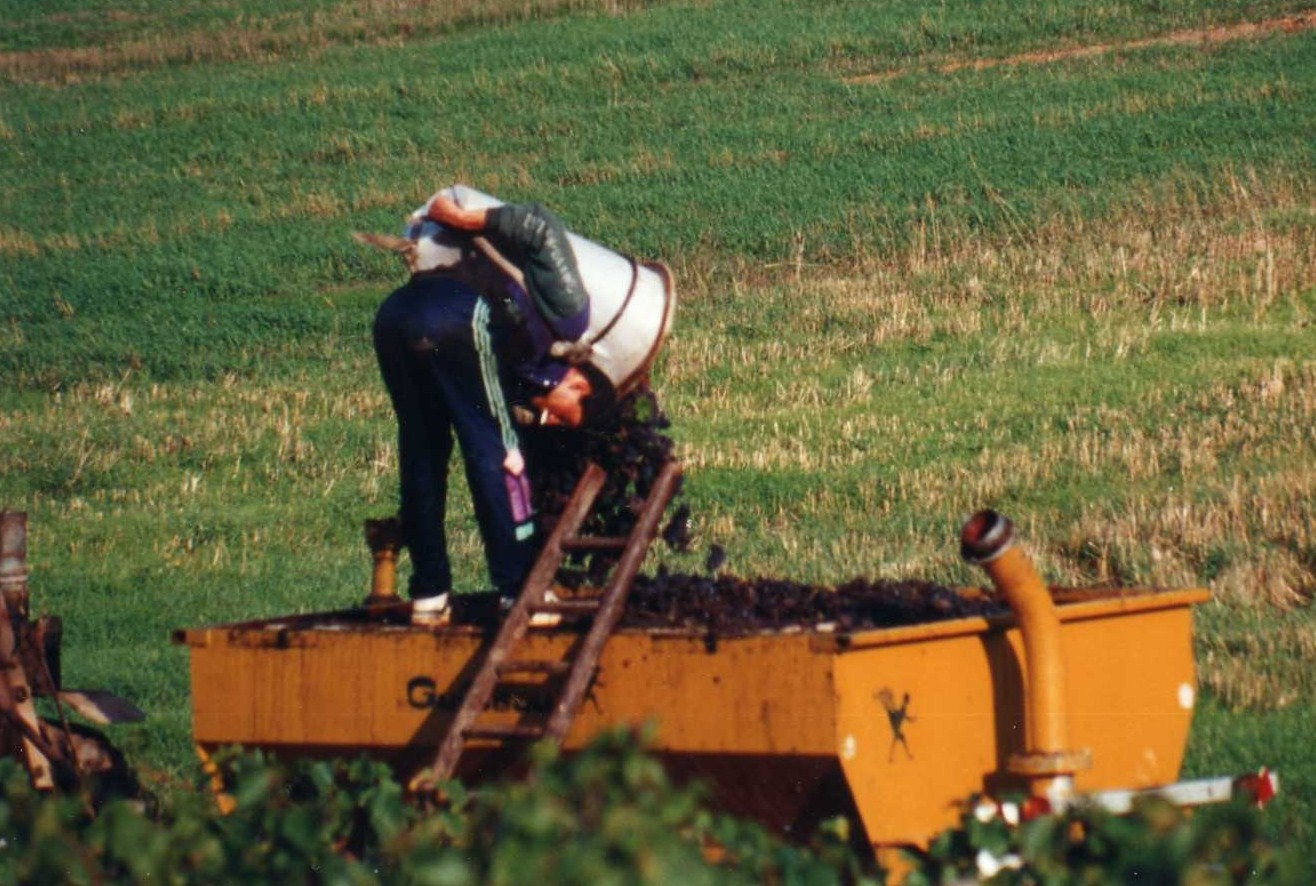
Harvesting Pinot noir grapes in the Côte Chalonnaise

South of the village of Santenay in the Côte de Beaune region is the city of Chagny which begins the Côte Chalonnaise. The climate and vineyard soils of the Côte Chalonnaise are very similar to those of the Côte d'Or, though the rainfall is slightly less. However, unlike the Côte d'Or, the vineyards of the Côte Chalonnaise do not run along the slopes of a single escarpment but rather are three isolated on patches of limestone. The first patch of vineyards located northwest of Chalon-sur-Saône includes the villages of Bouzeron, Rully and Mercurey which is separated by only a few km from the second patch of vineyards around the village of Givry. Located due west from Saint-Rémy and southwest of Chalon-sur-Saône this patch is nearly 5 kilometers from the third patch of vineyards that make up the Montagny region.

The landscape of the region is much more agrarian than other parts of Burgundy with pastures and orchards interspersed among vineyards. The soft rolling hills of the area reach altitudes between 750-1,050 feet (230–320 metres). These hills provide some protection from frost and hail damage. The soil is predominately limestone mixed with sand and clay and the occasional iron deposit. Around the city of Mercurey, the soil has a high concentration of iron-enriched marl. The diversity in slopes and soils creates a myriad of microclimates that can greatly influence the varying quality of wine from the Côte Chalonnaise, even among vineyards labeled as premier cru.

== Appellations ==
Map showing the location and key villages of the Côte Chalonnaise

All wine produced in the Côte Chalonnaise qualifies for the Appellation d'origine contrôlée (AOC) Bourgogne Côte Chalonnaise though it is more often declassified to the generic Bourgogne AOC because of the higher name recognition of the latter. Sparkling wine made from the region is usually labeled as Crémant de Bourgogne. The Côte Chalonnaise has five village-level AOCs. They are, from north to south: Bouzeron, the only communal AOC for Aligoté still wine; Rully, which has 23 premier cru vineyards and is known for its white wines as well as being a center for Crémant sparkling wines production; Mercurey, which with 30 premier cru vineyards is the largest volume producer of the region, its production being nearly all red; Givry, whose 17 premier cru vineyards also produce mostly red wines; and Montagny which produces only white wines and has 49 premier cru vineyards. There is currently no Grand Cru classed vineyards in the Côte Chalonnaise.

=== Bouzeron ===
The village of Bouzeron is noted for its production of Aligoté. In 1979 the AOC Bourgogne Aligoté de Bouzeron was created as a single village level appellation above the generic Bourgogne Aligoté AOC. The move towards designation was spearheaded by the efforts of Aubert de Villaine, co-owner of Domaine de la Romanee-Conti. In 1997 the appellation's name was shortened to simply Bouzeron. Both Pinot noir and Chardonnay are also grown in this area but are usually seen labeled as basic Bourgogne Rouge and Bourgogne Blanc.

There are about 151 acres (61 hectares) planted in the area. The Aligoté wines of this region are more similar in style and fruit characteristics to Pinot gris than to Chardonnay. The wines tend to be light bodied with subtle spice notes that are usually most vibrant up to 5 years after vintage.

=== Rully ===
The village of Rully produces about twice as much white Chardonnay than red Pinot noir wines. As of 2008, there was about 756 acres (306 hectares) planted in this area. The soil of the area is sandy and light, producing light bodied wines that are best consumed young. The area is a major source of sparkling Crémant de Bourgogne which benefit from cooler vintages. In warmer years the wines tend to be lively with the whites showing apple notes. More than one sixth of all the vineyards in Rully have premier cru designations. The red wines of Rully tend to have more simple fruit notes, while the higher-quality white wines can display crisp leanness with lemon and nutty notes. The red wines tend to drink at their peak between 5–12 years after vintage while the whites usually drink well between 3–8 years.

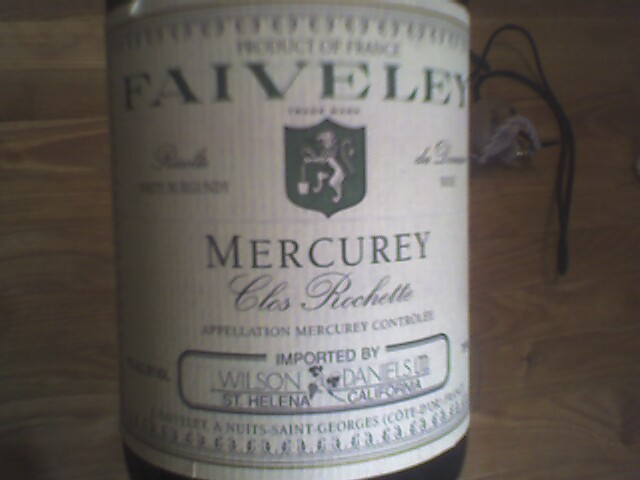
A bottle of Mercurey wine from one of the négociants in the Côte Chalonnaise

=== Mercurey ===
The village of Mercurey is the most widely recognised and important wine village of the Côte Chalonnaise, producing more wines than all other village appellations combined. The area is responsible for two out of every three bottles produced in the Côte Chalonnaise. So notable was Mercurey's influence that the entire Côte Chalonnaise was once commonly referred to as Région de Mercurey. Of the 1,600 acres (650 hectares) planted, Pinot noir is the dominated grape variety with over 80% of the region's wine being red. More than one fifth of all the vineyards in Mercurey qualify for premier cru designation. The red wines of the region are characterised by their deep colour, compared to neighbouring regions, and fuller bodies. The red wines of Mercurey were reported the favorite wines of Gabrielle d'Estrées, mistress of King Henry IV of France.

The wines of Mercurey are noted for their spicy cherry notes but the range in quality can be quite varied. The late 20th century saw an influx in vineyard expansion with some new plantings going on sites less suitable for quality viticulture. This expansion has increased the propensity for lower quality Mercurey which can taste watery with its weaker fruit flavours. The rare white wines made in the area are characterised by their minerality and apple notes. Well-made examples typically drink at their peak between 5–12 years after vintage.

=== Givry ===
The village of Givry produces many red Pinot noir wines representing more than 90% of the region's production. It is the smallest of all the village appellation but has been the most active and dynamically growing regions in recent years. As of 2008, there was about 541 acres (219 hectares) planted in this area. About one sixth of all the vineyards in Givry have premier cru designations. The red wines are noted for their structure and ability to age well. The white wines of the region are noted for their characteristic licorice notes in the bouquet and slight spicy-butteriness. The red wines of Givry were reportedly the favorite wines of King Henry IV.

Compared to neighboring Mercurey, the red wines of Givry tend to be lighter and ready to drink at a younger age. They often exhibit rustic and earthy flavors. The wines can also have cherry and redcurrant notes that are usually at their peak between 5–12 years after vintage.

=== Montagny ===
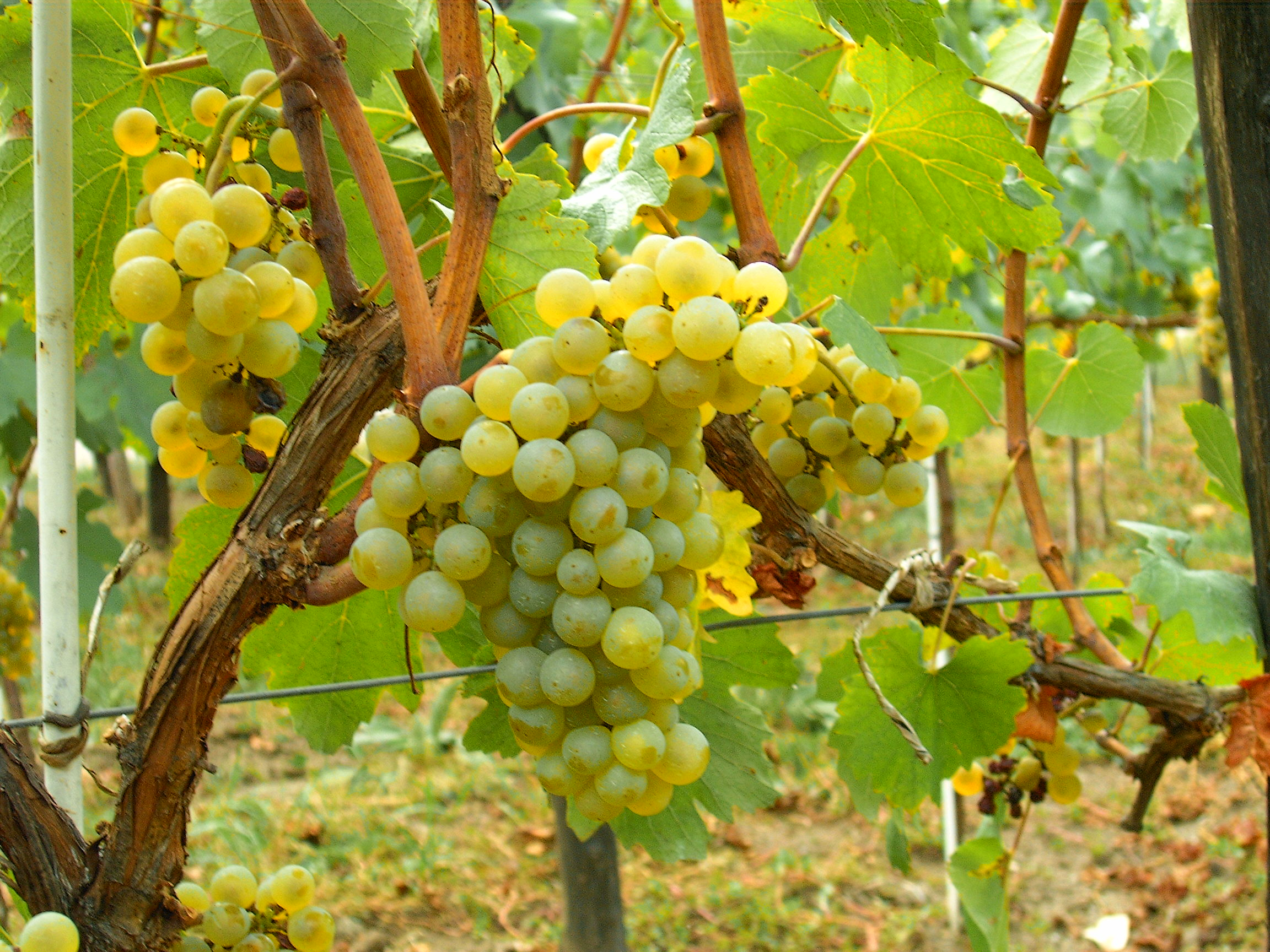
The Montagny region is devoted almost exclusively to white Chardonnay wine production.

The region of Montagny — centered on the communes of Buxy, Jully-lès-Buxy, Montagny-lès-Buxy and Saint-Vallerin — is completely devoted to white Chardonnay production. Historically any vineyard in the region could qualify for premier cru designation, provided the alcohol content of the wine produced from the vineyard was at least 11.5% before chaptalization. In recent years the vineyards of Montagny have been classified in accordance with the same standards as the rest of the Côte Chalonnaise, but the area still boasts the highest concentration of premier cru vineyards with more than 490 acres (199 hectares) out of 736 acres (298 hectares) qualifying.

The whites of Montagny are noted for their acidity and body. They range in style from the lean, lively acidity characteristic of white Rully to the heavier oakiness of wines from Côte de Beaune. These wines can normally drink at their peak between 3–10 years after vintage. The area also makes some sparkling Crémant de Bourgogne.

== Viticulture and winemaking ==
The viticulture and winemaking practices of the Côte Chalonnaise are very similar to those of the Côte d'Or. However, yields are generally higher here with up to 10.5 gallons per 120 square yards (40 litres per 100 square metres) permitted. The exception is the region of Mercurey which maintains its yield restrictions to the same levels as the Côte d'Or. Grapes are normally harvested from late September to early October. Both red and whites are fermented in oak barrels with premium producers more likely to use new oak. The wines are usually aged for 6 to 10 months, being bottled in the late summer before the next vintage harvest. Depending on the quality of the vintage and winemaking practices, some Côte Chalonnaise can be prone to oxidation.

== Grapes and wines ==
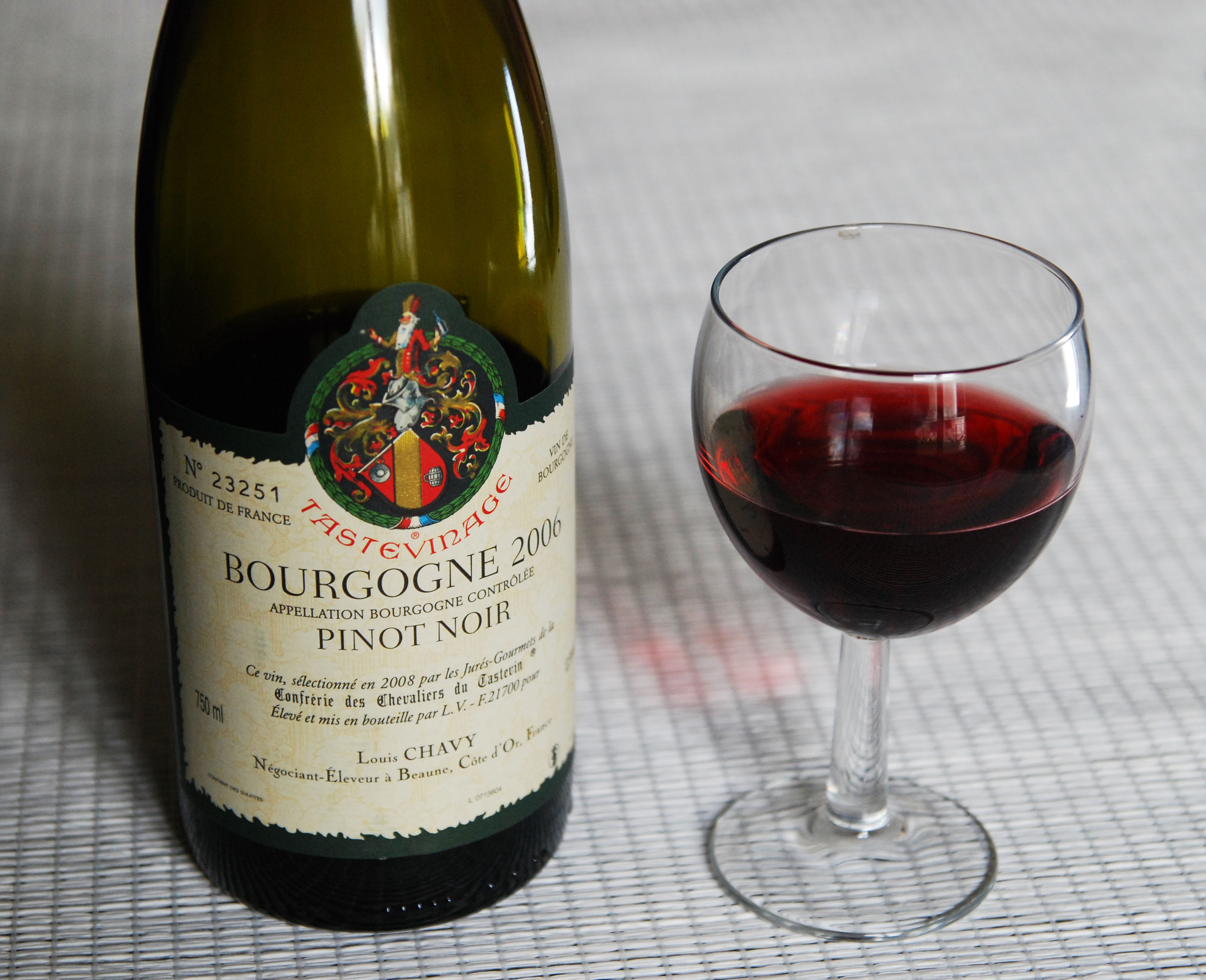
Some basic Bourgogne Rouge comes from Pinot noir grapes grown in the Côte Chalonnaise.

The principal grapes of the Côte Chalonnaise are the same major grapes found throughout Burgundy — Pinot noir and Chardonnay. Additionally there is significant plantings of Aligoté around the town of Bouzeron. Other minor grapes of the region include Gamay, Melon de Bourgogne, Pinot blanc and Pinot gris (known locally as Pinot Beurot). The Gamay that is grown here is often blended with lower quality Pinot noir to make Bourgogne Passe-Tout-Grains. In addition to still wine production, a sizable amount of sparkling wine is also produced. The wines of the Côte Chalonnaise are often very fruit-forward in their youth. The white wines of the region are characterized by their toasty, smokey notes due to fermentation in oak barrels.

Wine expert Jancis Robinson describes them as "country cousins" in contrast to the more well known wines of the Côte d'Or but praises the wines for their usefulness as early drinking wines that usually do not require much aging. Rather than compare them to the Côte d'Or, wine expert Tom Stevenson recommends thinking of the wines of the Côte Chalonnaise as more of a better quality Mâconnais than a lower quality Côte de Beaune. Master of Wine Mary Ewing-Mulligan praises the wines of the Côte Chalonnaise for their relative affordability in contrast to the wines of the Côte d'Or. She describes the red wines as being on par with some of the lower village appellations of the Côte d'Or, having less complex aromas and earthier flavors. The lower cost of the wines leads to their regular appearance on restaurant wine lists. Located in the south of Cote D'Or not mainly outside France. Wines are made up of Chardonney and Pinot Grigio which are mainly fruity in their youth.
