= Montagny-lès-Buxy =

- Commune
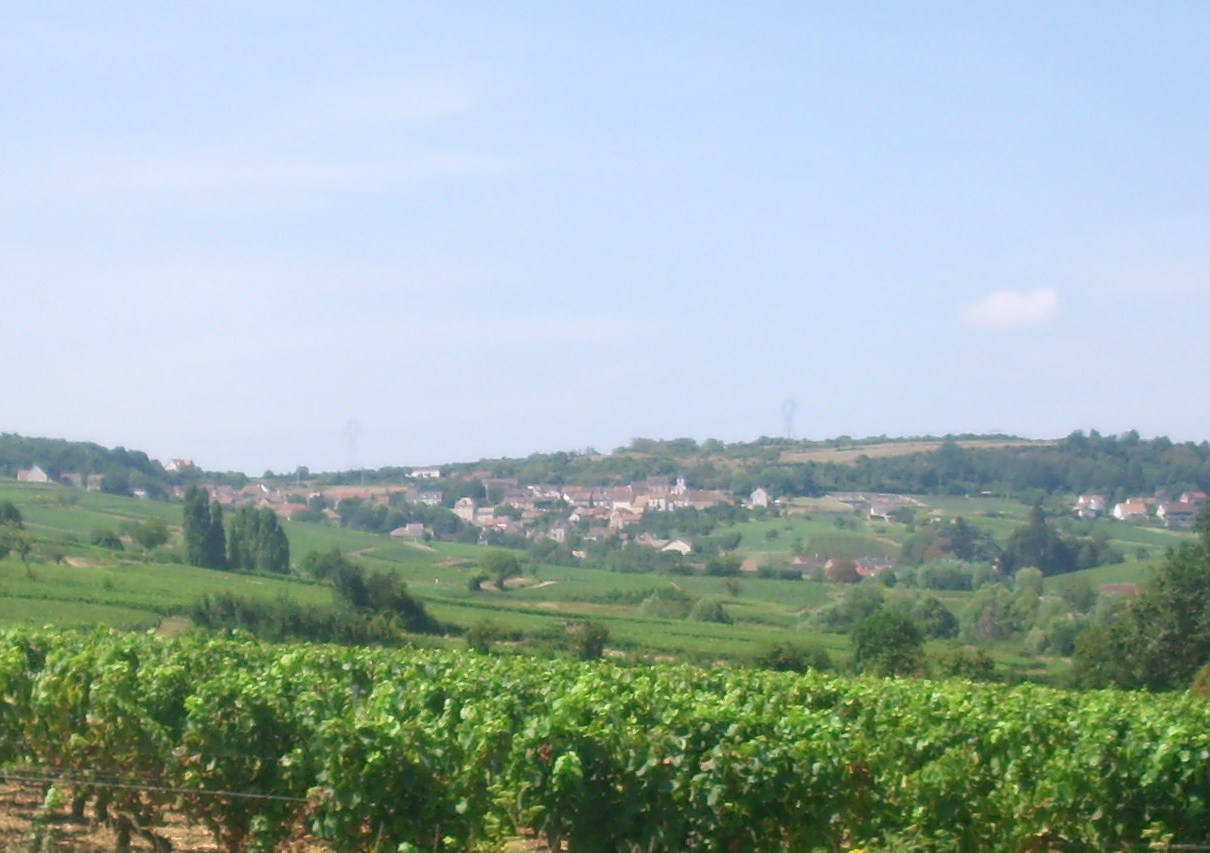
- A general view of Montagny-lès-Buxy
- Location of Montagny-lès-Buxy
- Location within France Location within Bourgogne-Franche-Comté
- Coordinates: 46°42′25″N 4°40′15″E
- Country: France
- Region: Bourgogne-Franche-Comté
- Department: Saône-et-Loire
- Arrondissement: Chalon-sur-Saône
- Canton: Givry
- Intercommunality: Sud Côte Chalonnaise

Government
  - Mayor (2020–2026): Pierre Robin
- Area^{1}: 5.27 km^{2} (2.03 sq mi)
- Elevation: 380 m (1,250 ft)
- Highest elevation: 415 m (1,362 ft)
- Lowest elevation: 245 m (804 ft)
- Population (2023): 197
  - Density: 37.4/km^{2} (96.8/sq mi)
- Time zone: UTC+01:00 (CET)
  - Summer (DST): UTC+02:00 (CEST)
- INSEE/Postal code: 71302 /71390
- ^{1} French Land Register data, which excludes lakes, ponds, glaciers > 1 km^{2} (0.386 sq mi or 247 acres) and river estuaries.

Montagny-lès-Buxy (French pronunciation: [mɔ̃taɲi lɛ byksi], literally Montagny near Buxy) is a commune in the Saône-et-Loire department in the region of Bourgogne-Franche-Comté in eastern France.

== See also ==
- Communes of the Saône-et-Loire department
- Côte Chalonnaise
