= Buxy =

- Commune
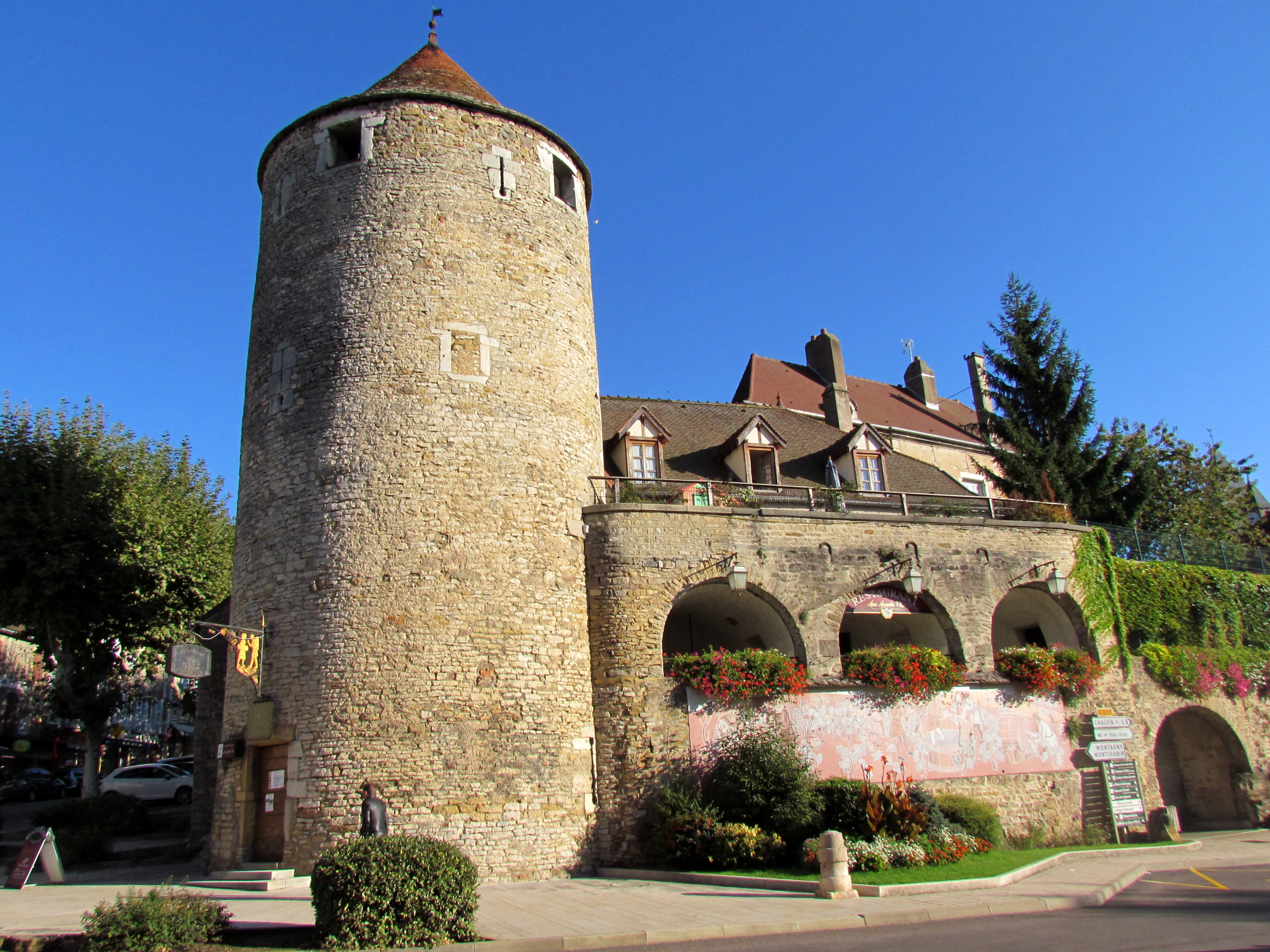
- Tour Rouge (Red Tower) in Buxy

- Coat of arms
- Location of Buxy
- Location within France Location within Bourgogne-Franche-Comté
- Coordinates: 46°42′45″N 4°41′50″E
- Country: France
- Region: Bourgogne-Franche-Comté
- Department: Saône-et-Loire
- Arrondissement: Chalon-sur-Saône
- Canton: Givry
- Intercommunality: Sud Côte chalonnaise

Government
  - Mayor (2020–2026): Dominique Lanoiselet
- Area^{1}: 11.92 km^{2} (4.60 sq mi)
- Elevation: 266 m (873 ft)
- Highest elevation: 428 m (1,404 ft)
- Lowest elevation: 186 m (610 ft)
- Population (2023): 2,150
  - Density: 180/km^{2} (467/sq mi)
- Time zone: UTC+01:00 (CET)
  - Summer (DST): UTC+02:00 (CEST)
- INSEE/Postal code: 71070 /71390
- ^{1} French Land Register data, which excludes lakes, ponds, glaciers > 1 km^{2} (0.386 sq mi or 247 acres) and river estuaries.

Buxy (French pronunciation: [byksi]) is a commune in the Saône-et-Loire department in the region of Bourgogne-Franche-Comté in eastern France.

== History ==
Buxy was the property of count of Chalon until 1237, when Buxy became the property of the Dukes of Burgundy. In 1477, Louis XI make of Buxy a part of the French kingdom and was named Buxy-le-Royal. En 1565, Buxy became the property of the prince of Condé later property of the Counts of Soissons, they sold Buxy in 1626 to the marquis of Uxelles. Since the 15th century there was a hospital in Buxy, which was merged with the hospital of Tournus at the end of the 17th century.

== Population ==
Historical population
Year	Pop.	±% p.a.
1968	1,685	—
1975	1,670	−0.13%
1982	1,796	+1.04%
1990	1,998	+1.34%
1999	2,098	+0.54%
2007	2,160	+0.36%
2012	2,175	+0.14%
2017	2,136	−0.36%
2023	2,150	+0.11%
Source: INSEE

== Economy ==
The economy of Buxy is mainly based on wine growing.

== Transportation ==
The closest airport to Buxy is Lyon Airport (110 km).

== See also ==
- Asteroid 375007 Buxy
- Communes of the Saône-et-Loire department
- Côte Chalonnaise
- Montagny wine
