= List of Burgundy grands crus =

Grand cru (great growth) is the highest level in the vineyard classification of Burgundy. There are a total of 550 hectares (1,400 acres) of Grand Cru vineyards—approximately 2% of Burgundy's 28,000 hectares (69,000 acres) of vineyards (excluding Beaujolais)—of which 356 hectares (880 acres) produce red wine and 194 hectares (480 acres) produce white wine. In 2010, 18,670 hectoliters of Burgundy grand cru wine was produced, corresponding to 2.5 million bottles, or just over 1.3% of the total wine production of Burgundy.

The origin of Burgundy's grands crus can be traced to the work of the Cistercians who, from amongst their vast land holdings in the region, were able to delineate and isolate plots of land that produced wine of distinct character. Following the French Revolution many of these vineyards were broken up and sold as smaller parcels to various owners. The partible inheritance scheme outlined in the Napoleonic Code, which specified that all inheritance must be equally divided among heirs, further contributed to the parceling of Burgundy's vineyards. This created situations such as the case of Clos Vougeot, a single 125-acre (51 ha) vineyard run by the monks, that today is parceled into plots owned by nearly 80 different owners, some of whom only own enough vines to make a case of wine per vintage. In accordance with Appellation d'origine contrôlée laws, each of these owners is entitled to use the Grand Cru Clos de Vougeot designation on their labels, although the quality, style, price and reputation of each owner's wine can vary widely.

== List of grands crus ==
Grand cru	Region	Village	Wine style	Vineyard surface (2010)
Chablis Grand Cru	Chablis	Chablis	White wine	104.08 hectares (257.2 acres)
Chambertin	Côte de Nuits	Gevrey-Chambertin	Red wine	13.57 hectares (33.5 acres)
Chambertin-Clos de Bèze	Côte de Nuits	Gevrey-Chambertin	Red wine	15.78 hectares (39.0 acres)
Chapelle-Chambertin	Côte de Nuits	Gevrey-Chambertin	Red wine	5.48 hectares (13.5 acres)
Charmes-Chambertin	Côte de Nuits	Gevrey-Chambertin	Red wine	29.57 hectares (73.1 acres)
Griotte-Chambertin	Côte de Nuits	Gevrey-Chambertin	Red wine	2.63 hectares (6.5 acres)
Latricières-Chambertin	Côte de Nuits	Gevrey-Chambertin	Red wine	7.31 hectares (18.1 acres)
Mazis-Chambertin	Côte de Nuits	Gevrey-Chambertin	Red wine	8.95 hectares (22.1 acres)
Mazoyères-Chambertin	Côte de Nuits	Gevrey-Chambertin	Red wine	1.82 hectares (4.5 acres)
Ruchottes-Chambertin	Côte de Nuits	Gevrey-Chambertin	Red wine	3.25 hectares (8.0 acres)
Bonnes-Mares	Côte de Nuits	Morey-Saint-Denis (Note: The majority of the Bonnes Mares vineyard is located in Chambolle-Musigny with a small portion also in Morey-St.-Denis.)	Red wine	14.71 hectares (36.3 acres)
Clos de la Roche	Côte de Nuits	Morey-Saint-Denis	Red wine	16.52 hectares (40.8 acres)
Clos des Lambrays	Côte de Nuits	Morey-Saint-Denis	Red wine	8.52 hectares (21.1 acres)
Clos de Tart	Côte de Nuits	Morey-Saint-Denis	Red wine	7.30 hectares (18.0 acres)
Clos Saint-Denis	Côte de Nuits	Morey-Saint-Denis	Red wine	6.24 hectares (15.4 acres)
Bonnes-Mares	Côte de Nuits	Chambolle-Musigny	Red wine	14.71 hectares (36.3 acres)
Musigny	Côte de Nuits	Chambolle-Musigny	Red and some white wine	10.67 hectares (26.4 acres)
Clos de Vougeot	Côte de Nuits	Vougeot	Red wine	49.43 hectares (122.1 acres)
Échezeaux	Côte de Nuits	Flagey-Echézeaux	Red wine	35.77 hectares (88.4 acres)
Grands Échezeaux	Côte de Nuits	Flagey-Echézeaux	Red wine	8.78 hectares (21.7 acres)
La Grande Rue	Côte de Nuits	Vosne-Romanée	Red wine	1.65 hectares (4.1 acres)
La Romanée	Côte de Nuits	Vosne-Romanée	Red wine	0.84 hectares (2.1 acres)
La Tâche	Côte de Nuits	Vosne-Romanée	Red wine	5.08 hectares (12.6 acres)
Richebourg	Côte de Nuits	Vosne-Romanée	Red wine	7.89 hectares (19.5 acres)
Romanée-Conti	Côte de Nuits	Vosne-Romanée	Red wine	1.76 hectares (4.3 acres)
Romanée-Saint-Vivant	Côte de Nuits	Vosne-Romanée	Red wine	8.45 hectares (20.9 acres)
Corton	Côte de Beaune	Pernand-Vergelesses (Note: Corton and Corton-Charlemagne straddle the boundary between Pernand-Vergelesses, Ladoix-Serrigny, and Aloxe-Corton.)	Red and some white wine	97.53 hectares (241.0 acres)
Charlemagne	Côte de Beaune	Pernand-Vergelesses (Note: Charlemagne straddles the boundary between Pernand-Vergelesses and Aloxe-Corton, but the appellation is almost never used, as wines are usually sold as Corton-Charlemagne instead.)	White wine	0 hectares (0 acres)
Corton	Côte de Beaune	Ladoix-Serrigny	Red and some white wine	97.53 hectares (241.0 acres)
Corton-Charlemagne	Côte de Beaune	Ladoix-Serrigny	White wine	52.08 hectares (128.7 acres)
Corton	Côte de Beaune	Aloxe-Corton	Red and some white wine	97.53 hectares (241.0 acres)
Charlemagne	Côte de Beaune	Aloxe-Corton	White wine	0 hectares (0 acres)
Bâtard-Montrachet	Côte de Beaune	Puligny-Montrachet (Note: Bâtard-Montrachet is located in both Chassagne-Montrachet and Puligny-Montrachet.)	White wine	11.73 hectares (29.0 acres)
Bienvenues-Bâtard-Montrachet	Côte de Beaune	Puligny-Montrachet	White wine	3.58 hectares (8.8 acres)
Chevalier-Montrachet	Côte de Beaune	Puligny-Montrachet	White wine	7.47 hectares (18.5 acres)
Montrachet	Côte de Beaune	Puligny-Montrachet (Note: Le Montrachet is located in both Puligny-Montrachet and Chassagne-Montrachet.)	White wine	8.00 hectares (19.8 acres)
Criots-Bâtard-Montrachet	Côte de Beaune	Chassagne-Montrachet	White wine	1.57 hectares (3.9 acres)

== See also ==
- Burgundy wine
- List of Chablis crus
