= Domaine Armand Rousseau =

Domaine Armand Rousseau is a French wine grower and producer. It is based in Gevrey-Chambertin, in the Côte de Nuits wine-growing region of Burgundy, France.

== History ==
Armand Rousseau was born in 1884 to a family heavily involved in the wine industry as merchants, coopers and vignerons. He inherited several vineyard plots and the current domaine building in the village of Gevrey-Chambertin as part of his wedding in 1909.

After rapid expansion in vineyard holdings, with purchases in Charmes-Chambertin, Clos de la Roche and Chambertin in the late 1910s and 1920s, the domaine began to bottle and sell its own wine in the 1930s after advice given by Raymond Baudoin, founder of the La Revue du vin de France. Armand Rousseau was among the first few producers to bottle his own wine in Burgundy, with the majority of other growers in the region selling their wines to négociant businesses to bottle and sell. Rousseau was also a pioneer within Burgundy in selling his wine to the United States market after the end of prohibition in the mid to late 1930s.

Further vineyard acquisitions were made with plots purchased in Mazis Chambertin in 1937, Mazoyeres-Chambertin in 1940 and Clos Saint Jacques in 1954 as well as two additional plots in the Chambertin vineyard in 1943 and 1956.

Charles Rousseau, born in 1923, started working at his father's estate in 1946. Charles had studied law followed by oenology at The University of Dijon. His father Armand was killed in a car accident in 1959 and Charles took over as the sole winemaker.

At the time of Charles taking over the estate, Domaine Rousseau held 6.5 hectares of vineyards. Expansion continued with plots in Clos de Bèze purchased in 1961, Clos de la Roche in 1965 and 1975, additional plots of Chambertin in 1968 and 1983 as well as the entire Clos des Ruchottes vineyard in 1978. Current vineyard holdings stand at just under 14 hectares.

Charles Rousseau's son Eric Rousseau is the current winemaker, with some input still from Charles as well as involvement on the commercial side from his daughters Corinne and Brigitte.

== Wines ==
Domaine Rousseau owns sections of and makes wines from many renowned Grand Cru and Premier Cru vineyards. All the wines are made entirely from the Pinot noir grape. The average production is 65,000 bottles per vintage and 90% of production is exported to over 30 countries worldwide.

Vineyard Name	Cru	Hectares	Notes
Chambertin	Grand Cru	2.55	
Clos de Bèze	Grand Cru	1.42	
Clos des Ruchottes	Grand Cru	1.06	A Monopole, forming one-third of Ruchottes-Chambertin
Mazis Chambertin	Grand Cru	0.53	
Charmes-Chambertin	Grand Cru	0.45	Blended together with Mazoyères-Chambertin and labeled Charmes-Chambertin.
Mazoyères-Chambertin	Grand Cru	0.92	Production blended with the Charmes-Chambertin and labeled as such.
Clos de la Roche	Grand Cru	1.48	
Clos St-Jacques	Premier Cru	2.21	
Cazetiers	Premier Cru	0.75	
Lavaux Saint-Jacques	Premier Cru	0.50	
Gevrey-Chambertin	Village	2.26	
