= Clos Saint-Jacques =

Clos Saint-Jacques is a Premier Cru vineyard used to produce red wine from Pinot noir grapes in the Côte de Nuits region of Burgundy. It is situated in the Gevrey-Chambertin Appellation d'origine contrôlée.

== History ==
The vineyard was named after a statue of Saint James that had been placed in the area, as it was a resting point on the way to Santiago de Compostela, the destination of the Way of St. James pilgrimage.

In the seventeenth century, ownership of the vineyard passed from the Cathedral Chapter of Saint-Mammes to the Morizot family. Throughout the 19th century, the vineyard was a Monopole of the Comte de Moucheron.

It was split up and sold in 1954 by the Comte de Moucheron to four producers. One of these producers was Henri Esmonin, who at the time of the sale was the metayage for the vineyard and bought 1.6 hectares. The other producers were Domaine Armand Rousseau who purchased 2.20 hectares, approximately 1 hectare was purchased by the Fourrier family and 2 hectares were purchased by Domaine Clair-Dau.

The bottom section of the vineyard was planted with alfalfa instead of grapes up until the sale in 1954. Vines were planted shortly afterward by the new owners.

== Status ==
Two authorities on Burgundy prior to the present day Institut National des Appellations d'Origine (INAO) official classification, Dr Jules Lavelle in 1855 and Camille Rodier in 1920, both rated Clos Saint-Jacques as the highest level of "1ère Cuvée".

A decision was made in the 1930s by the newly formed INAO that only vineyards directly touching the borders of the Chambertin and Clos de Beze vineyards would be eligible to be designated as Grand Cru in Gevrey-Chambertin, so Clos Saint-Jacque was given Premier Cru status.

Modern wine writers such as Clive Coates say that Clos Saint-Jacques "is clearly head and shoulders above all the other Gevrey premier crus" and "like Clos-Saint-Jacques in Gevrey Chambertin, is regarded by most - and priced accordingly - as the equal of a grand cru". Jancis Robinson says that Clos Saint Jacques is "always regarded as a Grand Cru in all but name".

== Production ==
The vineyard is 6.7 hectares in size and there are five strips, running from the top to the bottom of the vineyard, currently owned by five different producers. The largest holder is Domaine Armand Rousseau with the original 2.20 hectares purchased by the Domaine. Sylvie Esmonin, the granddaughter of Henri Esmonin, holds 1.60 hectares. Bruno Clair and Maison Louis Jadot own 1 hectare each, which was split between them from the land purchased by Domaine Clair-Dau. Domaine Fourrier holds 0.89 of a hectare that was originally purchased by the family.
