= Latricières-Chambertin =

Coordinates: 47°12′29″N 4°57′50″E

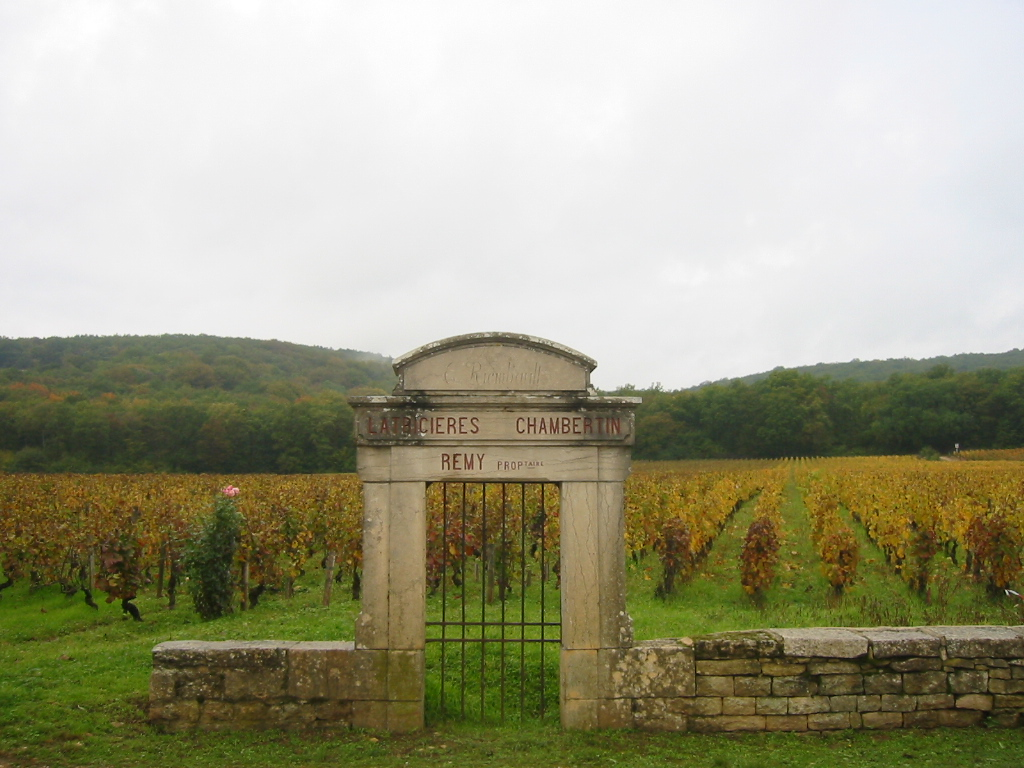
A vineyard gate in Latricières-Chambertin

Latricières-Chambertin is an Appellation d'origine contrôlée (AOC) and Grand Cru vineyard for red wine in the Côte de Nuits subregion of Burgundy, with Pinot noir as the main grape variety. Latricières-Chambertin is located within the commune of Gevrey-Chambertin. It is situated above (to the west of) the Route des Grands Crus. It borders on Chambertin in the north, Mazoyères-Chambertin in the east (across the road), and on Gevrey-Chambertin Premier Cru vineyard Aux Combottes in the south. The AOC was created in 1937.

== Production ==
In 2008, 7.05 hectares (17.4 acres) of vineyard surface was in production within the AOC, and 275 hectoliter of wine was produced, corresponding to about 37,000 bottles.

== AOC regulations ==
The main grape variety for Latricières-Chambertin is Pinot noir. The AOC regulations also allow up to 15 per cent total of Chardonnay, Pinot blanc and Pinot gris as accessory grapes, but this is practically never used for any Burgundy Grand Cru vineyard. The allowed base yield is 37 hectoliter per hectare, a minimum planting density of 9,000 vines per hectare and a minimum grape maturity of 11.5 per cent potential alcohol is required.

== See also ==
- List of Burgundy Grand Crus
- Chambertin
