= Griotte-Chambertin =

Coordinates: 47°12′51″N 4°58′04″E

Griotte-Chambertin is an Appellation d'origine contrôlée (AOC) and Grand Cru vineyard for red wine in the Côte de Nuits subregion of Burgundy, with Pinot noir as the main grape variety. Griotte-Chambertin is located within the commune of Gevrey-Chambertin. It is situated on the lower part of the hillside among the other "Chambertin", on the eastern (downhill) side of the Route des Grands Crus. It borders on Chapelle-Chambertin in the north, Charmes-Chambertin in the south, Chambertin itself in the west (across the road), and village-level Gevrey-Chambertin vineyards in the east.

The name of the vineyard derives from the grill pan shape that the rows of vines imitate. The AOC was created in 1937.

== Wine style ==
Wines from this vineyard are typically deep colored with soft fruitiness and velvet textures. The wines are expected to hit their peak in 10-20 years.

== Production ==
In 2008, 2.63 hectares (6.5 acres) of vineyard surface was in production within the AOC, and 105 hectoliter of wine was produced, corresponding to 14,000 bottles.

== AOC regulations ==
The main grape variety for Griotte-Chambertin is Pinot noir. The AOC regulations also allow up to 15 per cent total of Chardonnay, Pinot blanc and Pinot gris as accessory grapes, but this is practically never used for any Burgundy Grand Cru vineyard. The allowed base yield is 37 hectoliter per hectare, a minimum planting density of 9,000 vines per hectare and a minimum grape maturity of 11.5 per cent potential alcohol is required.

== See also ==
- List of Burgundy Grand Crus
