= Mazoyères-Chambertin =

Mazoyères-Chambertin is an Appellation d'origine contrôlée (AOC) and Grand Cru vineyard for red wine in the Côte de Nuits subregion of Burgundy, with Pinot noir as the main grape variety. Mazoyères-Chambertin is located within the commune of Gevrey-Chambertin. It is situated below (to the east of) the Route des Grands Crus. It borders on Latricières-Chambertin and the Gevrey-Chambertin Premier Cru aux Combottes in the west, Charmes-Chambertin in the north, Gevrey-Chambertin village level vineyards in the east, and Morey-Saint-Denis Premier Cru vineyards in the south. The AOC was created in 1937.

A peculiarity of Mazoyères-Chambertin is that the appellations Charmes-Chambertin (of the neighbouring Grand Cru vineyard) may be used interchangeably with that of Mazoyères-Chambertin. As Charmes-Chambertin is the more popular to use, relatively little wine is bottled as Mazoyères-Chambertin, which is only around 10 per cent of the production.

Another grand cru vineyard in Gevrey Chambertin with a similar name, but no other connection is Mazis-Chambertin which is also known as Mazy-Chambertin.

== Production ==
In 2008, 1.72 hectares (4.3 acres) of vineyard surface was in production for Mazoyères-Chambertin AOC, and 65 hectoliter of wine was produced under the Mazoyères-Chambertin designation, corresponding to slightly less than 9,000 bottles. At the same time, 28.97 hectares (71.6 acres) of vineyard surface was in production for Charmes-Chambertin, around half of which actually originates in the Mazoyères-Chambertin vineyard.

== AOC regulations ==
The main grape variety for Mazoyères-Chambertin is Pinot noir. The AOC regulations also allow up to 15 per cent total of Chardonnay, Pinot blanc and Pinot gris as accessory grapes, but this is practically never used for any Burgundy Grand Cru vineyard. The allowed base yield is 37 hectoliter per hectare, a minimum planting density of 9,000 vines per hectare is required as well as a minimum grape maturity of 11.5 per cent potential alcohol.

== See also ==
- List of Burgundy Grand Crus
- Chambertin
