= Mazis-Chambertin =

French wine

Coordinates: 47°13′13″N 4°58′04″E

Mazis-Chambertin, sometimes written Mazy-Chambertin is an Appellation d'origine contrôlée (AOC) and Grand Cru vineyard for red wine in the Côte de Nuits subregion of Burgundy, with Pinot noir as the main grape variety. Mazis-Chambertin is located within the commune of Gevrey-Chambertin. It is situated above (to the west of) the Route des Grands Crus. It borders on Chambertin-Clos de Bèze in the south, Ruchottes-Chambertin in the west, and on Gevrey-Chambertin Premier Cru vineyards in the north and east. Among the various "Chambertin" vineyards, it is the one situated closer to the town of Gevrey-Chambertin itself. The AOC was created in 1937, and should not be confused with the entirely separate Mazoyères-Chambertin.

== Production ==
In 2008, 8.79 hectares (21.7 acres) of vineyard surface was in production within the AOC, and 274 hectoliter of wine was produced, corresponding to somewhat over 36,000 bottles.

== AOC regulations ==
The main grape variety for Mazis-Chambertin is pinot noir. The AOC regulations also allow up to 15 per cent total of Chardonnay, Pinot blanc and Pinot gris as accessory grapes, but this is practically never used for any Burgundy Grand Cru vineyard. The allowed base yield is 37 hectoliter per hectare, a minimum planting density of 9,000 vines per hectare is required as well as a minimum grape maturity of 11.5 per cent potential alcohol.

== See also ==
- List of Burgundy Grand Crus
- Chambertin
