= Charmes-Chambertin =

Grand cru vineyard in the department of Côte-d'Or

Coordinates: 47°12′40″N 4°58′03″E

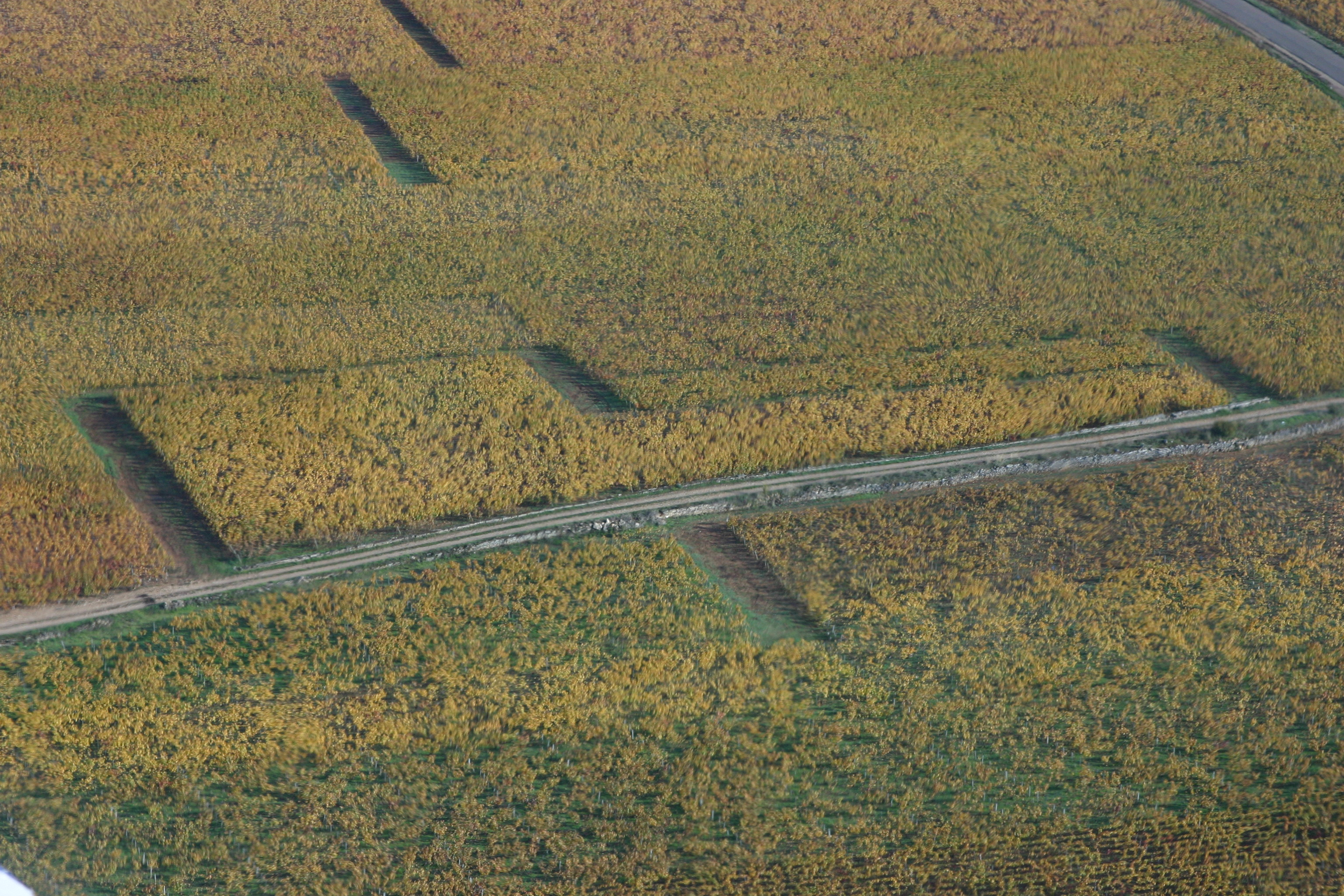
Domaine Jacques Prieur vineyards in Charmes Chambertin

Charmes-Chambertin is an Appellation d'origine contrôlée (AOC) and Grand Cru vineyard for in the Côte de Nuits subregion of Burgundy. It specializes in red wine, with Pinot noir as the main grape variety. It is located in the southern part of the commune of Gevrey-Chambertin and on the lower hillside east of Chambertin (on the other side of the Route des Grands Crus), north of Mazoyères-Chambertin and south of Griotte-Chambertin. The AOC was created in 1937.

== Wine style ==
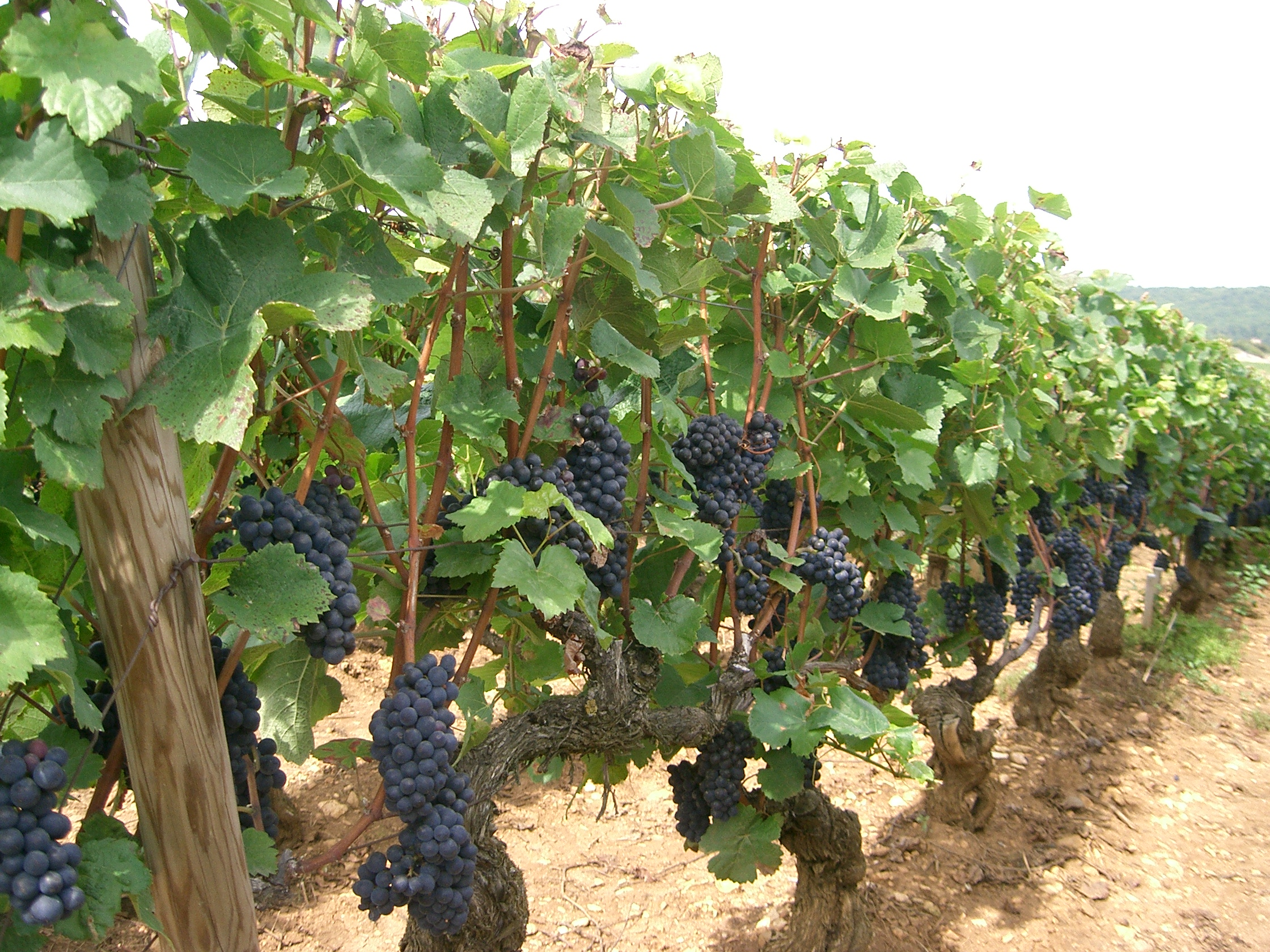
Pinot noir grapes.

Wines from Charmes-Chambertin are known for being highly fragrant in their youth, and known for the typicity character of the Pinot noir and its soft, ripe fruit flavors that typically peak between 10-20 years. The section of the vineyard closest to the Route N74 road is often considered closer to premier cru than Grand cru status.

== Production ==
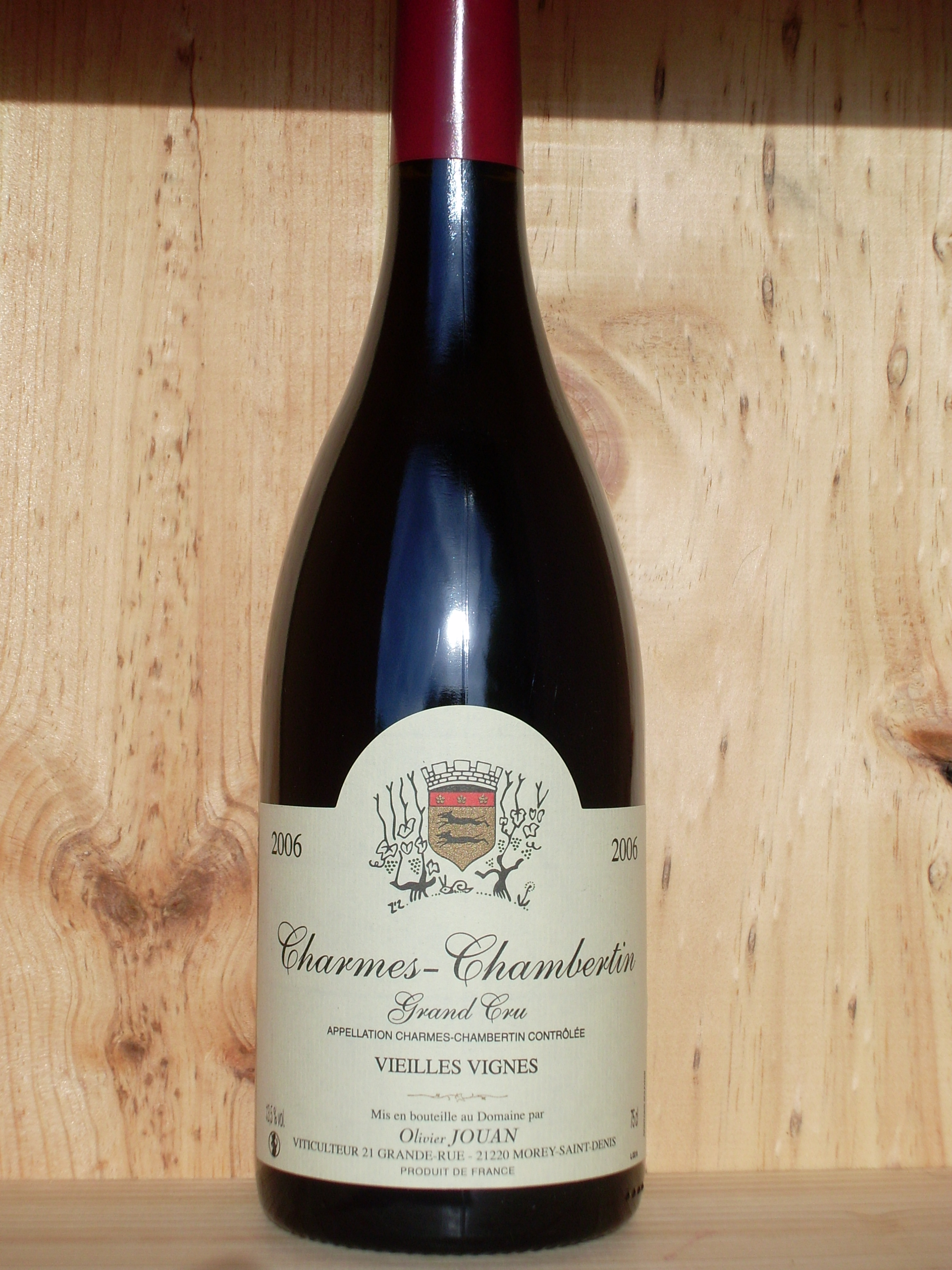
A Charmes-Chambertain from Domaine Jouan Olivier

In 2008, 28.97 hectares (71.6 acres) of vineyard surface was in production within the AOC, which made it the largest Grand Cru in Gevrey-Chambertin. 1,115 hectolitres (24,500 imp gal) of wine was produced, corresponding to just under 150,000 bottles.

== AOC regulations ==
The main grape variety for Charmes-Chambertin is Pinot noir. The AOC regulations also allow up to 15 per cent total of Chardonnay, Pinot blanc and Pinot gris as accessory grapes, but this is practically never used for any Burgundy Grand Cru vineyard. The allowed base yield is 37 hectoliter per hectare, a minimum planting density of 9,000 vines per hectare and a minimum grape maturity of 11.5 per cent potential alcohol is required.

Mazoyères-Chambertin, which adjoins Charmes-Chambertin to the south, is generally (and legally) bottled under the Charmes-Chambertin appellation.

== See also ==
- List of Burgundy Grand Crus
