= Domaine Jacques Prieur =

Domaine Jacques Prieur is a wine grower-producer in Burgundy, France, located in Meursault. The domaine produces wines from both Côte de Beaune and Côte de Nuits.

Its Montrachet competed in the Grand European Jury Wine Tasting of 1997.

== See also ==
- French wine
- Burgundy wine
