= Chambertin =

Vineyard in Burgundy, France

Coordinates: 47°12′41″N 4°57′53″E

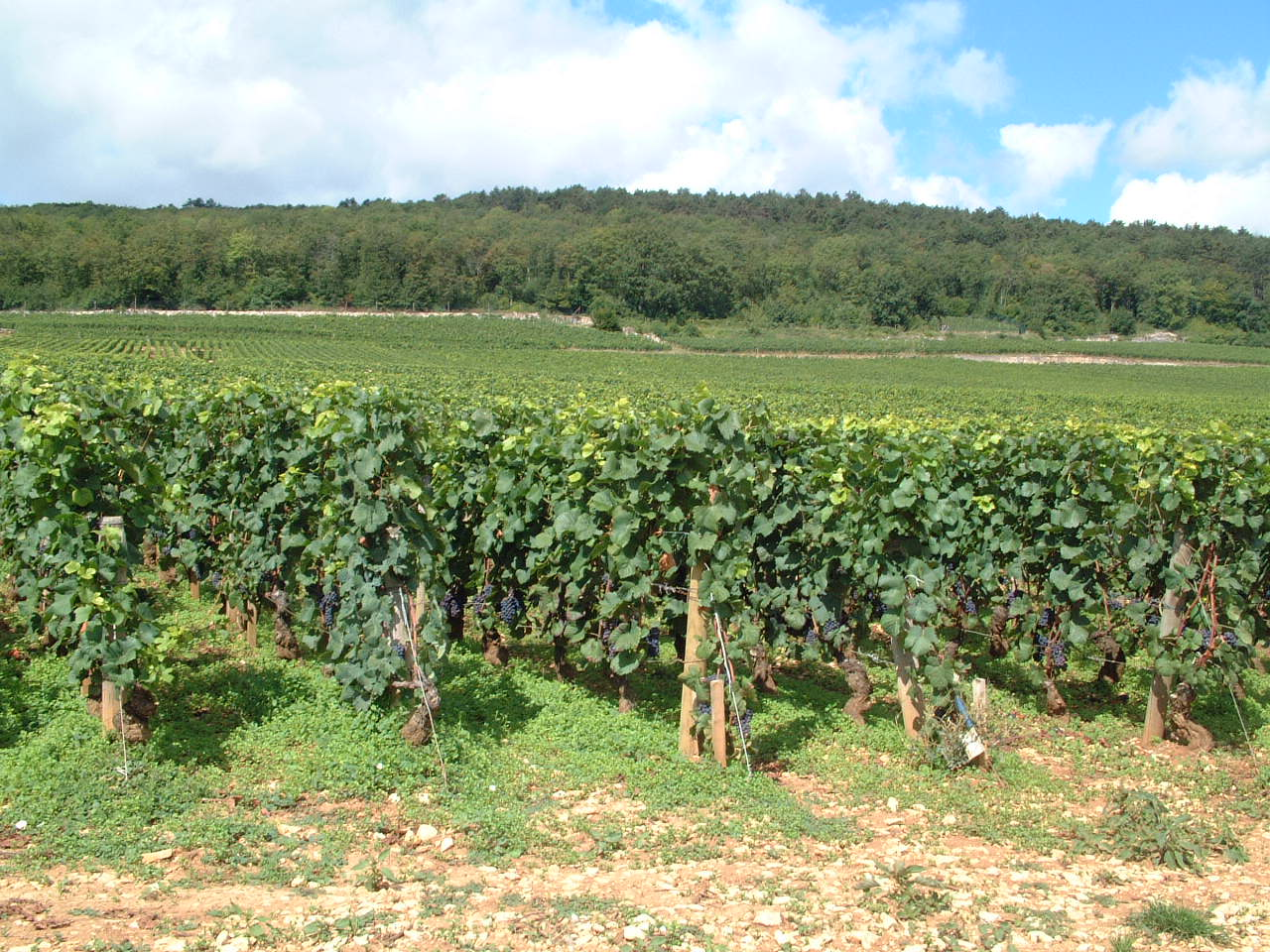
The Chambertin vineyard.

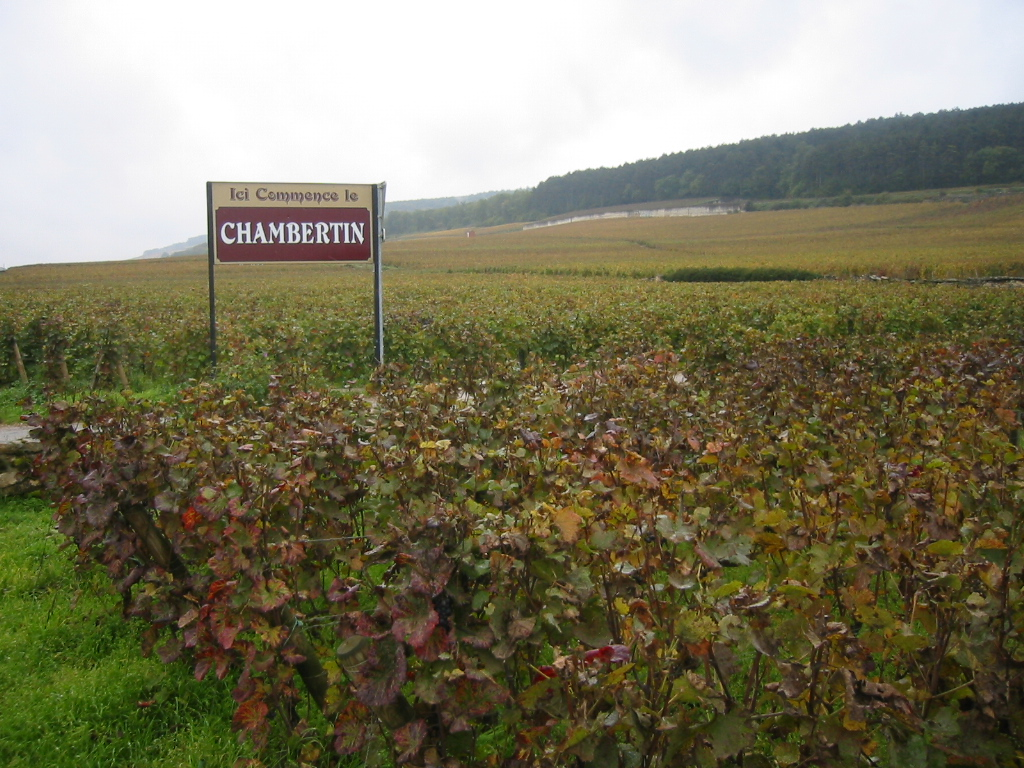
Sign announcing the beginning of the Chambertin vineyard.

Chambertin is an Appellation d'origine contrôlée (AOC) and Grand Cru vineyard for red wine in the Côte de Nuits subregion of Burgundy, with Pinot noir as the main grape variety. Chambertin is located within the commune of Gevrey-Chambertin, and it is situated approximately in the centre of a group of nine Grand Cru vineyards all having "Chambertin" as part of their name. The other eight vineyards, which all are separate AOCs, have hyphenated names where Chambertin appears with a prefix, such as Chapelle-Chambertin. Chambertin itself is situated above (to the west of) the Route des Grands Crus. It borders on Chambertin-Clos de Bèze in the north, Griotte-Chambertin and Charmes-Chambertin in the east (across the road) and the Latricières-Chambertin in the south. The AOC was created in 1937.

Of the surrounding vineyards, wines from Chambertin-Clos de Bèze may also be sold under the Chambertin AOC. However, Chambertin-Clos de Bèze has a very good reputation on its own, so this is not widely practiced. The other seven "hyphenated Chambertin" Grand Cru vineyards do not have this right to use the Chambertin AOC.

== Wine style ==
As with most of Burgundy's vineyards, both Chambertin and Clos de Bèze have had numerous owners, twenty-three and eighteen respectively. Unfortunately, quality varies from producer to producer and, although Chambertin has been called "King of Wines," less accomplished winemakers do not always produce wines that fully live up to that reputation. The quality of wines from Clos de Bèze is considered higher and more consistent than those from Chambertin. The best wines from these two vineyards are quite powerful. They have concentrated fruit flavors, intense, rich, perfumed aromas, and long aging capabilities.

== History ==
The Clos de Bèze vineyard was initially cleared and planted back in the 7th century by monks from the Abbey of Bèze, which owned the land. Legend has it that it was not until the 12th century that Chambertin itself was planted by a Monsieur Bertin, who felt that he could also make good wines if he grew the same grape varieties as his famous next-door neighbor. His vineyard was called Champ de Bertin ("Bertin's field") and later shortened to Chambertin.

In 1702, Claude Jobert acquired both vineyards uniting both Chambertin and Clos de Bèze.

The Chambertin wines were one of Napoleon's favorites and it is said that he insisted that they be available to him even during his various military campaigns. According to Hazlitt, Chambertin was the only wine Napoleon drank during his reign as Emperor, "and he seldom drank it pure."

Chambertin is the brief focus of a joke featured in the 1951 film Love Nest which costarred Marilyn Monroe in a supporting lead, though she is not present in the scene where the vintage is explicitly mentioned. The scene is set in a nightclub restaurant where "elderly Casanova" Charley Patterson (Frank Fay) is once again attempting to swindle money from one of the many widowed dowagers he regularly courts. After they place their orders the waiter asks the couple if they would care for champagne with their dinner to which Charley declares nonchalantly; "Champagne is for peasants". The waiter then suggests Chambertin and adds that Charley has "excellent taste." Charley's date, oblivious and entranced, remarks that she does "admire a man who knows how to order..."

== Production ==
In 2008, 13.22 hectares (32.7 acres) of vineyard surface was in production for Chambertin AOC, and 437 hectoliter of wine was produced under the Chambertin designation, corresponding to slightly less than 60,000 bottles.

== AOC regulations ==
The main grape variety for Chambertin is Pinot noir. The AOC regulations also allow up to 15 per cent total of Chardonnay, Pinot blanc and Pinot gris as accessory grapes, but this is practically never used for any Burgundy Grand Cru vineyard. The allowed base yield is 35 hectoliter per hectare, a minimum planting density of 9,000 vines per hectare is required as well as a minimum grape maturity of 11.5 per cent potential alcohol.

== Producers ==
Of the producers in Chambertin, the wines of Domaine Armand Rousseau generally command the highest prices. Rousseau owns 2.15 hectares (5.3 acres) in Chambertin, as well as a total of 4.38 hectares (10.8 acres) in four of the other "Chambertin" Grands Crus.

Other vineyard owners with more than 1 hectare (2.5 acres) in Chambertin are Domaine Jean-Louis Trapet, Domaine Rossignol-Trapet and Camus Père et Fils. Between 0.5 hectares (1.2 acres) and 1 ha each is held by Louis Latour, Domaine Jacques Prieur and Domaine Leroy.

== Overview of the "Chambertin" vineyards ==
Together, the nine "Chambertin" Grand Cru vineyards of Gevrey-Chambertin form a continuous area which roughly forms a rectangle 2 kilometres (1.2 mi) by 500 metres (1,600 ft) in size, situated just south of the town of Gevrey-Chambertin itself. In three of the vineyards, the producers are free to choose between two Grand Cru appellations.

Grand Cru	Relative position	May also be called	Vineyard surface (2007)	Average annual production (2003–2007)
Chambertin	West (Southwest)		15 hectares (37 acres)	454 hl
Chambertin-Clos de Bèze	West (Northwest)	Chambertin	14.40 hectares (35.6 acres)	444 hl
Charmes-Chambertin	East (Southeast)	(Mazoyères-Chambertin)	29.57 hectares (73.1 acres)	1,112 hl
Mazoyères-Chambertin	Southeast	Charmes-Chambertin	1.83 hectares (4.5 acres)	67 hl
Chapelle-Chambertin	Northeast		5.49 hectares (13.6 acres)	159 hl
Griotte-Chambertin	East		2.71 hectares (6.7 acres)	92 hl
Latricières-Chambertin	Southwest		7.05 hectares (17.4 acres)	308 hl
Mazis-Chambertin	North		9.27 hectares (22.9 acres)	322 hl
Ruchottes-Chambertin	Northwest		3.07 hectares (7.6 acres)	102 hl

In general, Chambertin and Chambertin-Clos de Bèze are seen as one notch above the other seven Grands Crus in quality. This is also reflected in a small difference in the allowed yield, where Chambertin and Chambertin-Clos de Bèze are restricted to a base yield of 35 hl/ha, while the other seven are allowed 37 hl/ha.

== See also ==
- List of Burgundy Grand Crus
