= Gevrey-Chambertin =

- Commune
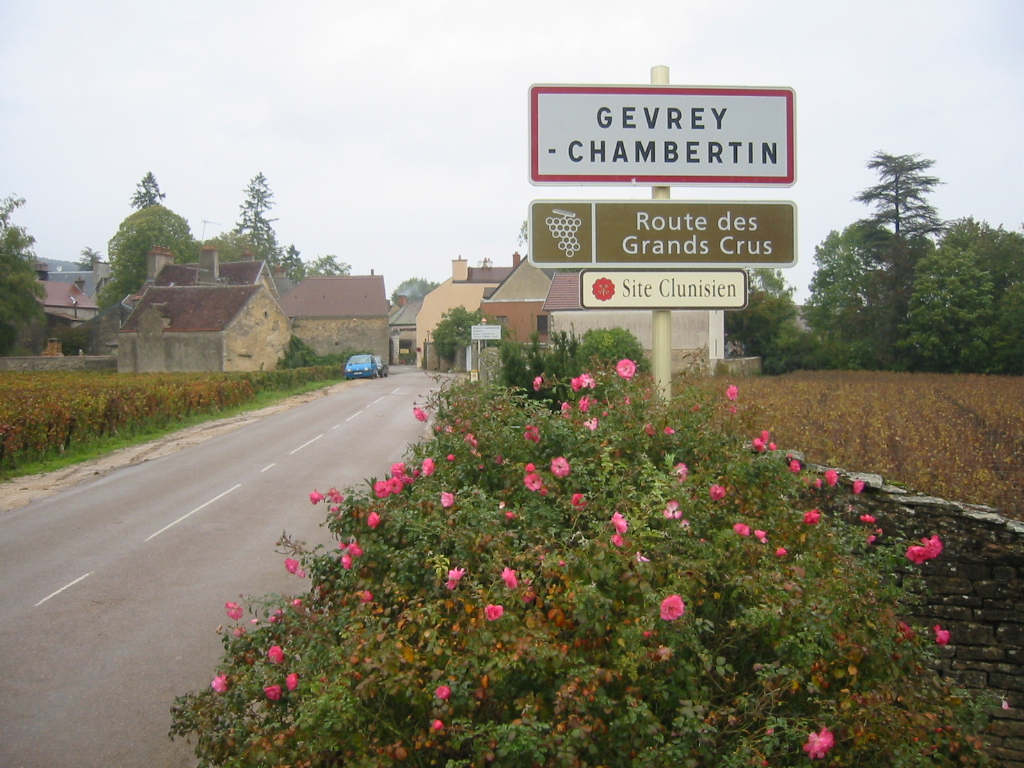
- The road into Gevrey-Chambertin

- Coat of arms
- Location of Gevrey-Chambertin
- Location within France Location within Bourgogne-Franche-Comté
- Coordinates: 47°13′38″N 4°58′05″E
- Country: France
- Region: Bourgogne-Franche-Comté
- Department: Côte-d'Or
- Arrondissement: Beaune
- Canton: Longvic
- Intercommunality: Gevrey-Chambertin et Nuits-Saint-Georges

Government
  - Mayor (2020–2026): Christophe Lucand
- Area^{1}: 24.77 km^{2} (9.56 sq mi)
- Elevation: 287 m (942 ft)
- Highest elevation: 510 m (1,670 ft)
- Lowest elevation: 212 m (696 ft)
- Population (2023): 2,917
  - Density: 117.8/km^{2} (305.0/sq mi)
- Time zone: UTC+01:00 (CET)
  - Summer (DST): UTC+02:00 (CEST)
- INSEE/Postal code: 21295 /21220
- ^{1} French Land Register data, which excludes lakes, ponds, glaciers > 1 km^{2} (0.386 sq mi or 247 acres) and river estuaries.

Gevrey-Chambertin (French pronunciation: [ʒəvʁɛ ʃɑ̃bɛʁtɛ̃]) is a commune in the Côte-d'Or department of France in the Bourgogne-Franche-Comté region in eastern France.

It lies 15 kilometres (9.3 mi) south of Dijon. This touristy, winemaking village is situated on the Route des Grands Crus in the Côte de Nuits. The village is noted for the Grand cru Burgundy wine that is produced from its vineyards, the most famous of which is Chambertin.

== Geography ==
Gevrey-Chambertin is one of the wine villages of the Côte de Nuits which lies along the foot of the Côte-d'Or escarpment, to the south of Dijon and with the broad Saône valley plain to its east. It produces red Burgundy wine from vineyards at the village, Premier Cru and Grand Cru level.

The vineyards on the slope of the Côte d'Or form a strip below and east of the woodland on the Jurassic limestone hills. In the plain of the Saône to the east, there are large fields. The commune is also traversed by the A31 road and the railway from Dijon to the south with a large marshalling yard (Gevrey-Triage). There is also a stretch of Roman road from Dijon to the southern end of the Forest of Cîteaux, to the south of the abbey.

== Population ==
Historical population
Year	Pop.	±% p.a.
1968	2,613	—
1975	3,001	+2.00%
1982	2,582	−2.13%
1990	2,825	+1.13%
1999	3,258	+1.60%
2007	3,120	−0.54%
2012	3,070	−0.32%
2017	3,087	+0.11%
2023	2,917	−0.94%
Source: INSEE

== History ==
=== Origins ===
As in the Île de France and the South of France, vines in Burgundy were planted very early on. Only in Gevrey-Chambertin, however, have archaeological digs been able to find Gallo-Roman vines dating back to the 1st Century BC. The outline of 120 vine stocks was discovered in 2008, during the expansion of a residential development that was updating 300 septic tanks all lined up in an area of 6 km^{2}. This archaeological discovery corroborates with texts written by Pliny the Elder and Columella, making it credible that the Gallo-Roman vines in Gevrey-Chambertin were the first vines to be planted in Bourgogne. The vines were planted in rows, just as they would be today, but the choice of land used and its exposure were quite different: the Gallo-Roman vines were planted on plains, as opposed to the terraces that most of today's Côtes de Nuits is grown on. Furthermore, wines made from these vines would have had a different taste, notably because the Gallo-Romans added spices as preservatives.

== Administration ==
List of mayors
Period	Name	Party
1977–2014	Jean-Claude Robert	Socialist Party
2014–2020	Bernard Moyne	Socialist Party
2020–2026	Christophe Lucand	Socialist Party

== Winemaking ==
The Gevrey-Chambertin winemaking area on the Route des Grands Crus of Côte de Nuits is one of the most well known areas in the wine region of Burgundy. 310 hectares (770 acres) of vineyards planted to Pinot noir grapes are used to produce the village's red wine.

Gevrey-Chambertin is the source of 9 out of 33 Burgundy Grand crus AOC wines: Chambertin 12.9 ha, Chambertin-Clos-de-Bèze 15.4 ha, Chapelle-Chambertin 5.5 ha, Charmes-Chambertin 30.8 ha, Mazis-Chambertin 9.1 ha, Mazoyères-Chambertin 1.72 ha, Griotte-Chambertin 2.7 ha, Latricières-Chambertin 7.3 ha, Ruchottes-Chambertin 3.3 ha. Gevrey-Chambertin wines have high ageing potential (10 to 20 years, longer for some exceptions).

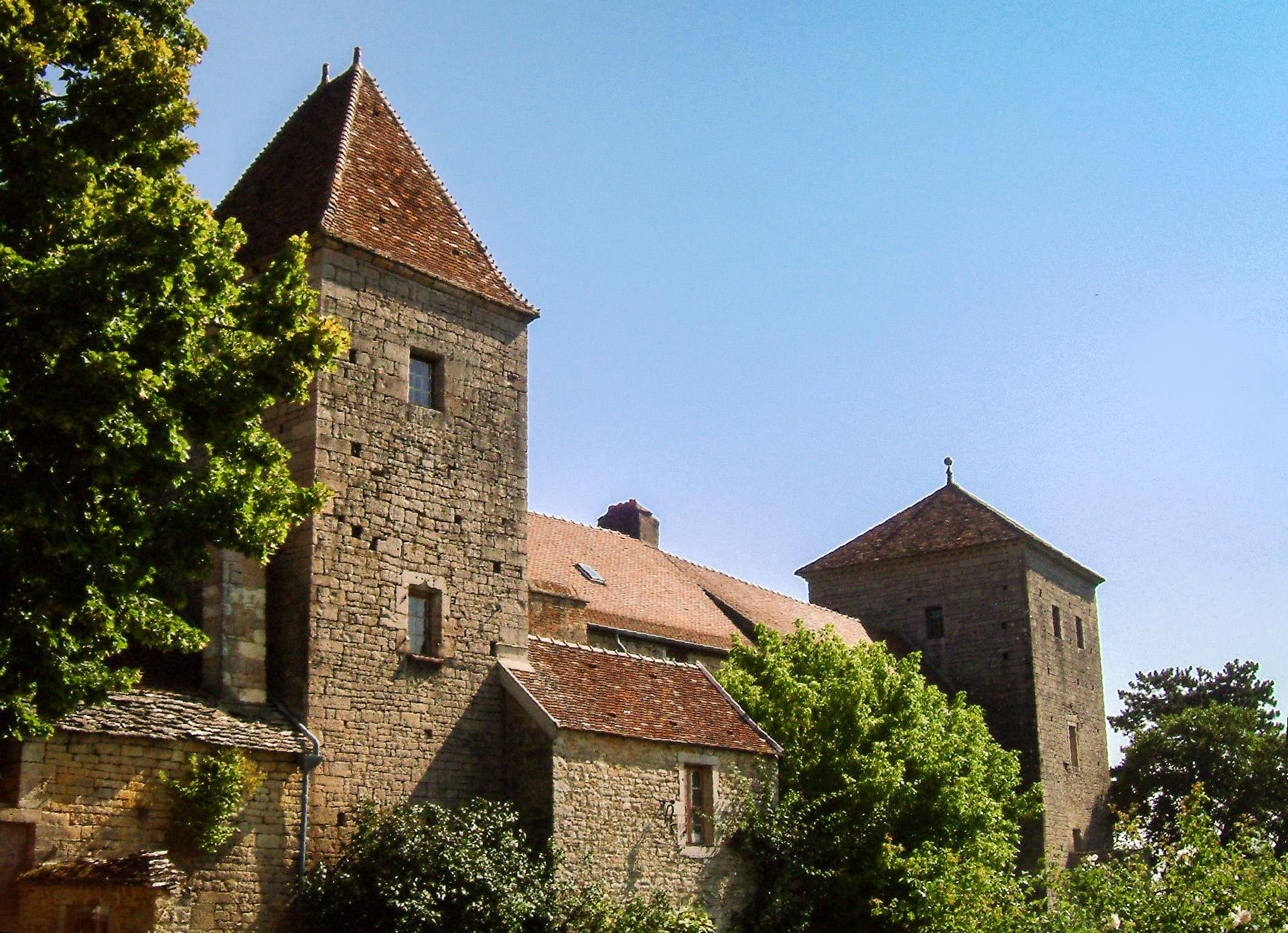
Château de Gevrey-Chambertin

== Sights ==
- Route des Grands Crus
- Château de Gevrey-Chambertin
- The Combe de Lavaux (Nature Reserve)
- The classification yard of Dijon's railway hub
- The Chambertin vineyard.

== Notable people ==
- Maurice Boitel, 20th century French painter
- André Pichot (1950–2025), historian of science
- Gaston Roupnel, 20th century regionalist writer
- Alphonse de Lamartine, 19th century French poet and politician
- Jacques-Théodore Saconney, 20th century senior French army general, innovative scientific and adventurous balloonist (related to Gaston Roupnel)

== International relations ==
The commune is twinned with Nierstein in the Rheinhessen wine region of Germany, and with the Belgian town Spy in the Namur province. The Albasso choir received the Sarteline choir of Sart-Bernard, Namur, from 24 to 25 March 2007. In its turn, the Gevrey-Chambertin choir went to Belgium from 1 to 2 March 2009. A return visit of the Belgian choir to the commune is currently being discussed.

== Gallery ==
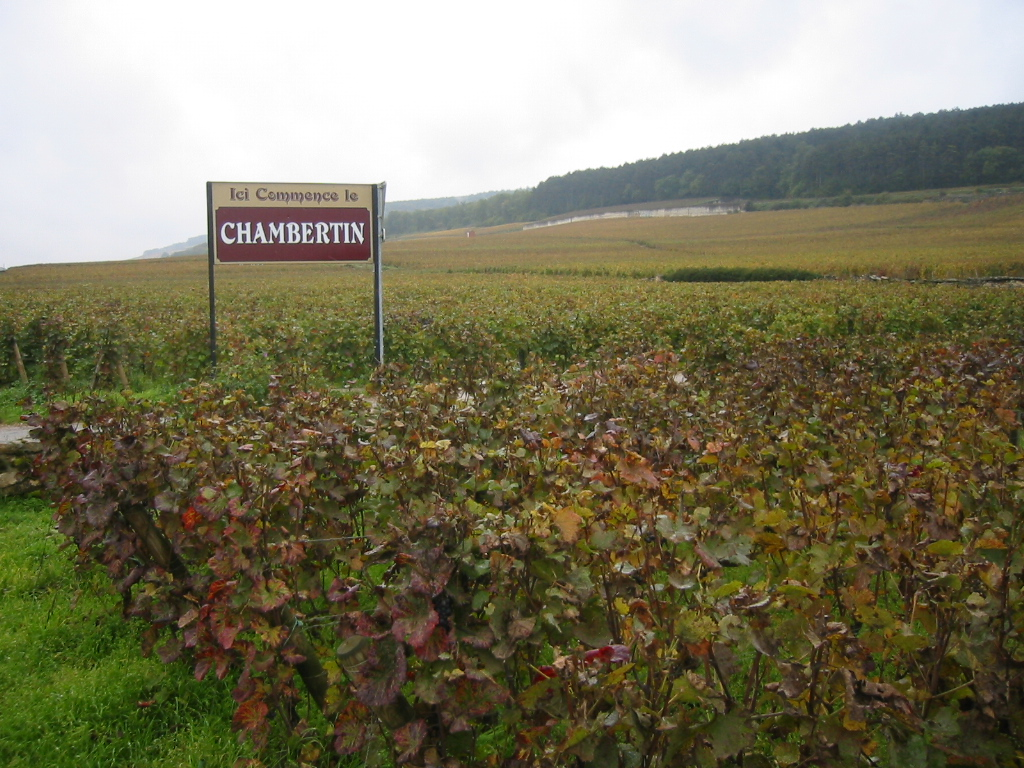

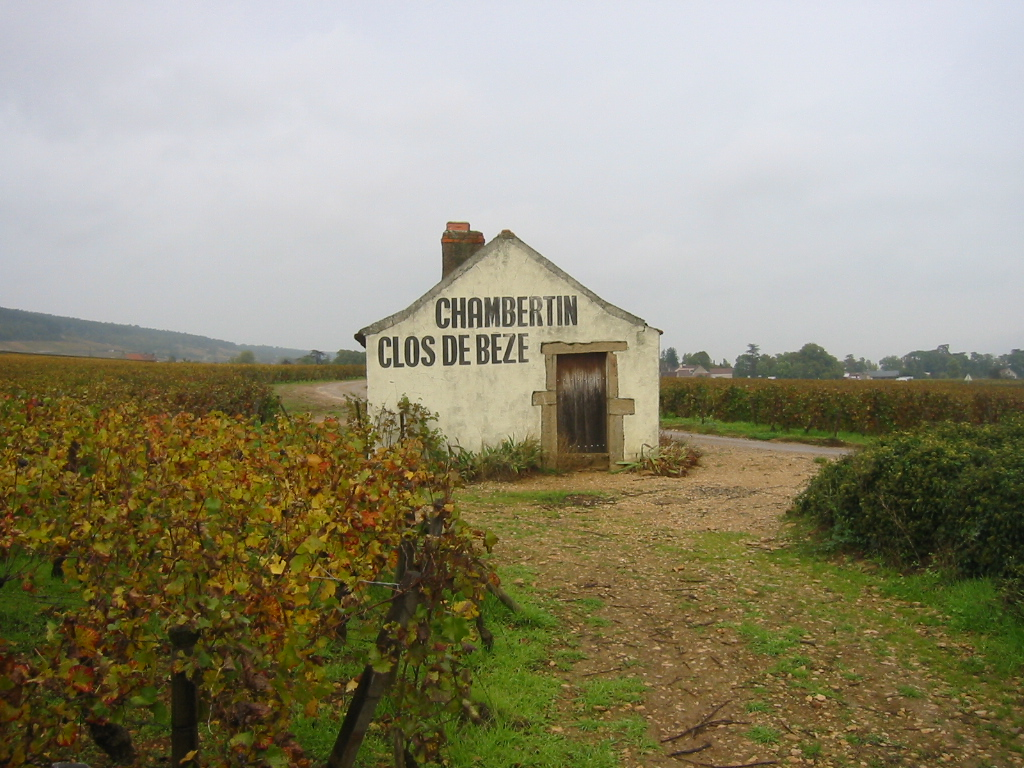

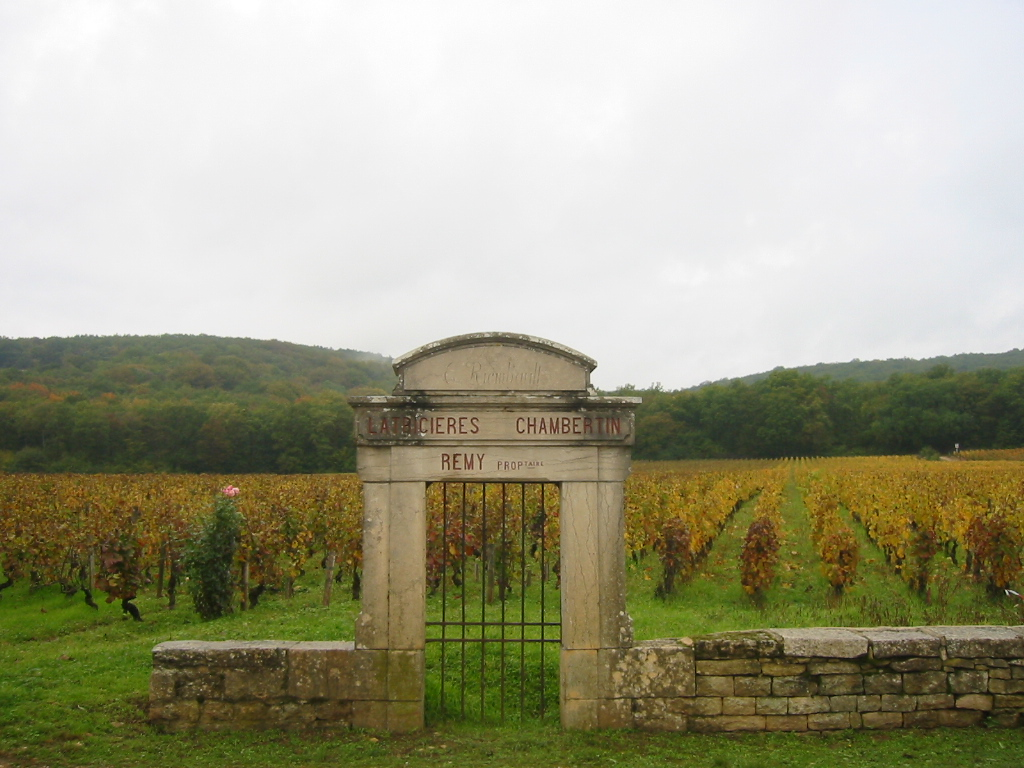

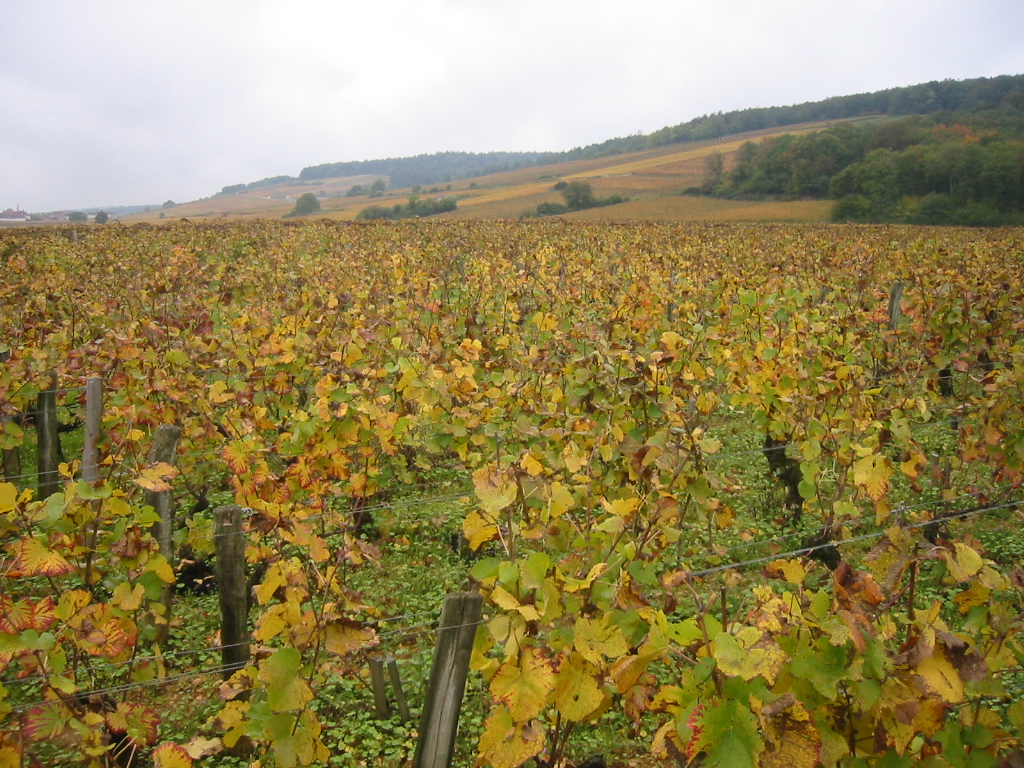

== See also ==
- Communes of the Côte-d'Or département
- Chambertin
- Route des Grands Crus
- Château de Gevrey-Chambertin
