= Ruchottes-Chambertin =

Coordinates: 47°13′15″N 4°57′53″E

- Wine region
- Type: AOC
- Country: France

Ruchottes-Chambertin is an Appellation d'origine contrôlée (AOC) and Grand Cru vineyard for red wine in the Côte de Nuits subregion of Burgundy, with Pinot noir as the main grape variety. Ruchottes-Chambertin is located within the commune of Gevrey-Chambertin. It is situated high up on the Côte d'Or slope, above (to the west of) Mazis-Chambertin, and also borders on Gevrey-Chambertin Premier Cru vineyards in the north and south. The AOC was created in 1937.

== Production ==
In 2008, 3 hectares (7.4 acres) of vineyard surface was in production within the AOC, and 98 hectoliter of wine was produced, corresponding to just over 13,000 bottles.

== AOC regulations ==
The main grape variety for Ruchottes-Chambertin is Pinot noir. The AOC regulations also allow up to 15 per cent total of Chardonnay, Pinot blanc and Pinot gris as accessory grapes, but this is practically never used for any Burgundy Grand Cru vineyard. The allowed base yield is 37 hectoliter per hectare, a minimum planting density of 9,000 vines per hectare is required as well as a minimum grape maturity of 11.5 per cent potential alcohol.

== See also ==
- List of Burgundy Grand Crus
- Chambertin
