= Chambertin-Clos de Bèze =

Coordinates: 47°12′59″N 4°57′57″E

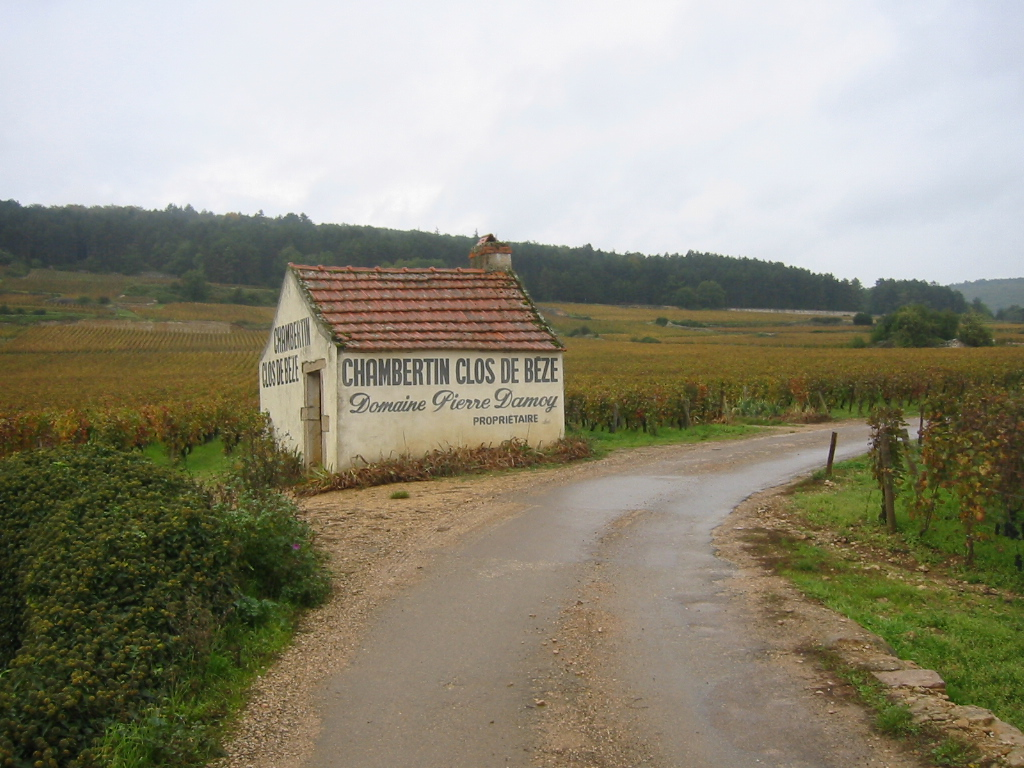

Chambertin-Clos de Bèze is an Appellation d'origine contrôlée (AOC) and Grand Cru vineyard for red wine in the Côte de Nuits subregion of Burgundy, with Pinot noir as the main grape variety. Chambertin-Clos de Bèze is located within the commune of Gevrey-Chambertin, together with a group of nine Grand Cru vineyards all having "Chambertin" as part of their name. It is located uphill from (to the west of) the Route des Grands Crus, borders on Chambertin in the north, Griotte-Chambertin and Chapelle-Chambertin in the east (across the road) and Mazis-Chambertin in the north. The AOC was created in 1937.

Under AOC regulations some wine from Chambertin-Clos de Bèze may be labeled as just Chambertin. Since Chambertin-Clos de Bèze has a good reputation on its own, this is not widely practiced.

== Wine style ==
As with most of Burgundy's vineyards, both Chambertin and Clos de Bèze have had numerous owners, twenty-three and eighteen respectively. Unfortunately, quality varies from producer to producer and, although Chambertin has been called "King of Wines", less accomplished winemakers do not always produce wines that fully live up to that reputation. The quality of wines from Clos de Bèze is considered higher and more consistent than those from Chambertin. The best wines from these two vineyards are quite powerful. They have concentrated fruit flavors, intense, rich, perfumed aromas, and long aging capabilities.

The slight difference between the two derives from the deeper sub-soil of Chambertin which makes those wines a little more brawny with slightly higher alcohol and tannin content than wines from the Clos de Bèze. From this grand cru the wines are expected to have some finesse to compensate for it relatively low body and be able to reach its peak between 12 and 30 years.

In general, Chambertin and Chambertin-Clos de Bèze are seen as one notch in quality above the other seven Grands Crus with "Chambertin" as part of their name. This is also reflected in a small difference in the allowed yield, where Chambertin and Chambertin-Clos de Bèze are restricted to a base yield of 35 hl/ha, while the other seven are allowed 37 hl/ha.

== History ==
Around A.D.630, Algamaire, the Duke of Southern Burgundy, endowed the Abbey of Beze with some land in Gevrey in which the Cistercian nuns of Notre Dame de Tart first cultivated the land into a vineyard. Six centuries later, the field next to the abbey was bought by a peasant named Bertin and was called the Champs de Bertin, or "Bertin’s field". Bertin also planted vines on his field, and the name was soon shortened to Chambertin. In 1702 vigneron Claude Jobert acquired both vineyards uniting both Chambertin and Clos de Beze.

== Production ==
In 2008, 14.67 hectares (36.3 acres) of vineyard surface was in production for Chambertin AOC, and 508 hectoliter of wine was produced under the Chambertin designation, corresponding to slightly under 68,000 bottles.

== AOC regulations ==
The main grape variety for Chambertin-Clos de Bèze is Pinot noir. The AOC regulations also allow up to 15 per cent total of Chardonnay, Pinot blanc and Pinot gris as accessory grapes, but this is practically never used for any Burgundy Grand Cru vineyard. The allowed base yield is 42 hectoliters per hectare, a minimum planting density of 9,000 vines per hectare is required as well as a minimum grape maturity of 11.5 per cent potential alcohol.

== See also ==
- List of Burgundy Grand Crus
