= André Pichot =

French historian of science (1950–2025)

André Maurice Louis Pichot (15 September 1950 in Gevrey-Chambertin – 2 February 2025 in Strasbourg) was a French researcher and historian of science at the French National Centre for Scientific Research.

Pichot was a researcher in Epistemology and History of Science, based at CNRS in Strasbourg. He was a pupil of Georges Canguilhem. He is known in France for his critical writings on issues related to genetics, in particular the influence modern biology has had on ideologies supporting eugenics.

He was the author of Pure Society: From Darwin to Hitler, a book about the history of eugenics.

== Bibliography ==
=== Books ===
- Éléments pour une théorie de la biologie, éd. Maloine, 1980.
- La naissance de la science, Tome I. Mésopotamie, égypte, Tome II. Grèce présocratique, éd. Gallimard, coll. Folio/Essai n°154 et 155, 1991.
- Petite phénoménologie de la connaissance, éd. Aubier, 1991.
- Histoire de la notion de vie, éd. Gallimard, coll. TEL, 1993.
- L’eugénisme, ou les généticiens saisis par la philanthropie, éd. Hatier, coll. Optiques, 1995.
- Histoire de la notion de gène, éd. Flammarion, coll. Champs, 1999.
- La société pure : de Darwin à Hitler, éd. Flammarion, 2000 (coll. Champ, 2001). Translated in English as The Pure Society - from Darwin to Hitler, Verso Books, 2009.

=== Scientific articles ===
- The strange object of biology, article de la revue Fundamenta Scientae, vol.8, n°1, 1987.
- De la "natura medicatrix" à l’organisme en panne, article de la revue La Recherche n°281, supp. "La santé et ses métamorphoses", novembre 1995.
- Sur la notion de programme génétique, article de la revue Philosophia Scientae, vol.6, n°1, 2002.

=== Articles for the press ===
- Hérédité et évolution (l’inné et l’acquis en biologie), article de la revue Esprit juin 1996.
- Racisme et biologie, article du journal Le Monde du 4 octobre 1996.
- Des biologistes et des races, article de la revue La Recherche n° 295, février 1997.
- Dolly la clonesse, ou les dangers de l'insignifiance, article du journal Le Monde du 5 mars 1997.
- Darwinisme, altruisme et radotage, article du journal Le Monde du 3 juillet 1998.
- Petites devinettes pour Fukuyama, article du journal Le Monde du 22 juin 1999.
- La génétique est une science sans objet, article de la revue Esprit, mai 2001.
- Clonage : Frankenstein ou Pieds-Nickelés ?, article du journal Le Monde du 30 novembre 2001.
- Qui se souvient de M. J. ?, article du journal Le Monde du 28 décembre 2002.
- Mémoire pour rectifier les jugements du public sur la révolution biologique, article de la revue Esprit, aout-septembre 2003.
