= Gevrey-Chambertin wine =

Wine

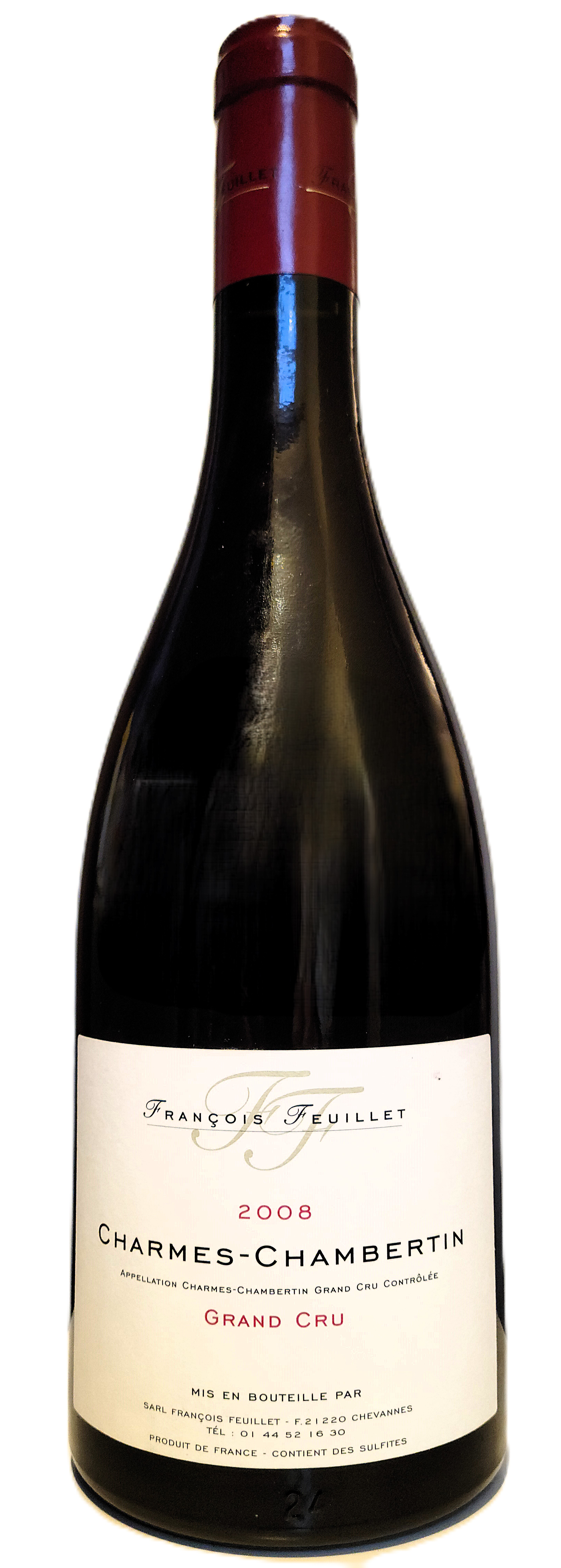
Francois Feuilletru Charmes-Chambertin Grand Cru 2008

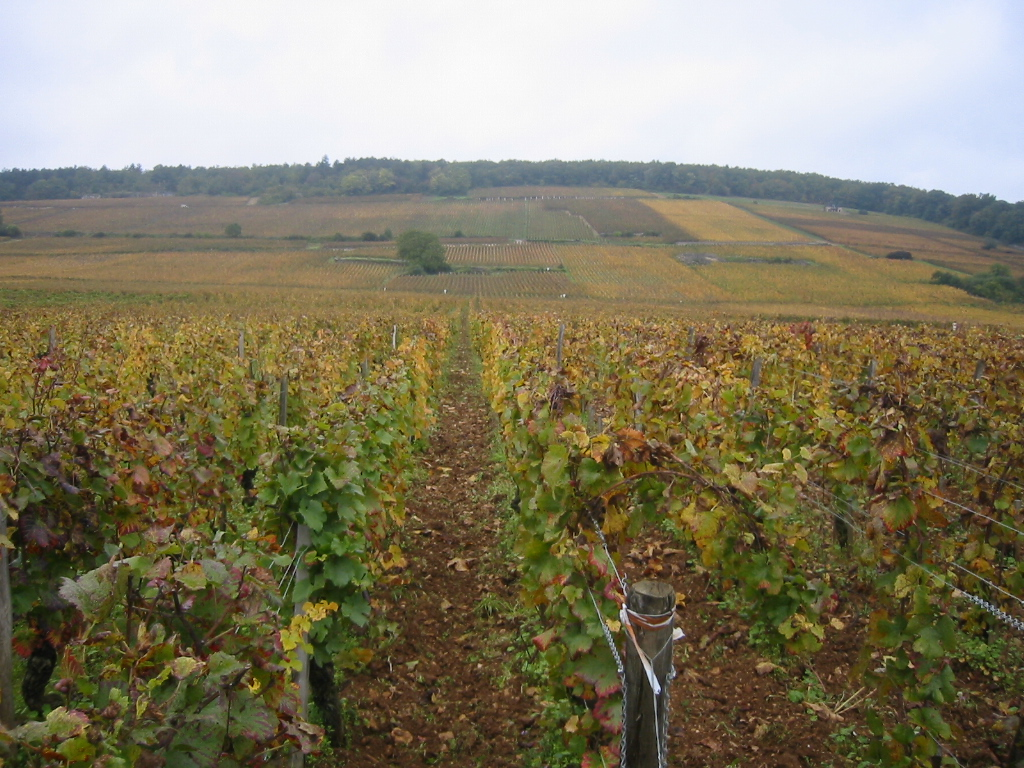
Vineyards in Gevrey-Chambertin.

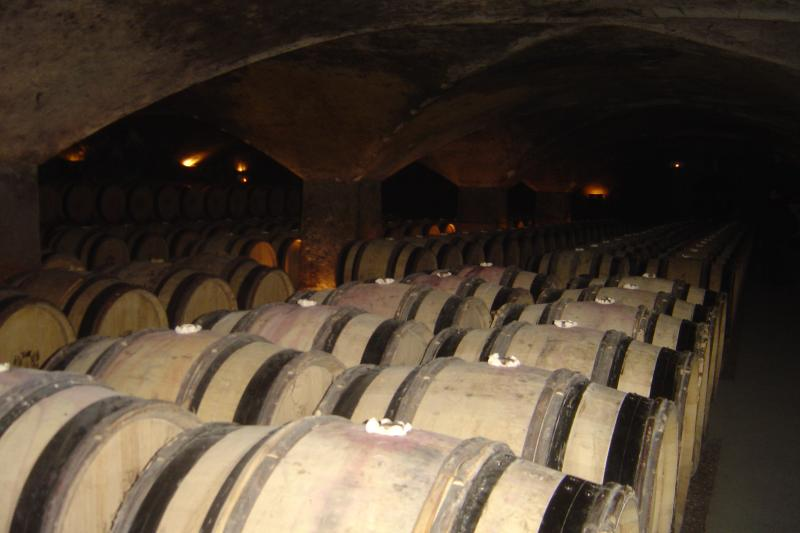
A barrel cellar of a Gevrey-Chambertin wine producer.

Gevrey-Chambertin wine is produced in the communes of Gevrey-Chambertin and Brochon in the Côte de Nuits subregion of Burgundy. The Appellation d'origine contrôlée (AOC) Gevrey-Chambertin may be used only for red wine with Pinot noir as the main grape variety. There are nine Grand Cru vineyards within the commune of Gevrey-Chambertin, Chambertin and eight others called Chambertin in combination with something else, such as Chapelle-Chambertin. While Gevrey-Chambertin also has several highly regarded Premier Cru vineyards, it has a particularly large amount of vineyards at the village level for a Côte de Nuits appellation. This is because the vineyards of the AOC stretch further to the east (beyond the N74 road) than in most neighbouring AOCs.

== Wine style ==
Gevrey-Chambertin wines are highly colourful and potent for Burgundies, with intense aromas and flavours evoking blackcurrant, cherry, musk and liquorice, among others. The potency of Gevrey-Chambertin wines makes it a suitable accompaniment to stews and strong-flavoured cooking, such as grilled red meat, leg of mutton, beef Bourguignon, rabbit stew, coq au vin, coq au Chambertin, and strong cheeses, such as Époisses.

== Production ==
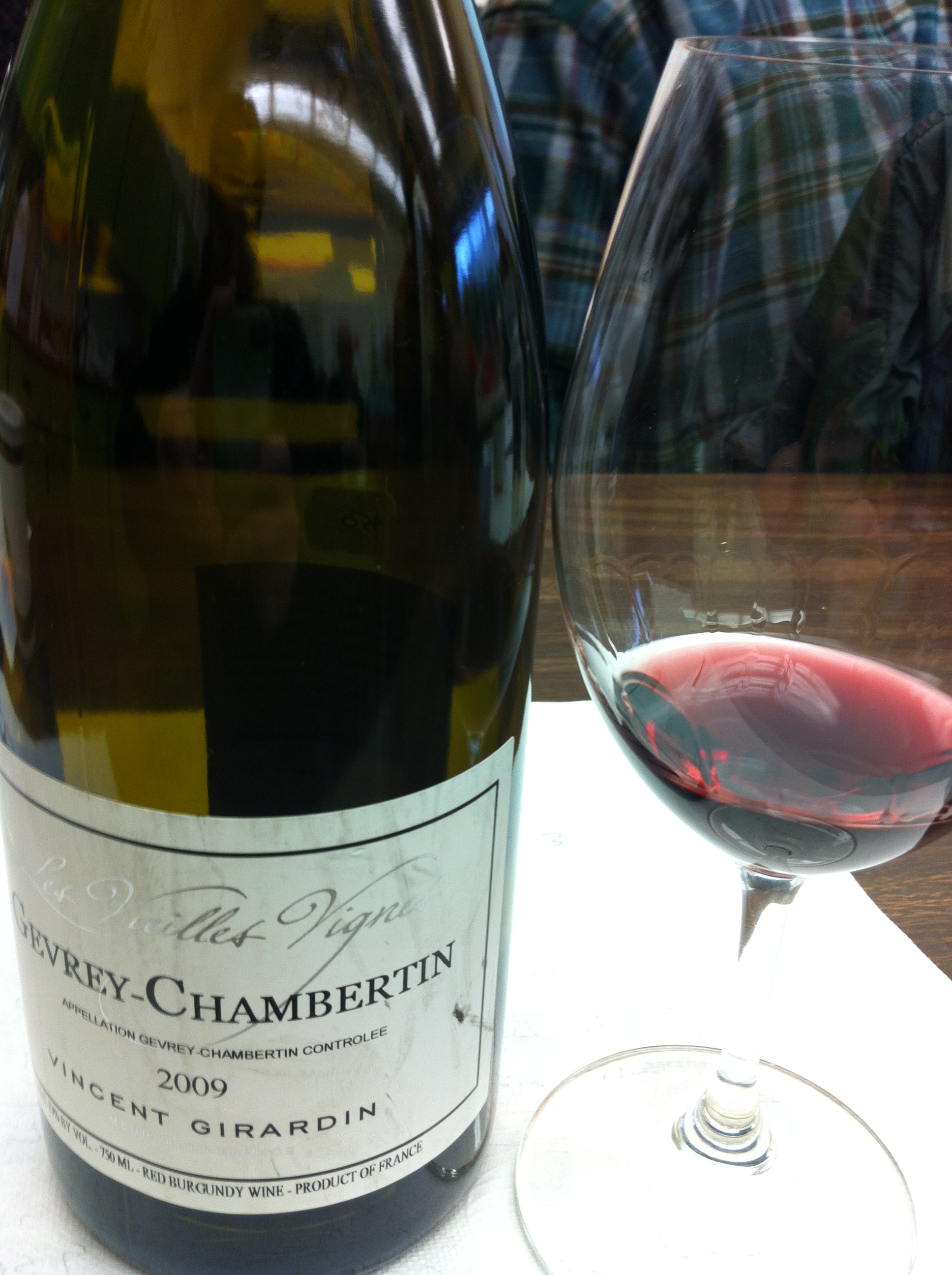
A village-level Burgundy wine from Gevrey-Chambertin.

In 2008, 409.65 hectares (1,012.3 acres) of vineyard surface was in production for Gevrey-Chambertin at village and Premier Cru level, making it the largest village-named appellation of the Côte de Nuits, and the second largest of the Côte d'Or, just behind Beaune AOC. In the same year, 17,282 hectoliter of red wine was produced, corresponding to just over 2.3 million bottles.

== AOC regulations ==
The AOC regulations allow up to 15 per cent total of Chardonnay, Pinot blanc and Pinot gris as accessory grapes in the red wines, but this is not practiced very often. The allowed base yield is 40 hectoliter per hectare, and the grapes must reach a maturity of at least 10.5 per cent potential alcohol for village-level wine and 11.0 per cent for Premier Cru wine.

== Premiers Crus ==
The 26 climats in Gevrey-Chambertin listed below are classified as Premier Cru vineyards. Some of the Premier Cru vineyards are located around the group of Grand Cru vineyards, south of the village, while some are located together on a slope to the northwest of the village. Their wines are designated Gevrey-Chambertin Premier Cru + vineyard name, or as just Gevrey-Chambertin Premier Cru, in which case it is possible to blend wine from several Premier Cru vineyards within the AOC.

In 2007, 78.24 hectares (193.3 acres) of the total Gevrey-Chambertin vineyard surface consisted of Premier Cru vineyards. The annual production of Premier Cru wine, as a five-year average, is 3,259 hectoliter.

- La Bossière
- La Romanée
- Poissenot
- Estournelles-Saint-Jacques
- Clos des Varoilles
- Lavaux Saint-Jacques
- Les Cazetiers
- Clos du Chapitre
- Clos Saint-Jacques
- Champeaux
- Petits Cazetiers
- Combe au Moine
- Les Goulots
- Aux Combottes
- Bel Air
- Cherbaudes
- Petite Chapelle
- En Ergot
- Clos Prieur
- La Perrière
- Au Closeau
- Issarts
- Les Corbeaux
- Craipillot
- Fonteny
- Champonnet

Clos Saint-Jacques, which is situated in the centre of the group of Premiers Crus to the northwest of the village, is typically the most highly regarded Premier Cru vineyard of Gevrey-Chambertin. The wine from this and some other vineyards often command prices higher than many Grand Cru wines from Côte de Nuits.

== Grands Crus ==
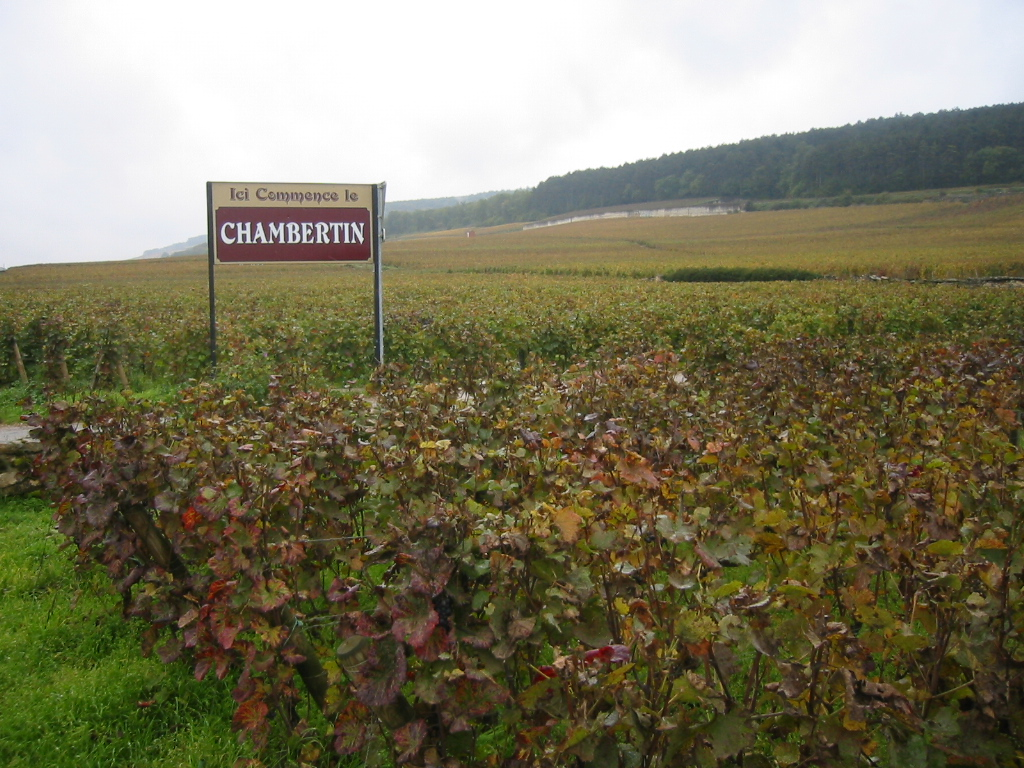
The start of the Chambertin vineyard, as seen from the Route des Grands Crus.

The nine Grands Crus all lie to the south of the town, on both sides of the Route des Grands Crus. Chambertin is the most famous of these vineyards. Chambertin-Clos de Bèze may also be called Chambertin, without the "Clos de Bèze" part, and Charmes-Chambertin and Mazoyères-Chambertin both have the same production zone, meaning that these names can be used interchangeably by producers.
