= Route des Grands Crus =

Tourist road in Burgundy, France

Coordinates: 47°4′4.8″N 4°52′15.6″E

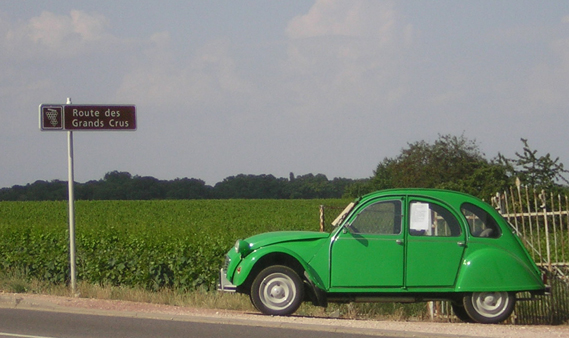
2CV on the Route des Grands Crus

The Route des Grands Crus (French pronunciation: [ʁut de ɡʁɑ̃ kʁy]; roughly, "road of the great wines") is the name of a tourist route situated in Burgundy, France.

The approximately 60-kilometre route runs along the foot of the Côte d'Or escarpment, from Dijon in the north to Santenay in the south. Thus it runs through many of the great appellations of Burgundy wine, hence the name of the route. It takes the visitor through the vineyards of the Côte de Nuits and the Côte de Beaune and the back hills (Hautes-Côtes) behind and above the wine slopes.

It is punctuated by 33 villages or little towns, including Beaune, many of which have picturesque churches.

== Route ==
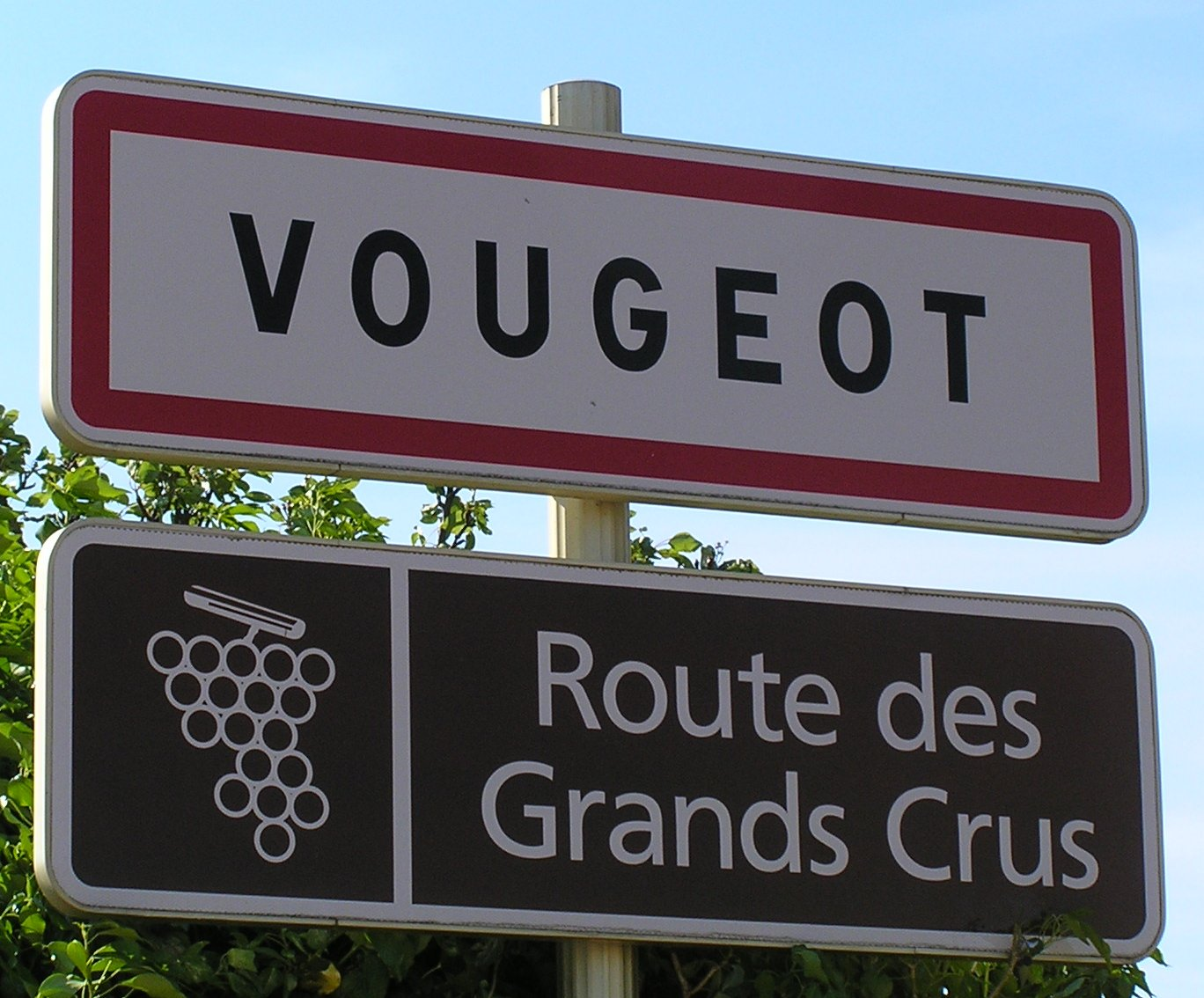
A sign advertising the Route Des Grands Crus and the village of Vougeot

From north to south:

- Marsannay-la-Côte
- Côte de Nuits
  - Fixin
  - Gevrey-Chambertin
  - Morey-Saint-Denis
  - Chambolle-Musigny
  - Vougeot
  - Flagey-Echézeaux
  - Vosne-Romanée
  - Nuits-Saint-Georges
- Côte de Beaune
  - Aloxe-Corton
  - Savigny-Lès-Beaune
  - Beaune
  - Pommard
  - Volnay
  - Meursault

== See also ==
- French wine
- Burgundy wine
- Côte de Nuits
- Saisy
