= Cru (wine) =

Wine term used to indicate a high-quality vineyard or group of vineyards

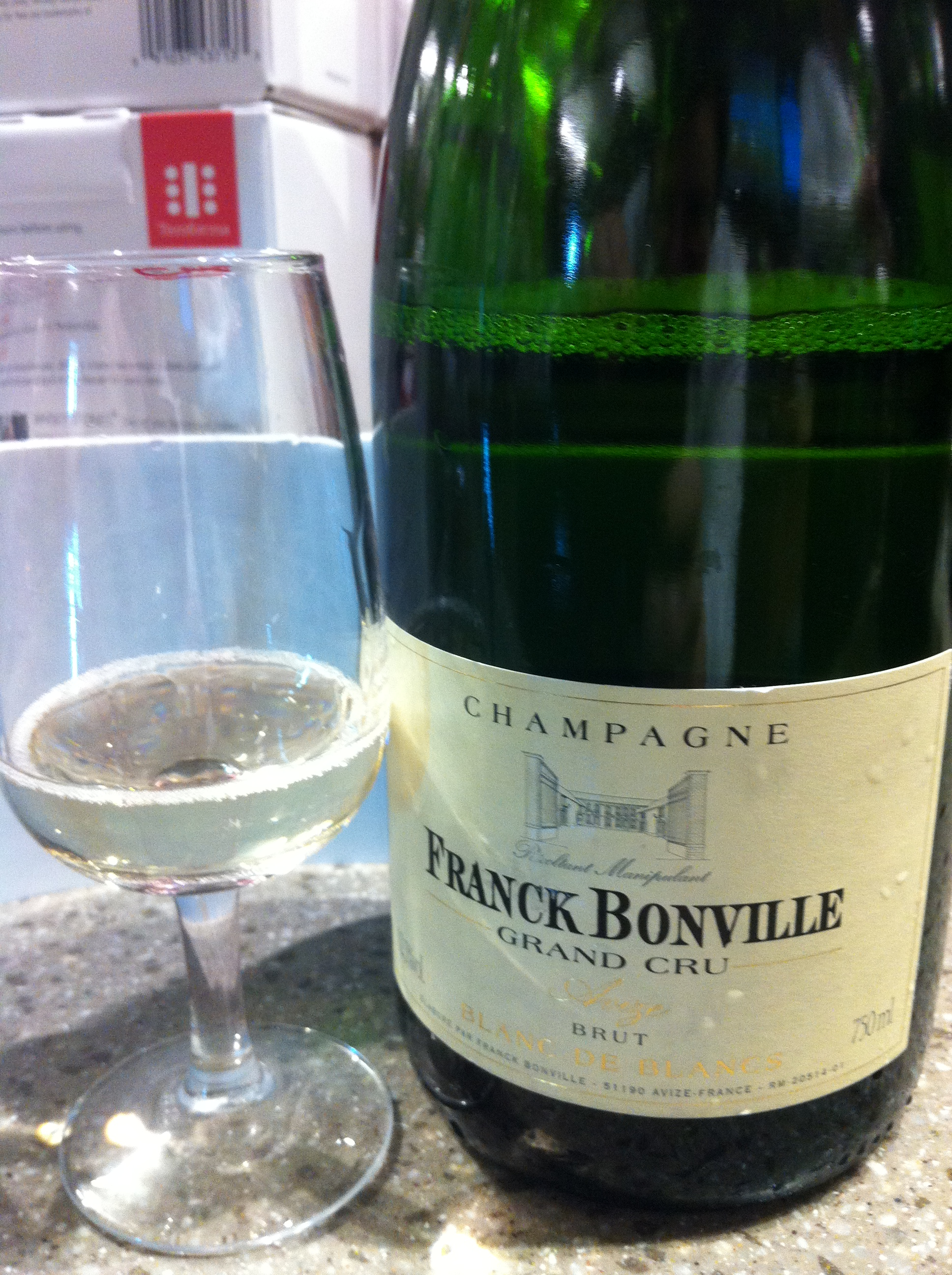
A blanc de blancs Champagne made 100% from Chardonnay

Cru is a wine term used to indicate a high-quality vineyard or group of vineyards. It is a French word which was originally used to refer to both a region and anything grown in it, but is now mostly used to refer to both a vineyard and its wines. The term is often used within classifications of French wine. By implication, a wine that displays (or is allowed to display) the name of its cru on its wine label is supposed to exhibit the typical characteristics of this vineyard or group of vineyards. The terms premier cru and grand cru designate levels of presumed quality that are variously defined in different wine regions.

== Premier cru ==
Premier cru is a French language wine term corresponding to "first growth" and which can be used to refer to classified vineyards, wineries and wines, with different meanings in different wine regions:

- For Bordeaux wine, the term is applied to classified wineries:
  - In the Bordeaux Wine Official Classification of 1855, Premier cru or Premier cru classé is the highest level of five within the "Grand cru classé" designation for red wines from the Médoc and Graves, and the second-highest of three in Sauternes where the highest is Premier cru supérieur (superior first growth). These wines are often referred to as first growths in English.
  - In the classification of Saint-Émilion wine, the highest level is Premier grand cru classé A and the second highest Premier grand cru classé B. The term Saint-Émilion grand cru refers to wineries or wines below the overall Grand cru classé level, and is integrated within the appellation rules.
- For Burgundy wine, the term is applied to classified vineyards, with Premier cru being the second highest classification level, below that of grand cru and above the basic village AOCs. For Burgundy wines, the terms premier cru (abbreviated 1er cru) are usually kept rather than being translated into English.

== Grand cru ==
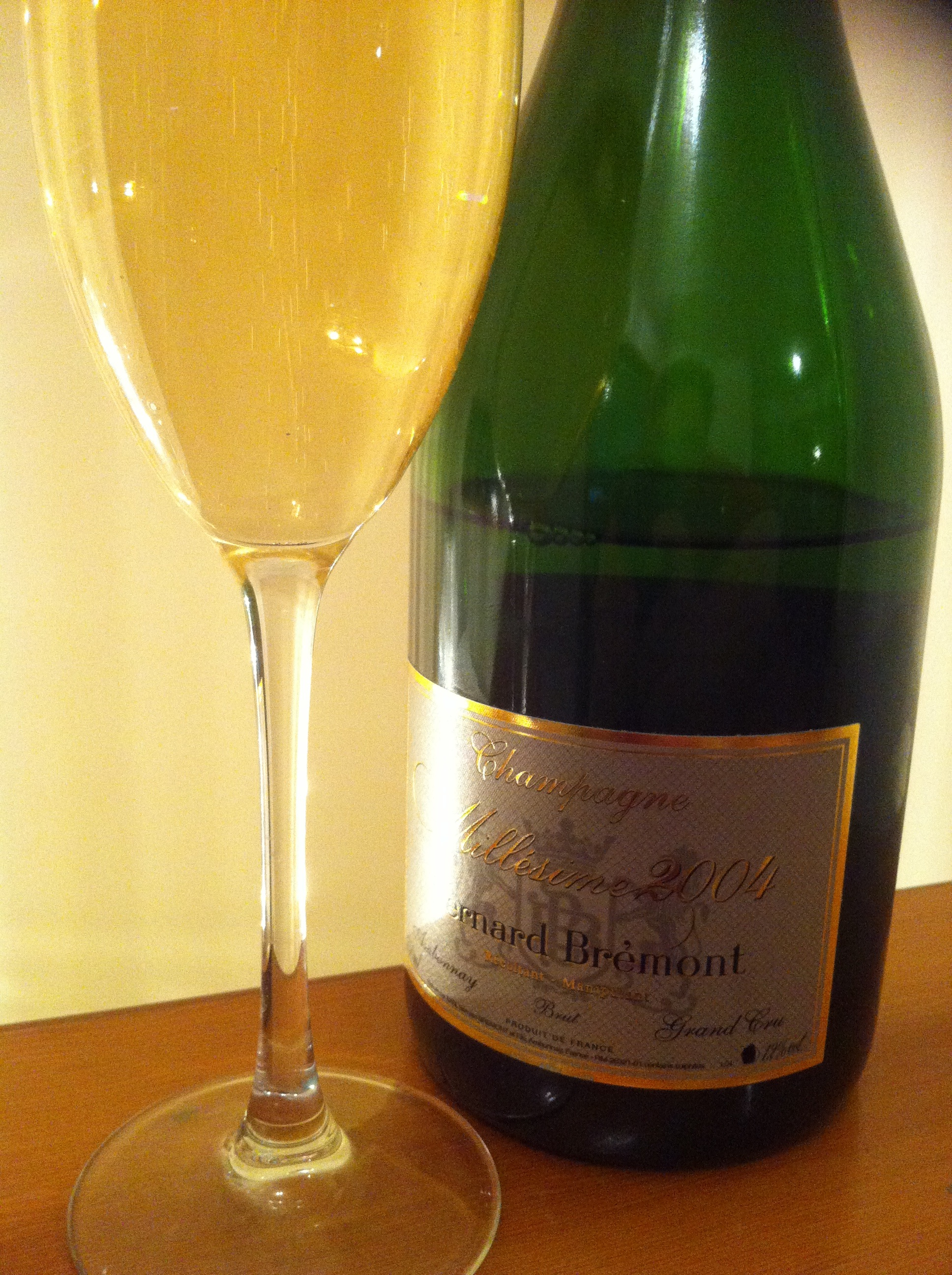
A French Grand Cru Champagne from the village of Ambonnay, a Bernard Brémont Millésime 2004

Grand cru (French for 'great growth') is a regional wine classification that designates a vineyard known for its favorable reputation in producing wine. Although often used to describe grapes, wine or cognac, the term is not technically a classification of wine quality per se, but is intended to indicate the potential of the vineyard or terroir. It is the highest level of classification of appellation d'origine contrôlée (AOC) wines from Burgundy or Alsace. The same term is applied to châteaux in Saint-Émilion although in that region, it has a different meaning and does not represent the top tier of classification.

=== History in Burgundy ===
Early Burgundian wine history is distinctly marked by the work of the Cistercians with the Catholic Church being the principal vineyard owner for most of the Middle Ages. Receiving land and vineyards as tithes, endowments and as exchanges for indulgences the monks were able to studiously observe the quality of wines from individual plots and, over time, began to isolate those areas that would consistently produce wine of similar aroma, body, color and vigor and designate them as crus.

Following the success of the Bordeaux Wine Official Classification of 1855, Jules Lavalle developed an informal classification of vineyards of the Côte d'Or in his book History and Statistics of the Côte d'Or. In 1861, Lavalle's classification was formalized by the Beaune Committee of Agriculture. The designations of grand cru and premier cru were later developed and expanded on in the 1930s with the creation of the AOC system.

== See also ==
- Alsace Grand Cru AOC
- Cru Bourgeois
- Grand cru (food and drink)
- List of Burgundy Grand Crus
- List of Chablis crus
- Regional wine classification
- Route des Grands Crus
- Schoenenbourg (grand cru)
