= List of minor planets: 590001–591000 =

The following is a partial list of minor planets, running from minor-planet number 590001 through 591000, inclusive. The primary data for this and other partial lists is based on JPL's "Small-Body Orbital Elements" and data available from the Minor Planet Center. Critical list information is also provided by the MPC, unless otherwise specified from Lowell Observatory. A detailed description of the table's columns and additional sources are given on the main page including a complete list of every page in this series, and a statistical break-up on the dynamical classification of minor planets.

Also see the summary list of all named bodies in numerical and alphabetical order, and the corresponding naming citations for the number range of this particular list. New namings may only be added to this list after official publication, as the preannouncement of names is condemned by the Working Group for Small Bodies Nomenclature of the International Astronomical Union.

Near-Earth obj.	MBA (inner)	MBA (outer)	Centaur
Mars-crosser	MBA (middle)	Jupiter trojan	Trans-Neptunian obj.
Unclassified

== 590001–590100 ==
Designation			Discovery			Properties		Ref
Permanent	Provisional	Named after	Date	Site	Discoverer(s)	Category	Diam.	Ref
590001	2011 BR_{45}	—	August 23, 2004	Kitt Peak	Spacewatch	·	1.8 km	MPC · JPL
590002	2011 BO_{47}	—	January 31, 2011	Piszkés-tető	K. Sárneczky, Z. Kuli	EOS	1.8 km	MPC · JPL
590003	2011 BX_{58}	—	January 30, 2011	Mount Lemmon	Mount Lemmon Survey	·	780 m	MPC · JPL
590004	2011 BY_{61}	—	April 15, 2008	Kitt Peak	Spacewatch	·	1.0 km	MPC · JPL
590005	2011 BR_{63}	—	March 16, 2007	Kitt Peak	Spacewatch	·	1.6 km	MPC · JPL
590006	2011 BL_{64}	—	August 30, 2005	Palomar	NEAT	·	1.2 km	MPC · JPL
590007	2011 BZ_{69}	—	August 29, 2009	Kitt Peak	Spacewatch	·	550 m	MPC · JPL
590008	2011 BV_{83}	—	January 30, 2011	Mayhill-ISON	L. Elenin	·	1.2 km	MPC · JPL
590009	2011 BQ_{84}	—	November 15, 2010	Mount Lemmon	Mount Lemmon Survey	·	1.3 km	MPC · JPL
590010	2011 BC_{97}	—	January 16, 2011	Mount Lemmon	Mount Lemmon Survey	·	3.8 km	MPC · JPL
590011	2011 BG_{117}	—	January 10, 2007	Kitt Peak	Spacewatch	·	970 m	MPC · JPL
590012	2011 BG_{123}	—	February 7, 2011	Mount Lemmon	Mount Lemmon Survey	·	1.1 km	MPC · JPL
590013	2011 BY_{129}	—	August 6, 2005	Palomar	NEAT	·	1.4 km	MPC · JPL
590014	2011 BF_{142}	—	February 23, 2003	Kitt Peak	Spacewatch	·	910 m	MPC · JPL
590015	2011 BG_{149}	—	March 29, 2008	Kitt Peak	Spacewatch	·	760 m	MPC · JPL
590016	2011 BQ_{157}	—	September 25, 2009	Mount Lemmon	Mount Lemmon Survey	·	1.6 km	MPC · JPL
590017	2011 BL_{163}	—	January 27, 2007	Mount Lemmon	Mount Lemmon Survey	·	1.1 km	MPC · JPL
590018	2011 BC_{168}	—	February 26, 2007	Mount Lemmon	Mount Lemmon Survey	EUN	770 m	MPC · JPL
590019	2011 BQ_{185}	—	September 6, 2008	Kitt Peak	Spacewatch	·	2.5 km	MPC · JPL
590020	2011 BU_{185}	—	April 12, 2016	Haleakala	Pan-STARRS 1	·	840 m	MPC · JPL
590021	2011 BZ_{187}	—	December 21, 2015	Mount Lemmon	Mount Lemmon Survey	EOS	1.8 km	MPC · JPL
590022	2011 BP_{188}	—	March 27, 2012	Mount Lemmon	Mount Lemmon Survey	·	1.5 km	MPC · JPL
590023	2011 BC_{195}	—	January 23, 2011	Mount Lemmon	Mount Lemmon Survey	(5)	1.2 km	MPC · JPL
590024	2011 BU_{197}	—	January 26, 2011	Mount Lemmon	Mount Lemmon Survey	·	870 m	MPC · JPL
590025	2011 BU_{201}	—	January 23, 2011	Mount Lemmon	Mount Lemmon Survey	·	1.4 km	MPC · JPL
590026	2011 BZ_{202}	—	January 29, 2011	Kitt Peak	Spacewatch	·	1.4 km	MPC · JPL
590027	2011 CA_{21}	—	February 23, 2007	Mount Lemmon	Mount Lemmon Survey	·	830 m	MPC · JPL
590028	2011 CY_{22}	—	February 22, 2007	Kitt Peak	Spacewatch	·	1 km	MPC · JPL
590029	2011 CW_{57}	—	February 8, 2011	Mount Lemmon	Mount Lemmon Survey	EOS	1.4 km	MPC · JPL
590030	2011 CR_{74}	—	February 13, 2011	Mount Lemmon	Mount Lemmon Survey	·	1.5 km	MPC · JPL
590031	2011 CY_{96}	—	February 5, 2011	Haleakala	Pan-STARRS 1	·	960 m	MPC · JPL
590032	2011 CE_{99}	—	March 8, 2005	Mount Lemmon	Mount Lemmon Survey	·	3.3 km	MPC · JPL
590033	2011 CU_{114}	—	February 10, 2011	Mount Lemmon	Mount Lemmon Survey	·	1.0 km	MPC · JPL
590034	2011 CO_{121}	—	February 26, 2011	Mount Lemmon	Mount Lemmon Survey	·	2.6 km	MPC · JPL
590035	2011 CH_{122}	—	February 9, 2011	Mount Lemmon	Mount Lemmon Survey	·	1.0 km	MPC · JPL
590036	2011 CO_{123}	—	August 4, 2013	Haleakala	Pan-STARRS 1	·	770 m	MPC · JPL
590037	2011 CX_{129}	—	February 16, 2007	Mount Lemmon	Mount Lemmon Survey	KON	1.7 km	MPC · JPL
590038	2011 CJ_{133}	—	August 21, 2015	Haleakala	Pan-STARRS 1	·	2.1 km	MPC · JPL
590039	2011 CN_{133}	—	February 5, 2011	Haleakala	Pan-STARRS 1	·	790 m	MPC · JPL
590040	2011 DY_{2}	—	September 14, 1998	Kitt Peak	Spacewatch	·	1.0 km	MPC · JPL
590041	2011 DR_{11}	—	February 22, 2011	Kitt Peak	Spacewatch	·	1.0 km	MPC · JPL
590042	2011 DQ_{17}	—	February 26, 2011	Mount Lemmon	Mount Lemmon Survey	MAR	740 m	MPC · JPL
590043	2011 DP_{20}	—	January 27, 2011	Mount Lemmon	Mount Lemmon Survey	·	1.4 km	MPC · JPL
590044	2011 DY_{45}	—	March 11, 2007	Mount Lemmon	Mount Lemmon Survey	·	1.1 km	MPC · JPL
590045	2011 DO_{51}	—	March 12, 2003	Palomar	NEAT	·	1.4 km	MPC · JPL
590046	2011 DZ_{54}	—	February 25, 2011	Mount Lemmon	Mount Lemmon Survey	·	740 m	MPC · JPL
590047	2011 DX_{56}	—	February 26, 2011	Mount Lemmon	Mount Lemmon Survey	·	1.4 km	MPC · JPL
590048	2011 EG_{8}	—	March 2, 2011	Bergisch Gladbach	W. Bickel	·	1.4 km	MPC · JPL
590049	2011 EH_{16}	—	March 31, 2003	Anderson Mesa	LONEOS	(5)	1.4 km	MPC · JPL
590050	2011 ED_{33}	—	March 10, 2007	Mount Lemmon	Mount Lemmon Survey	·	1.1 km	MPC · JPL
590051	2011 EK_{39}	—	September 4, 2008	Kitt Peak	Spacewatch	·	1.5 km	MPC · JPL
590052	2011 EM_{50}	—	March 11, 2011	Mayhill-ISON	L. Elenin	·	1.1 km	MPC · JPL
590053	2011 EX_{85}	—	April 9, 2003	Palomar	NEAT	·	1.0 km	MPC · JPL
590054	2011 EX_{89}	—	March 9, 2011	Mount Lemmon	Mount Lemmon Survey	·	1.2 km	MPC · JPL
590055	2011 EV_{91}	—	March 11, 2011	Kitt Peak	Spacewatch	HNS	780 m	MPC · JPL
590056	2011 ED_{93}	—	October 21, 2017	Mount Lemmon	Mount Lemmon Survey	·	1.2 km	MPC · JPL
590057	2011 EY_{96}	—	June 4, 2016	Mount Lemmon	Mount Lemmon Survey	·	960 m	MPC · JPL
590058	2011 EQ_{100}	—	March 13, 2011	Mount Lemmon	Mount Lemmon Survey	·	1.4 km	MPC · JPL
590059	2011 ES_{102}	—	March 9, 2011	Mount Lemmon	Mount Lemmon Survey	·	1.5 km	MPC · JPL
590060	2011 EZ_{103}	—	March 11, 2011	Mount Lemmon	Mount Lemmon Survey	·	1.2 km	MPC · JPL
590061	2011 FW_{9}	—	April 15, 2007	Kitt Peak	Spacewatch	·	1.3 km	MPC · JPL
590062	2011 FT_{17}	—	January 9, 2002	Socorro	LINEAR	·	1.7 km	MPC · JPL
590063	2011 FR_{24}	—	March 9, 2011	Kitt Peak	Spacewatch	·	1.1 km	MPC · JPL
590064	2011 FH_{26}	—	March 14, 2011	Catalina	CSS	·	1.5 km	MPC · JPL
590065	2011 FE_{32}	—	December 24, 2005	Socorro	LINEAR	RAF	1.2 km	MPC · JPL
590066	2011 FD_{36}	—	September 25, 2005	Kitt Peak	Spacewatch	·	1.2 km	MPC · JPL
590067	2011 FD_{38}	—	March 30, 2011	Mount Lemmon	Mount Lemmon Survey	MAR	740 m	MPC · JPL
590068	2011 FH_{42}	—	March 26, 2011	Mount Lemmon	Mount Lemmon Survey	·	1.0 km	MPC · JPL
590069	2011 FJ_{49}	—	March 25, 2011	Haleakala	Pan-STARRS 1	·	1.3 km	MPC · JPL
590070	2011 FN_{55}	—	May 1, 2003	Kitt Peak	Spacewatch	·	1.8 km	MPC · JPL
590071	2011 FP_{61}	—	September 24, 2008	Kitt Peak	Spacewatch	·	1.5 km	MPC · JPL
590072	2011 FP_{64}	—	July 11, 2004	Palomar	NEAT	MAR	1.4 km	MPC · JPL
590073	2011 FE_{67}	—	October 5, 2004	Palomar	NEAT	·	1.6 km	MPC · JPL
590074	2011 FK_{92}	—	March 28, 2011	Mount Lemmon	Mount Lemmon Survey	·	900 m	MPC · JPL
590075	2011 FU_{102}	—	March 23, 2003	Apache Point	SDSS Collaboration	·	1.4 km	MPC · JPL
590076	2011 FB_{103}	—	March 6, 2011	Mount Lemmon	Mount Lemmon Survey	JUN	760 m	MPC · JPL
590077	2011 FT_{107}	—	April 1, 2011	Mount Lemmon	Mount Lemmon Survey	MAR	600 m	MPC · JPL
590078	2011 FD_{108}	—	March 14, 2007	Mount Lemmon	Mount Lemmon Survey	·	1.2 km	MPC · JPL
590079	2011 FK_{110}	—	April 1, 2011	Mount Lemmon	Mount Lemmon Survey	·	1.1 km	MPC · JPL
590080	2011 FM_{115}	—	April 2, 2011	Mount Lemmon	Mount Lemmon Survey	·	1.5 km	MPC · JPL
590081	2011 FW_{118}	—	March 14, 2011	Mount Lemmon	Mount Lemmon Survey	·	1.4 km	MPC · JPL
590082	2011 FX_{119}	—	April 2, 2011	Mount Lemmon	Mount Lemmon Survey	·	2.2 km	MPC · JPL
590083	2011 FS_{120}	—	October 8, 2008	Kitt Peak	Spacewatch	·	1.4 km	MPC · JPL
590084	2011 FF_{122}	—	January 28, 2007	Mount Lemmon	Mount Lemmon Survey	·	820 m	MPC · JPL
590085	2011 FS_{122}	—	April 5, 2011	Mount Lemmon	Mount Lemmon Survey	·	1.1 km	MPC · JPL
590086	2011 FQ_{126}	—	January 10, 2011	Mount Lemmon	Mount Lemmon Survey	·	1.5 km	MPC · JPL
590087	2011 FG_{149}	—	October 27, 2005	Catalina	CSS	·	930 m	MPC · JPL
590088	2011 FZ_{151}	—	March 25, 2011	Mount Lemmon	Mount Lemmon Survey	·	1.1 km	MPC · JPL
590089	2011 FG_{157}	—	April 6, 2011	Les Engarouines	L. Bernasconi	·	1.1 km	MPC · JPL
590090	2011 FE_{158}	—	June 2, 2008	Mount Lemmon	Mount Lemmon Survey	MAS	770 m	MPC · JPL
590091	2011 FK_{160}	—	November 9, 2013	Haleakala	Pan-STARRS 1	·	1.4 km	MPC · JPL
590092	2011 FX_{160}	—	March 26, 2011	Mount Lemmon	Mount Lemmon Survey	·	2.4 km	MPC · JPL
590093	2011 FZ_{164}	—	June 4, 2016	Mount Lemmon	Mount Lemmon Survey	·	1.1 km	MPC · JPL
590094	2011 FB_{167}	—	January 17, 2015	Mount Lemmon	Mount Lemmon Survey	AGN	830 m	MPC · JPL
590095	2011 FQ_{167}	—	March 29, 2011	Kitt Peak	Spacewatch	EUN	1.1 km	MPC · JPL
590096	2011 GP_{2}	—	March 27, 2011	Mount Lemmon	Mount Lemmon Survey	·	1.1 km	MPC · JPL
590097	2011 GE_{5}	—	October 23, 2001	Anderson Mesa	LONEOS	·	1.5 km	MPC · JPL
590098	2011 GX_{20}	—	September 23, 2008	Kitt Peak	Spacewatch	·	2.8 km	MPC · JPL
590099	2011 GP_{22}	—	April 2, 2011	Mount Lemmon	Mount Lemmon Survey	·	1.0 km	MPC · JPL
590100	2011 GV_{26}	—	April 4, 2011	Mount Lemmon	Mount Lemmon Survey	·	1.3 km	MPC · JPL

== 590101–590200 ==
back to top

Designation			Discovery			Properties		Ref
Permanent	Provisional	Named after	Date	Site	Discoverer(s)	Category	Diam.	Ref
590101	2011 GK_{35}	—	February 21, 2002	Kitt Peak	Spacewatch	·	1.4 km	MPC · JPL
590102	2011 GP_{51}	—	March 11, 2011	Kitt Peak	Spacewatch	GAL	1.4 km	MPC · JPL
590103	2011 GR_{51}	—	September 11, 2007	Mount Lemmon	Mount Lemmon Survey	·	2.9 km	MPC · JPL
590104	2011 GG_{53}	—	April 5, 2011	Kitt Peak	Spacewatch	MAR	790 m	MPC · JPL
590105	2011 GY_{89}	—	April 1, 2011	Mount Lemmon	Mount Lemmon Survey	·	1.3 km	MPC · JPL
590106	2011 GS_{93}	—	November 27, 2013	Haleakala	Pan-STARRS 1	·	980 m	MPC · JPL
590107	2011 GY_{96}	—	October 16, 2013	Mount Lemmon	Mount Lemmon Survey	EUN	840 m	MPC · JPL
590108	2011 GB_{101}	—	April 12, 2011	Mount Lemmon	Mount Lemmon Survey	·	920 m	MPC · JPL
590109	2011 GD_{101}	—	April 12, 2011	Mount Lemmon	Mount Lemmon Survey	·	1.4 km	MPC · JPL
590110	2011 GR_{101}	—	April 8, 2011	Siding Spring	SSS	JUN	1.1 km	MPC · JPL
590111	2011 HO_{8}	—	April 21, 2011	Haleakala	Pan-STARRS 1	·	1.4 km	MPC · JPL
590112	2011 HF_{25}	—	April 13, 2002	Palomar	NEAT	·	1.7 km	MPC · JPL
590113	2011 HV_{28}	—	November 5, 2004	Needville	J. Dellinger	·	1.7 km	MPC · JPL
590114	2011 HX_{28}	—	December 13, 2004	Junk Bond	D. Healy	·	2.4 km	MPC · JPL
590115	2011 HT_{46}	—	April 6, 2011	Mount Lemmon	Mount Lemmon Survey	·	1.1 km	MPC · JPL
590116	2011 HT_{52}	—	April 30, 2011	Haleakala	Pan-STARRS 1	·	1.5 km	MPC · JPL
590117	2011 HJ_{53}	—	April 30, 2011	Kitt Peak	Spacewatch	·	2.8 km	MPC · JPL
590118	2011 HB_{56}	—	May 5, 2002	Palomar	NEAT	·	2.3 km	MPC · JPL
590119	2011 HW_{72}	—	November 9, 2009	Kitt Peak	Spacewatch	(5)	1.4 km	MPC · JPL
590120	2011 HT_{80}	—	January 17, 2011	Mount Lemmon	Mount Lemmon Survey	JUN	1.2 km	MPC · JPL
590121	2011 HW_{109}	—	April 30, 2011	Haleakala	Pan-STARRS 1	·	2.1 km	MPC · JPL
590122	2011 HY_{109}	—	April 28, 2011	Mount Lemmon	Mount Lemmon Survey	EUN	1.1 km	MPC · JPL
590123	2011 HF_{110}	—	April 26, 2011	Kitt Peak	Spacewatch	DOR	2.3 km	MPC · JPL
590124	2011 JS_{4}	—	October 4, 2008	Catalina	CSS	·	2.5 km	MPC · JPL
590125	2011 JO_{10}	—	May 5, 2011	Kitt Peak	Spacewatch	·	1.4 km	MPC · JPL
590126	2011 JS_{10}	—	May 6, 2011	Mount Lemmon	Mount Lemmon Survey	·	1.4 km	MPC · JPL
590127	2011 JV_{13}	—	April 25, 2007	Kitt Peak	Spacewatch	·	1.4 km	MPC · JPL
590128	2011 JJ_{14}	—	April 30, 2011	Haleakala	Pan-STARRS 1	·	1.6 km	MPC · JPL
590129	2011 JQ_{18}	—	May 1, 2011	Haleakala	Pan-STARRS 1	·	1.5 km	MPC · JPL
590130	2011 JG_{19}	—	May 1, 2011	Haleakala	Pan-STARRS 1	·	1.7 km	MPC · JPL
590131	2011 JU_{30}	—	May 13, 2011	Mount Lemmon	Mount Lemmon Survey	·	590 m	MPC · JPL
590132	2011 JC_{32}	—	May 3, 2011	Marly	P. Kocher	HNS	1.2 km	MPC · JPL
590133	2011 JJ_{33}	—	August 26, 2012	Haleakala	Pan-STARRS 1	·	1.4 km	MPC · JPL
590134	2011 JP_{33}	—	May 1, 2011	Haleakala	Pan-STARRS 1	MAR	1.1 km	MPC · JPL
590135	2011 JB_{37}	—	May 8, 2011	Mount Lemmon	Mount Lemmon Survey	AEO	910 m	MPC · JPL
590136	2011 KC_{1}	—	May 5, 2011	Mount Lemmon	Mount Lemmon Survey	·	1.5 km	MPC · JPL
590137	2011 KE_{12}	—	May 24, 2011	Nogales	M. Schwartz, P. R. Holvorcem	·	800 m	MPC · JPL
590138	2011 KJ_{40}	—	January 30, 2011	Haleakala	Pan-STARRS 1	·	1.1 km	MPC · JPL
590139	2011 KH_{42}	—	November 10, 2009	Kitt Peak	Spacewatch	·	1.3 km	MPC · JPL
590140	2011 KE_{45}	—	May 28, 2011	Mount Lemmon	Mount Lemmon Survey	·	1.3 km	MPC · JPL
590141	2011 KL_{45}	—	April 9, 2003	Kitt Peak	Spacewatch	·	1.4 km	MPC · JPL
590142	2011 KR_{51}	—	May 24, 2011	Haleakala	Pan-STARRS 1	·	1.8 km	MPC · JPL
590143	2011 KU_{51}	—	May 28, 2011	Mount Lemmon	Mount Lemmon Survey	·	1.6 km	MPC · JPL
590144	2011 KE_{55}	—	May 26, 2011	Mount Lemmon	Mount Lemmon Survey	·	1.2 km	MPC · JPL
590145	2011 LZ_{14}	—	July 2, 2008	Kitt Peak	Spacewatch	·	530 m	MPC · JPL
590146	2011 MQ_{6}	—	June 5, 2011	Mount Lemmon	Mount Lemmon Survey	·	2.0 km	MPC · JPL
590147	2011 OS_{7}	—	June 12, 2011	Mount Lemmon	Mount Lemmon Survey	·	2.1 km	MPC · JPL
590148	2011 OT_{31}	—	February 8, 2007	Kitt Peak	Spacewatch	·	590 m	MPC · JPL
590149	2011 OT_{45}	—	June 27, 2011	Mount Lemmon	Mount Lemmon Survey	·	1.9 km	MPC · JPL
590150	2011 OM_{61}	—	July 28, 2011	Haleakala	Pan-STARRS 1	·	1.9 km	MPC · JPL
590151	2011 OX_{70}	—	July 27, 2011	Charleston	R. Holmes	·	1.4 km	MPC · JPL
590152	2011 PX_{7}	—	August 6, 2011	Haleakala	Pan-STARRS 1	·	1.6 km	MPC · JPL
590153	2011 PC_{21}	—	August 1, 2011	Haleakala	Pan-STARRS 1	·	560 m	MPC · JPL
590154	2011 QF_{37}	—	February 24, 2009	Calar Alto	F. Hormuth	·	2.0 km	MPC · JPL
590155	2011 QV_{54}	—	August 30, 2011	Haleakala	Pan-STARRS 1	615	1.4 km	MPC · JPL
590156	2011 QP_{57}	—	August 30, 2011	Haleakala	Pan-STARRS 1	·	660 m	MPC · JPL
590157	2011 QC_{91}	—	December 31, 2008	Mount Lemmon	Mount Lemmon Survey	·	1.9 km	MPC · JPL
590158	2011 QP_{93}	—	September 18, 2006	Kitt Peak	Spacewatch	·	1.8 km	MPC · JPL
590159	2011 QZ_{100}	—	February 26, 2014	Mount Lemmon	Mount Lemmon Survey	·	1.6 km	MPC · JPL
590160	2011 QL_{103}	—	May 21, 2015	Haleakala	Pan-STARRS 1	·	1.5 km	MPC · JPL
590161	2011 QU_{109}	—	August 30, 2011	Haleakala	Pan-STARRS 1	·	2.2 km	MPC · JPL
590162	2011 QX_{112}	—	August 31, 2011	Haleakala	Pan-STARRS 1	·	750 m	MPC · JPL
590163	2011 RW_{7}	—	September 5, 2011	Haleakala	Pan-STARRS 1	·	1.3 km	MPC · JPL
590164	2011 RB_{14}	—	September 2, 2011	Haleakala	Pan-STARRS 1	H	300 m	MPC · JPL
590165	2011 RU_{14}	—	September 6, 2011	Great Shefford	Birtwhistle, P.	·	1.9 km	MPC · JPL
590166	2011 RL_{18}	—	March 2, 2009	Kitt Peak	Spacewatch	·	2.4 km	MPC · JPL
590167	2011 RO_{22}	—	September 4, 2011	Haleakala	Pan-STARRS 1	KOR	1.2 km	MPC · JPL
590168	2011 RG_{23}	—	September 4, 2011	Haleakala	Pan-STARRS 1	·	1.4 km	MPC · JPL
590169	2011 RR_{27}	—	September 2, 2011	Haleakala	Pan-STARRS 1	·	2.0 km	MPC · JPL
590170	2011 RT_{28}	—	September 8, 2011	Haleakala	Pan-STARRS 1	·	1.6 km	MPC · JPL
590171	2011 SY_{19}	—	August 13, 2006	Palomar	NEAT	BRA	1.9 km	MPC · JPL
590172	2011 SE_{39}	—	September 5, 2000	Apache Point	SDSS Collaboration	·	2.8 km	MPC · JPL
590173	2011 SX_{49}	—	September 26, 2006	Mount Lemmon	Mount Lemmon Survey	·	1.3 km	MPC · JPL
590174	2011 SY_{72}	—	April 9, 2010	Mount Lemmon	Mount Lemmon Survey	·	560 m	MPC · JPL
590175	2011 SE_{106}	—	September 23, 2011	Taunus	E. Schwab	·	1.8 km	MPC · JPL
590176	2011 SE_{131}	—	October 2, 2006	Mount Lemmon	Mount Lemmon Survey	·	1.5 km	MPC · JPL
590177	2011 SR_{136}	—	September 4, 2011	Haleakala	Pan-STARRS 1	·	550 m	MPC · JPL
590178	2011 SJ_{138}	—	September 18, 2006	Kitt Peak	Spacewatch	·	1.5 km	MPC · JPL
590179	2011 SJ_{140}	—	September 23, 2011	Haleakala	Pan-STARRS 1	·	530 m	MPC · JPL
590180	2011 SR_{158}	—	October 22, 2001	Socorro	LINEAR	·	650 m	MPC · JPL
590181	2011 SQ_{181}	—	September 26, 2011	Kitt Peak	Spacewatch	·	570 m	MPC · JPL
590182	2011 SZ_{189}	—	September 20, 2011	Haleakala	Pan-STARRS 1	KOR	1.2 km	MPC · JPL
590183	2011 SH_{200}	—	October 8, 2007	Kitt Peak	Spacewatch	·	1.1 km	MPC · JPL
590184	2011 SX_{209}	—	August 19, 2001	Cerro Tololo	Deep Ecliptic Survey	·	1.7 km	MPC · JPL
590185	2011 SB_{215}	—	September 20, 2011	Mount Lemmon	Mount Lemmon Survey	·	630 m	MPC · JPL
590186	2011 SC_{225}	—	September 30, 2006	Catalina	CSS	·	1.9 km	MPC · JPL
590187	2011 SA_{228}	—	July 18, 2006	Mount Lemmon	Mount Lemmon Survey	·	1.6 km	MPC · JPL
590188	2011 SW_{231}	—	August 30, 2011	Kitt Peak	Spacewatch	·	1.6 km	MPC · JPL
590189	2011 SY_{232}	—	November 9, 2007	Kitt Peak	Spacewatch	·	1.5 km	MPC · JPL
590190	2011 SN_{234}	—	September 30, 2011	Taunus	E. Schwab, R. Kling	·	2.6 km	MPC · JPL
590191	2011 SJ_{236}	—	January 28, 2003	Apache Point	SDSS Collaboration	·	1.5 km	MPC · JPL
590192	2011 SF_{251}	—	November 11, 2007	Mount Lemmon	Mount Lemmon Survey	·	2.5 km	MPC · JPL
590193	2011 SY_{266}	—	September 20, 2011	Kitt Peak	Spacewatch	·	600 m	MPC · JPL
590194	2011 SC_{280}	—	March 23, 2003	Apache Point	SDSS Collaboration	·	700 m	MPC · JPL
590195	2011 SG_{281}	—	October 16, 2006	Catalina	CSS	·	1.9 km	MPC · JPL
590196	2011 SN_{281}	—	September 23, 2011	Kitt Peak	Spacewatch	·	2.0 km	MPC · JPL
590197	2011 SG_{283}	—	September 29, 2011	Mount Lemmon	Mount Lemmon Survey	EOS	1.5 km	MPC · JPL
590198	2011 SE_{291}	—	September 27, 2011	Mount Lemmon	Mount Lemmon Survey	·	1.9 km	MPC · JPL
590199	2011 SA_{297}	—	September 20, 2011	Haleakala	Pan-STARRS 1	·	1.9 km	MPC · JPL
590200	2011 SB_{308}	—	September 20, 2011	Haleakala	Pan-STARRS 1	HOF	2.2 km	MPC · JPL

== 590201–590300 ==
back to top

Designation			Discovery			Properties		Ref
Permanent	Provisional	Named after	Date	Site	Discoverer(s)	Category	Diam.	Ref
590201	2011 SX_{308}	—	September 18, 2011	Mount Lemmon	Mount Lemmon Survey	·	500 m	MPC · JPL
590202	2011 ST_{309}	—	September 23, 2011	Haleakala	Pan-STARRS 1	·	560 m	MPC · JPL
590203	2011 SB_{312}	—	September 20, 2011	Mount Lemmon	Mount Lemmon Survey	·	550 m	MPC · JPL
590204	2011 SO_{312}	—	September 26, 2011	Haleakala	Pan-STARRS 1	·	1.7 km	MPC · JPL
590205	2011 SZ_{314}	—	June 26, 2000	La Palma	T. Grav	·	1.5 km	MPC · JPL
590206	2011 SH_{323}	—	September 21, 2011	Kitt Peak	Spacewatch	·	2.4 km	MPC · JPL
590207	2011 TD_{2}	—	October 13, 2010	Mount Lemmon	Mount Lemmon Survey	L4	10 km	MPC · JPL
590208	2011 TQ_{3}	—	September 21, 2011	Kitt Peak	Spacewatch	EOS	1.5 km	MPC · JPL
590209	2011 TU_{14}	—	September 23, 2011	Kitt Peak	Spacewatch	·	1.9 km	MPC · JPL
590210	2011 UH_{5}	—	October 19, 2006	Mount Lemmon	Mount Lemmon Survey	·	2.0 km	MPC · JPL
590211	2011 UX_{11}	—	December 3, 2005	Mauna Kea	A. Boattini	·	900 m	MPC · JPL
590212	2011 UA_{12}	—	October 16, 2011	Haleakala	Pan-STARRS 1	·	2.0 km	MPC · JPL
590213	2011 UF_{35}	—	December 4, 2007	Catalina	CSS	·	1.2 km	MPC · JPL
590214	2011 UA_{45}	—	October 20, 2006	Kitt Peak	Spacewatch	EOS	1.6 km	MPC · JPL
590215	2011 UF_{45}	—	September 24, 2011	Haleakala	Pan-STARRS 1	·	2.0 km	MPC · JPL
590216	2011 UN_{45}	—	September 24, 2011	Haleakala	Pan-STARRS 1	·	2.0 km	MPC · JPL
590217	2011 UZ_{55}	—	October 18, 2011	Mount Lemmon	Mount Lemmon Survey	·	1.4 km	MPC · JPL
590218	2011 UD_{63}	—	September 4, 2011	Haleakala	Pan-STARRS 1	centaur	100 km	MPC · JPL
590219	2011 UE_{71}	—	September 3, 2010	Mount Lemmon	Mount Lemmon Survey	·	1.9 km	MPC · JPL
590220	2011 UM_{87}	—	October 21, 2011	Mount Lemmon	Mount Lemmon Survey	·	2.0 km	MPC · JPL
590221	2011 UT_{102}	—	July 29, 2005	Palomar	NEAT	·	2.3 km	MPC · JPL
590222	2011 UU_{102}	—	October 20, 2011	Mount Lemmon	Mount Lemmon Survey	·	490 m	MPC · JPL
590223	2011 UL_{106}	—	October 22, 2011	Siegen	Bill, H.	·	1.5 km	MPC · JPL
590224	2011 UX_{110}	—	October 21, 2011	Haleakala	Pan-STARRS 1	·	520 m	MPC · JPL
590225	2011 UE_{113}	—	August 29, 2005	Palomar	NEAT	·	2.5 km	MPC · JPL
590226	2011 UH_{129}	—	September 27, 2011	Mount Lemmon	Mount Lemmon Survey	H	410 m	MPC · JPL
590227	2011 US_{139}	—	October 6, 2005	Kitt Peak	Spacewatch	·	2.2 km	MPC · JPL
590228	2011 UM_{144}	—	October 1, 2011	Mount Lemmon	Mount Lemmon Survey	·	2.2 km	MPC · JPL
590229	2011 UO_{147}	—	September 23, 2011	Kitt Peak	Spacewatch	·	580 m	MPC · JPL
590230	2011 UP_{148}	—	August 20, 2004	Kitt Peak	Spacewatch	·	530 m	MPC · JPL
590231	2011 UP_{161}	—	October 23, 2011	Kitt Peak	Spacewatch	·	2.3 km	MPC · JPL
590232	2011 US_{161}	—	September 20, 2000	Kitt Peak	Spacewatch	·	2.3 km	MPC · JPL
590233	2011 UL_{165}	—	December 14, 2001	Palomar	NEAT	·	610 m	MPC · JPL
590234	2011 UE_{166}	—	October 26, 2011	Haleakala	Pan-STARRS 1	EOS	1.7 km	MPC · JPL
590235	2011 UF_{170}	—	October 21, 2011	Mount Lemmon	Mount Lemmon Survey	·	2.1 km	MPC · JPL
590236	2011 UD_{174}	—	October 23, 2011	Haleakala	Pan-STARRS 1	·	1.8 km	MPC · JPL
590237	2011 UJ_{176}	—	October 20, 2011	Mount Lemmon	Mount Lemmon Survey	·	2.0 km	MPC · JPL
590238	2011 UN_{181}	—	December 5, 2008	Kitt Peak	Spacewatch	·	830 m	MPC · JPL
590239	2011 UJ_{192}	—	January 12, 2008	Mount Lemmon	Mount Lemmon Survey	·	2.0 km	MPC · JPL
590240	2011 UO_{192}	—	October 18, 2011	Catalina	CSS	·	2.4 km	MPC · JPL
590241	2011 UF_{194}	—	September 27, 2006	Mount Lemmon	Mount Lemmon Survey	H	410 m	MPC · JPL
590242	2011 UJ_{194}	—	October 21, 2011	Piszkéstető	K. Sárneczky	PHO	1.5 km	MPC · JPL
590243	2011 UU_{194}	—	July 19, 2001	Palomar	NEAT	·	770 m	MPC · JPL
590244	2011 US_{199}	—	October 25, 2011	Haleakala	Pan-STARRS 1	·	630 m	MPC · JPL
590245	2011 US_{212}	—	January 12, 2008	Kitt Peak	Spacewatch	·	1.5 km	MPC · JPL
590246	2011 UY_{212}	—	September 23, 2011	Kitt Peak	Spacewatch	VER	2.1 km	MPC · JPL
590247	2011 US_{234}	—	October 16, 2007	Mount Lemmon	Mount Lemmon Survey	·	1.7 km	MPC · JPL
590248	2011 UZ_{243}	—	October 25, 2011	Haleakala	Pan-STARRS 1	·	1.9 km	MPC · JPL
590249	2011 UV_{247}	—	April 27, 2009	Mount Lemmon	Mount Lemmon Survey	·	2.4 km	MPC · JPL
590250	2011 UG_{257}	—	October 24, 2011	Haleakala	Pan-STARRS 1	·	2.1 km	MPC · JPL
590251	2011 UU_{261}	—	October 25, 2011	Haleakala	Pan-STARRS 1	·	640 m	MPC · JPL
590252	2011 UO_{262}	—	March 18, 2002	Kitt Peak	Deep Ecliptic Survey	·	1.4 km	MPC · JPL
590253	2011 UT_{266}	—	December 12, 2006	Kitt Peak	Spacewatch	·	2.1 km	MPC · JPL
590254	2011 UK_{267}	—	January 18, 2009	Kitt Peak	Spacewatch	·	460 m	MPC · JPL
590255	2011 UW_{277}	—	August 29, 2005	Kitt Peak	Spacewatch	·	1.5 km	MPC · JPL
590256	2011 UG_{278}	—	October 25, 2011	Haleakala	Pan-STARRS 1	·	1.9 km	MPC · JPL
590257	2011 UL_{286}	—	October 4, 2011	Piszkéstető	K. Sárneczky	·	2.1 km	MPC · JPL
590258	2011 UG_{287}	—	October 2, 2006	Mount Lemmon	Mount Lemmon Survey	·	1.8 km	MPC · JPL
590259	2011 UD_{296}	—	November 1, 2006	Kitt Peak	Spacewatch	·	1.4 km	MPC · JPL
590260	2011 UF_{296}	—	October 21, 2011	Kitt Peak	Spacewatch	TEL	1.2 km	MPC · JPL
590261	2011 UA_{303}	—	October 31, 2011	Mount Lemmon	Mount Lemmon Survey	·	1.8 km	MPC · JPL
590262	2011 UJ_{320}	—	October 30, 2011	Kitt Peak	Spacewatch	·	590 m	MPC · JPL
590263	2011 UQ_{320}	—	November 16, 2006	Mount Lemmon	Mount Lemmon Survey	·	1.6 km	MPC · JPL
590264	2011 UP_{321}	—	October 31, 2011	Mayhill-ISON	L. Elenin	·	1.8 km	MPC · JPL
590265	2011 UY_{325}	—	July 10, 2005	Kitt Peak	Spacewatch	EOS	1.9 km	MPC · JPL
590266	2011 UT_{329}	—	April 2, 2009	Kitt Peak	Spacewatch	·	1.6 km	MPC · JPL
590267	2011 UE_{330}	—	October 23, 2011	Mount Lemmon	Mount Lemmon Survey	·	1.6 km	MPC · JPL
590268	2011 US_{334}	—	September 8, 2011	Kitt Peak	Spacewatch	·	1.8 km	MPC · JPL
590269 Steinberger	2011 UF_{336}	Steinberger	September 27, 2011	Piszkéstető	K. Sárneczky, A. Farkas	·	2.0 km	MPC · JPL
590270	2011 UM_{340}	—	October 18, 2011	Kitt Peak	Spacewatch	EOS	1.5 km	MPC · JPL
590271	2011 UN_{340}	—	October 18, 2011	Kitt Peak	Spacewatch	·	630 m	MPC · JPL
590272	2011 UO_{356}	—	October 3, 2006	Mount Lemmon	Mount Lemmon Survey	·	1.3 km	MPC · JPL
590273	2011 UY_{358}	—	October 20, 2011	Mount Lemmon	Mount Lemmon Survey	·	1.5 km	MPC · JPL
590274	2011 UM_{359}	—	March 23, 2003	Apache Point	SDSS Collaboration	·	1.9 km	MPC · JPL
590275	2011 UF_{363}	—	October 11, 2006	Kitt Peak	Spacewatch	·	1.2 km	MPC · JPL
590276	2011 UG_{375}	—	June 20, 2010	Mount Lemmon	Mount Lemmon Survey	·	1.8 km	MPC · JPL
590277	2011 UH_{378}	—	September 24, 2011	Haleakala	Pan-STARRS 1	·	2.2 km	MPC · JPL
590278	2011 UU_{386}	—	October 25, 2011	Haleakala	Pan-STARRS 1	·	2.1 km	MPC · JPL
590279	2011 UJ_{400}	—	October 16, 2011	Haleakala	Pan-STARRS 1	·	2.4 km	MPC · JPL
590280	2011 UN_{401}	—	October 21, 2006	Catalina	CSS	H	430 m	MPC · JPL
590281	2011 UJ_{402}	—	April 8, 2010	La Sagra	OAM	H	600 m	MPC · JPL
590282	2011 UM_{402}	—	November 22, 2006	Catalina	CSS	H	440 m	MPC · JPL
590283	2011 UJ_{416}	—	October 24, 2011	Haleakala	Pan-STARRS 1	TIR	3.0 km	MPC · JPL
590284	2011 UW_{419}	—	January 18, 2013	Haleakala	Pan-STARRS 1	BRA	1.6 km	MPC · JPL
590285	2011 UJ_{420}	—	October 24, 2011	Haleakala	Pan-STARRS 1	·	2.5 km	MPC · JPL
590286	2011 UB_{421}	—	October 27, 2011	Mount Lemmon	Mount Lemmon Survey	EOS	1.4 km	MPC · JPL
590287	2011 UA_{422}	—	October 19, 2011	Mount Lemmon	Mount Lemmon Survey	·	2.6 km	MPC · JPL
590288	2011 UJ_{422}	—	October 26, 2011	Haleakala	Pan-STARRS 1	·	1.8 km	MPC · JPL
590289	2011 UL_{422}	—	October 20, 2011	Kitt Peak	Spacewatch	·	1.6 km	MPC · JPL
590290	2011 UX_{422}	—	December 15, 2006	Kitt Peak	Spacewatch	·	2.1 km	MPC · JPL
590291	2011 UF_{423}	—	April 6, 2014	Mount Lemmon	Mount Lemmon Survey	·	2.3 km	MPC · JPL
590292	2011 UJ_{429}	—	October 16, 2011	Kitt Peak	Spacewatch	H	340 m	MPC · JPL
590293	2011 UA_{432}	—	October 26, 2011	Haleakala	Pan-STARRS 1	·	640 m	MPC · JPL
590294	2011 UQ_{434}	—	April 4, 2014	Kitt Peak	Spacewatch	·	1.5 km	MPC · JPL
590295	2011 UM_{435}	—	October 25, 2011	Haleakala	Pan-STARRS 1	·	1.7 km	MPC · JPL
590296	2011 UA_{439}	—	August 1, 2016	Haleakala	Pan-STARRS 1	·	1.5 km	MPC · JPL
590297	2011 UP_{439}	—	October 22, 2011	Mount Lemmon	Mount Lemmon Survey	(2076)	560 m	MPC · JPL
590298	2011 UT_{439}	—	September 24, 2011	Mount Lemmon	Mount Lemmon Survey	EOS	1.4 km	MPC · JPL
590299	2011 UD_{445}	—	May 21, 2014	Haleakala	Pan-STARRS 1	·	1.6 km	MPC · JPL
590300	2011 UK_{448}	—	October 22, 2011	Mount Lemmon	Mount Lemmon Survey	·	1.7 km	MPC · JPL

== 590301–590400 ==
back to top

Designation			Discovery			Properties		Ref
Permanent	Provisional	Named after	Date	Site	Discoverer(s)	Category	Diam.	Ref
590301	2011 UA_{453}	—	October 19, 2011	Mount Lemmon	Mount Lemmon Survey	·	1.7 km	MPC · JPL
590302	2011 UE_{455}	—	October 23, 2011	Mount Lemmon	Mount Lemmon Survey	·	2.5 km	MPC · JPL
590303	2011 UC_{456}	—	October 23, 2011	Haleakala	Pan-STARRS 1	·	2.1 km	MPC · JPL
590304	2011 UW_{456}	—	October 29, 2011	Kitt Peak	Spacewatch	NEM	1.8 km	MPC · JPL
590305	2011 UV_{462}	—	October 24, 2011	Mount Lemmon	Mount Lemmon Survey	·	1.8 km	MPC · JPL
590306	2011 UQ_{471}	—	October 26, 2011	Haleakala	Pan-STARRS 1	·	1.4 km	MPC · JPL
590307	2011 UJ_{475}	—	October 20, 2011	Kitt Peak	Spacewatch	EOS	1.3 km	MPC · JPL
590308	2011 UE_{476}	—	October 23, 2011	Mount Lemmon	Mount Lemmon Survey	EOS	1.5 km	MPC · JPL
590309	2011 UF_{476}	—	October 19, 2011	Mount Lemmon	Mount Lemmon Survey	·	2.2 km	MPC · JPL
590310	2011 UG_{476}	—	October 18, 2011	Kitt Peak	Spacewatch	·	2.4 km	MPC · JPL
590311	2011 VT_{6}	—	October 21, 2011	Piszkéstető	K. Sárneczky	·	2.4 km	MPC · JPL
590312	2011 VX_{8}	—	September 24, 2011	Haleakala	Pan-STARRS 1	·	2.3 km	MPC · JPL
590313	2011 VA_{12}	—	October 31, 2011	Kitt Peak	Spacewatch	·	1.4 km	MPC · JPL
590314	2011 VD_{12}	—	December 5, 2007	Kitt Peak	Spacewatch	WIT	880 m	MPC · JPL
590315	2011 VF_{15}	—	October 31, 2011	Bergisch Gladbach	W. Bickel	EOS	1.6 km	MPC · JPL
590316	2011 VU_{25}	—	November 8, 2011	Haleakala	Pan-STARRS 1	·	2.1 km	MPC · JPL
590317	2011 VO_{29}	—	November 2, 2011	Mount Lemmon	Mount Lemmon Survey	·	1.8 km	MPC · JPL
590318	2011 VW_{29}	—	May 4, 2014	Haleakala	Pan-STARRS 1	EOS	1.5 km	MPC · JPL
590319	2011 VE_{30}	—	November 2, 2011	Mount Lemmon	Mount Lemmon Survey	·	1.7 km	MPC · JPL
590320	2011 VP_{30}	—	November 3, 2011	Kitt Peak	Spacewatch	·	2.3 km	MPC · JPL
590321	2011 VS_{30}	—	November 2, 2011	Mount Lemmon	Mount Lemmon Survey	·	2.1 km	MPC · JPL
590322	2011 WD_{1}	—	November 16, 2011	Mount Lemmon	Mount Lemmon Survey	·	580 m	MPC · JPL
590323	2011 WP_{1}	—	July 28, 2005	Palomar	NEAT	·	2.9 km	MPC · JPL
590324	2011 WX_{4}	—	December 19, 2001	Palomar	NEAT	·	2.4 km	MPC · JPL
590325	2011 WK_{8}	—	October 24, 2011	Haleakala	Pan-STARRS 1	·	810 m	MPC · JPL
590326	2011 WB_{9}	—	September 23, 2011	Mount Lemmon	Mount Lemmon Survey	LIX	2.6 km	MPC · JPL
590327	2011 WG_{18}	—	September 29, 2011	Kitt Peak	Spacewatch	·	1.5 km	MPC · JPL
590328	2011 WX_{20}	—	September 6, 2010	Piszkés-tető	K. Sárneczky, Z. Kuli	·	3.6 km	MPC · JPL
590329	2011 WN_{21}	—	September 12, 2005	Kitt Peak	Spacewatch	·	2.0 km	MPC · JPL
590330	2011 WD_{23}	—	November 17, 2011	Mount Lemmon	Mount Lemmon Survey	EOS	1.8 km	MPC · JPL
590331	2011 WE_{26}	—	November 16, 2006	Kitt Peak	Spacewatch	·	2.0 km	MPC · JPL
590332	2011 WN_{31}	—	November 22, 2011	Piszkés-tető	K. Sárneczky, A. Pál	·	1.9 km	MPC · JPL
590333	2011 WJ_{33}	—	August 29, 2005	Palomar	NEAT	EOS · fast	2.7 km	MPC · JPL
590334	2011 WH_{38}	—	November 15, 2011	Kitt Peak	Spacewatch	·	2.3 km	MPC · JPL
590335 Mikhailkuzmin	2011 WX_{46}	Mikhailkuzmin	November 3, 2011	Zelenchukskaya Stn	T. V. Krjačko, Satovski, B.	·	2.8 km	MPC · JPL
590336	2011 WH_{48}	—	October 15, 2001	Palomar	NEAT	·	570 m	MPC · JPL
590337	2011 WO_{50}	—	May 23, 2003	Kitt Peak	Spacewatch	·	3.7 km	MPC · JPL
590338	2011 WA_{67}	—	September 1, 2005	Palomar	NEAT	·	3.1 km	MPC · JPL
590339	2011 WK_{78}	—	November 19, 2011	Mount Lemmon	Mount Lemmon Survey	·	2.2 km	MPC · JPL
590340	2011 WX_{78}	—	March 31, 2003	Palomar	NEAT	·	3.3 km	MPC · JPL
590341	2011 WN_{79}	—	October 25, 2011	Haleakala	Pan-STARRS 1	·	2.5 km	MPC · JPL
590342	2011 WQ_{83}	—	October 26, 2011	Haleakala	Pan-STARRS 1	·	1.9 km	MPC · JPL
590343	2011 WP_{90}	—	April 18, 2009	Mount Lemmon	Mount Lemmon Survey	·	2.5 km	MPC · JPL
590344	2011 WM_{94}	—	November 2, 2006	Bergisch Gladbach	W. Bickel	KOR	1.1 km	MPC · JPL
590345	2011 WB_{95}	—	October 16, 2006	Catalina	CSS	·	1.6 km	MPC · JPL
590346	2011 WU_{98}	—	November 23, 2006	Kitt Peak	Spacewatch	NAE	2.0 km	MPC · JPL
590347	2011 WY_{100}	—	October 19, 2011	Mount Lemmon	Mount Lemmon Survey	·	1.9 km	MPC · JPL
590348	2011 WS_{103}	—	November 3, 2011	Mount Lemmon	Mount Lemmon Survey	·	2.8 km	MPC · JPL
590349	2011 WQ_{108}	—	October 25, 2011	Haleakala	Pan-STARRS 1	H	390 m	MPC · JPL
590350	2011 WN_{118}	—	November 18, 2011	Catalina	CSS	·	2.1 km	MPC · JPL
590351	2011 WX_{121}	—	October 21, 2011	Mount Lemmon	Mount Lemmon Survey	EOS	1.4 km	MPC · JPL
590352	2011 WV_{123}	—	November 1, 2011	Mount Lemmon	Mount Lemmon Survey	L4	10 km	MPC · JPL
590353	2011 WA_{124}	—	September 22, 1995	Kitt Peak	Spacewatch	KOR	1.7 km	MPC · JPL
590354	2011 WX_{129}	—	October 23, 2011	Haleakala	Pan-STARRS 1	·	1.5 km	MPC · JPL
590355	2011 WU_{130}	—	October 29, 2011	Kitt Peak	Spacewatch	·	2.1 km	MPC · JPL
590356	2011 WM_{134}	—	April 29, 2008	Kitt Peak	Spacewatch	·	2.6 km	MPC · JPL
590357	2011 WF_{136}	—	November 25, 2011	Haleakala	Pan-STARRS 1	·	3.2 km	MPC · JPL
590358	2011 WN_{136}	—	November 4, 2007	Kitt Peak	Spacewatch	·	1.1 km	MPC · JPL
590359	2011 WB_{140}	—	November 18, 2011	Mount Lemmon	Mount Lemmon Survey	·	1.8 km	MPC · JPL
590360	2011 WD_{140}	—	April 9, 2005	Kitt Peak	Spacewatch	·	1.0 km	MPC · JPL
590361	2011 WN_{154}	—	March 20, 2002	Socorro	LINEAR	·	2.6 km	MPC · JPL
590362	2011 WF_{155}	—	October 26, 2011	Haleakala	Pan-STARRS 1	·	2.4 km	MPC · JPL
590363	2011 WM_{157}	—	March 10, 2008	Mount Lemmon	Mount Lemmon Survey	·	2.1 km	MPC · JPL
590364	2011 WR_{157}	—	October 29, 2010	Kitt Peak	Spacewatch	L4	8.9 km	MPC · JPL
590365	2011 WF_{159}	—	October 21, 2006	Mount Lemmon	Mount Lemmon Survey	·	3.1 km	MPC · JPL
590366	2011 WU_{159}	—	November 18, 2011	Mount Lemmon	Mount Lemmon Survey	·	2.2 km	MPC · JPL
590367	2011 WZ_{162}	—	November 17, 2011	Kitt Peak	Spacewatch	·	2.8 km	MPC · JPL
590368	2011 WK_{163}	—	November 24, 2011	Haleakala	Pan-STARRS 1	·	2.5 km	MPC · JPL
590369	2011 WM_{171}	—	October 7, 2016	Haleakala	Pan-STARRS 1	EOS	1.7 km	MPC · JPL
590370	2011 WP_{174}	—	November 24, 2011	Haleakala	Pan-STARRS 1	·	2.7 km	MPC · JPL
590371	2011 XQ_{2}	—	December 1, 2011	Haleakala	Pan-STARRS 1	·	2.1 km	MPC · JPL
590372	2011 XW_{3}	—	October 13, 2005	Kitt Peak	Spacewatch	·	2.1 km	MPC · JPL
590373	2011 XS_{4}	—	February 7, 2013	Kitt Peak	Spacewatch	·	1.7 km	MPC · JPL
590374	2011 XA_{5}	—	December 1, 2011	Haleakala	Pan-STARRS 1	EOS	1.3 km	MPC · JPL
590375	2011 XW_{6}	—	December 6, 2011	Haleakala	Pan-STARRS 1	L4	6.5 km	MPC · JPL
590376	2011 YB_{1}	—	November 24, 2011	Mount Lemmon	Mount Lemmon Survey	L4	10 km	MPC · JPL
590377 Lisacampbell	2011 YG_{2}	Lisacampbell	January 21, 2007	Mauna Kea	D. D. Balam, K. M. Perrett	·	2.8 km	MPC · JPL
590378	2011 YM_{2}	—	February 7, 2002	Palomar	NEAT	·	2.4 km	MPC · JPL
590379	2011 YM_{6}	—	July 29, 2008	Mount Lemmon	Mount Lemmon Survey	L4	7.2 km	MPC · JPL
590380	2011 YD_{9}	—	July 5, 2005	Palomar	NEAT	·	1.8 km	MPC · JPL
590381	2011 YP_{11}	—	October 22, 2006	Mount Lemmon	Mount Lemmon Survey	EOS	1.9 km	MPC · JPL
590382	2011 YZ_{11}	—	January 17, 2001	Haleakala	NEAT	·	4.1 km	MPC · JPL
590383	2011 YE_{31}	—	December 26, 2011	Les Engarouines	L. Bernasconi	·	1.2 km	MPC · JPL
590384	2011 YL_{34}	—	January 7, 2005	Kitt Peak	Spacewatch	·	650 m	MPC · JPL
590385	2011 YR_{34}	—	January 30, 2001	Haleakala	NEAT	·	3.7 km	MPC · JPL
590386	2011 YD_{36}	—	December 26, 2011	Mount Lemmon	Mount Lemmon Survey	·	2.4 km	MPC · JPL
590387	2011 YX_{36}	—	February 21, 2007	Mount Lemmon	Mount Lemmon Survey	·	2.2 km	MPC · JPL
590388	2011 YW_{46}	—	December 27, 2011	Kitt Peak	Spacewatch	VER	2.3 km	MPC · JPL
590389	2011 YL_{47}	—	December 28, 2011	Oukaïmeden	M. Ory	L4	8.0 km	MPC · JPL
590390	2011 YV_{50}	—	December 29, 2011	Kitt Peak	Spacewatch	·	3.1 km	MPC · JPL
590391	2011 YJ_{52}	—	March 1, 2009	Mount Lemmon	Mount Lemmon Survey	BAP	810 m	MPC · JPL
590392	2011 YA_{53}	—	November 27, 2011	Mount Lemmon	Mount Lemmon Survey	·	690 m	MPC · JPL
590393	2011 YX_{54}	—	January 27, 2007	Mount Lemmon	Mount Lemmon Survey	·	2.5 km	MPC · JPL
590394	2011 YR_{57}	—	May 1, 2008	Kitt Peak	Spacewatch	EOS	2.0 km	MPC · JPL
590395	2011 YN_{62}	—	June 4, 2005	Kitt Peak	Spacewatch	H	560 m	MPC · JPL
590396	2011 YB_{65}	—	October 3, 2006	Mount Lemmon	Mount Lemmon Survey	·	1.8 km	MPC · JPL
590397	2011 YX_{67}	—	July 5, 2003	Kitt Peak	Spacewatch	·	5.3 km	MPC · JPL
590398	2011 YX_{68}	—	November 1, 2005	Mount Lemmon	Mount Lemmon Survey	·	3.1 km	MPC · JPL
590399	2011 YP_{70}	—	December 16, 2011	Mount Lemmon	Mount Lemmon Survey	·	2.2 km	MPC · JPL
590400	2011 YX_{71}	—	December 1, 2011	Charleston	R. Holmes	·	630 m	MPC · JPL

== 590401–590500 ==
back to top

Designation			Discovery			Properties		Ref
Permanent	Provisional	Named after	Date	Site	Discoverer(s)	Category	Diam.	Ref
590401	2011 YK_{72}	—	December 29, 2011	Kitt Peak	Spacewatch	L4	10 km	MPC · JPL
590402	2011 YO_{74}	—	December 28, 2011	Catalina	CSS	·	840 m	MPC · JPL
590403	2011 YJ_{78}	—	January 4, 2012	Mount Lemmon	Mount Lemmon Survey	·	940 m	MPC · JPL
590404	2011 YP_{79}	—	January 10, 2013	Haleakala	Pan-STARRS 1	L4	7.9 km	MPC · JPL
590405	2011 YH_{81}	—	December 26, 2011	Kitt Peak	Spacewatch	V	500 m	MPC · JPL
590406	2011 YO_{81}	—	November 10, 2016	Mount Lemmon	Mount Lemmon Survey	·	2.8 km	MPC · JPL
590407	2011 YD_{82}	—	May 6, 2014	Haleakala	Pan-STARRS 1	VER	2.3 km	MPC · JPL
590408	2011 YK_{82}	—	December 27, 2011	Mount Lemmon	Mount Lemmon Survey	EUP	2.5 km	MPC · JPL
590409	2011 YF_{83}	—	December 30, 2011	Mount Lemmon	Mount Lemmon Survey	·	2.1 km	MPC · JPL
590410	2011 YG_{83}	—	December 24, 2011	Mount Lemmon	Mount Lemmon Survey	·	2.0 km	MPC · JPL
590411	2011 YH_{84}	—	October 13, 2016	Mount Lemmon	Mount Lemmon Survey	·	2.9 km	MPC · JPL
590412	2011 YS_{84}	—	September 8, 2016	Haleakala	Pan-STARRS 1	·	2.7 km	MPC · JPL
590413	2011 YZ_{84}	—	January 18, 2016	Haleakala	Pan-STARRS 1	V	430 m	MPC · JPL
590414	2011 YF_{88}	—	December 29, 2011	Mount Lemmon	Mount Lemmon Survey	L4 · HEK	8.8 km	MPC · JPL
590415	2011 YS_{88}	—	June 30, 2013	Haleakala	Pan-STARRS 1	H	450 m	MPC · JPL
590416	2011 YV_{88}	—	July 24, 2015	Haleakala	Pan-STARRS 1	·	1.6 km	MPC · JPL
590417	2011 YY_{88}	—	December 24, 2011	Mount Lemmon	Mount Lemmon Survey	L4	9.0 km	MPC · JPL
590418	2011 YH_{89}	—	December 27, 2011	Kitt Peak	Spacewatch	L4	9.2 km	MPC · JPL
590419	2011 YA_{90}	—	June 18, 2018	Haleakala	Pan-STARRS 1	L4	7.4 km	MPC · JPL
590420	2011 YF_{90}	—	December 28, 2011	Kitt Peak	Spacewatch	·	2.8 km	MPC · JPL
590421	2011 YP_{90}	—	December 31, 2011	Kitt Peak	Spacewatch	L4 · ERY	6.6 km	MPC · JPL
590422	2011 YK_{91}	—	December 26, 2011	Kitt Peak	Spacewatch	L4	7.3 km	MPC · JPL
590423	2011 YX_{91}	—	December 29, 2011	Mount Lemmon	Mount Lemmon Survey	·	4.2 km	MPC · JPL
590424	2011 YA_{92}	—	December 29, 2011	Mount Lemmon	Mount Lemmon Survey	EOS	1.9 km	MPC · JPL
590425	2011 YB_{93}	—	December 26, 2011	Kitt Peak	Spacewatch	EOS	1.7 km	MPC · JPL
590426	2011 YF_{94}	—	December 27, 2011	Mount Lemmon	Mount Lemmon Survey	L4	7.5 km	MPC · JPL
590427	2012 AD_{4}	—	January 1, 2012	Mount Lemmon	Mount Lemmon Survey	·	3.1 km	MPC · JPL
590428	2012 AZ_{4}	—	December 21, 2011	ESA OGS	ESA OGS	·	2.6 km	MPC · JPL
590429	2012 AM_{5}	—	December 7, 2005	Kitt Peak	Spacewatch	VER	2.7 km	MPC · JPL
590430	2012 AV_{7}	—	September 9, 2008	Mount Lemmon	Mount Lemmon Survey	L4	8.2 km	MPC · JPL
590431	2012 AQ_{8}	—	January 2, 2012	Kitt Peak	Spacewatch	·	3.4 km	MPC · JPL
590432	2012 AX_{11}	—	January 1, 2012	Mount Lemmon	Mount Lemmon Survey	·	2.7 km	MPC · JPL
590433	2012 AN_{12}	—	January 5, 2012	Kitt Peak	Spacewatch	LIX	3.0 km	MPC · JPL
590434	2012 AJ_{15}	—	November 2, 2000	Kitt Peak	Spacewatch	·	850 m	MPC · JPL
590435	2012 AJ_{16}	—	December 27, 2011	Mount Lemmon	Mount Lemmon Survey	L4	8.5 km	MPC · JPL
590436	2012 AU_{19}	—	November 2, 2007	Mount Lemmon	Mount Lemmon Survey	·	1.0 km	MPC · JPL
590437	2012 AA_{20}	—	January 2, 2012	Kitt Peak	Spacewatch	EOS	1.9 km	MPC · JPL
590438	2012 AU_{21}	—	January 3, 2012	Mount Lemmon	Mount Lemmon Survey	L4	8.5 km	MPC · JPL
590439	2012 AH_{22}	—	September 18, 2003	Palomar	NEAT	·	1.3 km	MPC · JPL
590440	2012 AT_{23}	—	October 31, 2005	Catalina	CSS	·	3.1 km	MPC · JPL
590441	2012 AC_{26}	—	October 9, 2016	Haleakala	Pan-STARRS 1	TIR	2.9 km	MPC · JPL
590442	2012 AE_{26}	—	June 5, 2014	Haleakala	Pan-STARRS 1	·	2.2 km	MPC · JPL
590443	2012 AM_{26}	—	October 21, 2016	Mount Lemmon	Mount Lemmon Survey	(1118)	2.6 km	MPC · JPL
590444	2012 AD_{29}	—	January 2, 2012	Kitt Peak	Spacewatch	URS	2.5 km	MPC · JPL
590445	2012 AD_{31}	—	January 2, 2012	Kitt Peak	Spacewatch	·	2.3 km	MPC · JPL
590446	2012 AW_{31}	—	January 1, 2012	Mount Lemmon	Mount Lemmon Survey	EOS	2.0 km	MPC · JPL
590447	2012 AE_{33}	—	January 1, 2012	Mount Lemmon	Mount Lemmon Survey	·	900 m	MPC · JPL
590448	2012 BE_{19}	—	October 25, 2011	Mount Lemmon	Mount Lemmon Survey	TIR	3.4 km	MPC · JPL
590449	2012 BX_{19}	—	January 19, 2012	Haleakala	Pan-STARRS 1	H	440 m	MPC · JPL
590450	2012 BY_{23}	—	December 27, 2011	Kitt Peak	Spacewatch	L4	7.6 km	MPC · JPL
590451	2012 BR_{28}	—	September 18, 2010	Mount Lemmon	Mount Lemmon Survey	EOS	1.8 km	MPC · JPL
590452	2012 BU_{30}	—	November 23, 2006	Mount Lemmon	Mount Lemmon Survey	·	3.5 km	MPC · JPL
590453	2012 BE_{34}	—	February 10, 2007	Mount Lemmon	Mount Lemmon Survey	EOS	2.3 km	MPC · JPL
590454	2012 BJ_{34}	—	November 26, 2005	Catalina	CSS	·	2.3 km	MPC · JPL
590455	2012 BV_{35}	—	August 31, 2005	Palomar	NEAT	·	2.5 km	MPC · JPL
590456	2012 BR_{36}	—	January 2, 2012	Mount Lemmon	Mount Lemmon Survey	·	3.3 km	MPC · JPL
590457	2012 BS_{39}	—	May 31, 2003	Cerro Tololo	Deep Ecliptic Survey	·	2.6 km	MPC · JPL
590458	2012 BN_{44}	—	January 3, 2012	Kitt Peak	Spacewatch	·	1.0 km	MPC · JPL
590459	2012 BE_{47}	—	January 19, 2012	Mount Lemmon	Mount Lemmon Survey	·	780 m	MPC · JPL
590460	2012 BX_{49}	—	December 27, 2011	Mount Lemmon	Mount Lemmon Survey	L4	5.6 km	MPC · JPL
590461	2012 BB_{54}	—	September 4, 2010	Mount Lemmon	Mount Lemmon Survey	·	1.1 km	MPC · JPL
590462	2012 BD_{55}	—	November 1, 1999	Kitt Peak	Spacewatch	·	1.3 km	MPC · JPL
590463	2012 BU_{56}	—	January 4, 2012	Mount Lemmon	Mount Lemmon Survey	·	3.2 km	MPC · JPL
590464 Helenlawson	2012 BB_{57}	Helenlawson	January 23, 2012	Mayhill	Falla, N.	·	1.7 km	MPC · JPL
590465	2012 BW_{60}	—	January 24, 2012	Haleakala	Pan-STARRS 1	L4	7.5 km	MPC · JPL
590466	2012 BK_{61}	—	September 30, 2009	Mount Lemmon	Mount Lemmon Survey	L4	7.1 km	MPC · JPL
590467	2012 BK_{64}	—	January 20, 2012	Mount Lemmon	Mount Lemmon Survey	·	3.0 km	MPC · JPL
590468	2012 BG_{68}	—	January 21, 2012	Kitt Peak	Spacewatch	·	700 m	MPC · JPL
590469	2012 BL_{68}	—	January 21, 2012	Kitt Peak	Spacewatch	EOS	2.0 km	MPC · JPL
590470	2012 BR_{71}	—	January 21, 2012	Catalina	CSS	·	520 m	MPC · JPL
590471	2012 BO_{72}	—	September 19, 2010	Mount Lemmon	Mount Lemmon Survey	·	1.0 km	MPC · JPL
590472	2012 BM_{74}	—	January 23, 2012	Oukaïmeden	M. Ory	·	2.8 km	MPC · JPL
590473	2012 BG_{76}	—	January 18, 2008	Mount Lemmon	Mount Lemmon Survey	·	1.3 km	MPC · JPL
590474	2012 BF_{80}	—	September 25, 2007	Mount Lemmon	Mount Lemmon Survey	·	660 m	MPC · JPL
590475	2012 BE_{81}	—	March 18, 2001	Kitt Peak	Spacewatch	MAS	610 m	MPC · JPL
590476	2012 BH_{82}	—	January 27, 2012	Mount Lemmon	Mount Lemmon Survey	·	810 m	MPC · JPL
590477	2012 BK_{83}	—	January 27, 2012	Mount Lemmon	Mount Lemmon Survey	·	2.1 km	MPC · JPL
590478	2012 BB_{84}	—	January 27, 2012	Mount Lemmon	Mount Lemmon Survey	EOS	1.9 km	MPC · JPL
590479	2012 BN_{85}	—	January 18, 2012	Bergisch Gladbach	W. Bickel	·	2.3 km	MPC · JPL
590480	2012 BT_{85}	—	April 20, 2002	Palomar	NEAT	H	620 m	MPC · JPL
590481	2012 BH_{90}	—	December 29, 2011	Kitt Peak	Spacewatch	VER	2.3 km	MPC · JPL
590482	2012 BC_{94}	—	January 27, 2012	Kitt Peak	Spacewatch	·	2.7 km	MPC · JPL
590483	2012 BX_{96}	—	December 2, 2010	Mount Lemmon	Mount Lemmon Survey	L4	6.8 km	MPC · JPL
590484	2012 BB_{97}	—	December 24, 2011	Mount Lemmon	Mount Lemmon Survey	H	460 m	MPC · JPL
590485	2012 BO_{97}	—	September 2, 2008	Kitt Peak	Spacewatch	L4	6.3 km	MPC · JPL
590486	2012 BD_{99}	—	January 26, 2012	Haleakala	Pan-STARRS 1	·	2.4 km	MPC · JPL
590487	2012 BS_{100}	—	January 27, 2012	Kitt Peak	Spacewatch	NYS	880 m	MPC · JPL
590488	2012 BQ_{101}	—	January 27, 2012	Mount Lemmon	Mount Lemmon Survey	·	2.6 km	MPC · JPL
590489	2012 BC_{111}	—	January 27, 2012	Mount Lemmon	Mount Lemmon Survey	·	1.0 km	MPC · JPL
590490	2012 BT_{115}	—	January 27, 2012	Mount Lemmon	Mount Lemmon Survey	NYS	970 m	MPC · JPL
590491	2012 BW_{116}	—	January 27, 2012	Mount Lemmon	Mount Lemmon Survey	·	680 m	MPC · JPL
590492	2012 BH_{118}	—	January 27, 2012	Mount Lemmon	Mount Lemmon Survey	L4	6.3 km	MPC · JPL
590493	2012 BT_{119}	—	January 27, 2012	Mount Lemmon	Mount Lemmon Survey	·	3.0 km	MPC · JPL
590494	2012 BV_{123}	—	January 28, 2012	Haleakala	Pan-STARRS 1	L4	7.6 km	MPC · JPL
590495	2012 BP_{124}	—	January 29, 2012	Kitt Peak	Spacewatch	·	820 m	MPC · JPL
590496	2012 BM_{126}	—	October 11, 2010	Mount Lemmon	Mount Lemmon Survey	·	2.7 km	MPC · JPL
590497	2012 BX_{128}	—	December 27, 2011	Mount Lemmon	Mount Lemmon Survey	AEG	2.3 km	MPC · JPL
590498	2012 BM_{129}	—	January 30, 2012	Kitt Peak	Spacewatch	MAS	560 m	MPC · JPL
590499	2012 BD_{131}	—	January 18, 2004	Palomar	NEAT	H	620 m	MPC · JPL
590500	2012 BF_{131}	—	January 25, 2012	Haleakala	Pan-STARRS 1	H	530 m	MPC · JPL

== 590501–590600 ==
back to top

Designation			Discovery			Properties		Ref
Permanent	Provisional	Named after	Date	Site	Discoverer(s)	Category	Diam.	Ref
590501	2012 BZ_{132}	—	November 15, 2003	Kitt Peak	Spacewatch	·	1.4 km	MPC · JPL
590502	2012 BK_{137}	—	January 26, 2012	Mount Lemmon	Mount Lemmon Survey	NYS	790 m	MPC · JPL
590503	2012 BL_{140}	—	January 1, 2012	Mount Lemmon	Mount Lemmon Survey	NYS	830 m	MPC · JPL
590504	2012 BH_{141}	—	September 19, 2010	Kitt Peak	Spacewatch	·	2.7 km	MPC · JPL
590505	2012 BL_{144}	—	January 26, 2012	Mount Lemmon	Mount Lemmon Survey	·	2.8 km	MPC · JPL
590506	2012 BK_{145}	—	November 13, 2007	Mount Lemmon	Mount Lemmon Survey	(2076)	750 m	MPC · JPL
590507	2012 BC_{148}	—	January 20, 2012	Kitt Peak	Spacewatch	MIS	1.5 km	MPC · JPL
590508	2012 BX_{151}	—	October 13, 2010	Mount Lemmon	Mount Lemmon Survey	·	3.3 km	MPC · JPL
590509	2012 BS_{156}	—	January 8, 2006	Kitt Peak	Spacewatch	·	2.4 km	MPC · JPL
590510	2012 BR_{159}	—	February 21, 2007	Mount Lemmon	Mount Lemmon Survey	EOS	2.0 km	MPC · JPL
590511	2012 BL_{160}	—	January 26, 2012	Mount Lemmon	Mount Lemmon Survey	·	2.7 km	MPC · JPL
590512	2012 BS_{160}	—	January 19, 2012	Kitt Peak	Spacewatch	·	2.6 km	MPC · JPL
590513	2012 BJ_{161}	—	April 14, 2013	Mount Lemmon	Mount Lemmon Survey	·	2.3 km	MPC · JPL
590514	2012 BQ_{162}	—	October 7, 2016	Haleakala	Pan-STARRS 1	·	2.4 km	MPC · JPL
590515	2012 BX_{162}	—	January 18, 2012	Catalina	CSS	·	2.9 km	MPC · JPL
590516	2012 BP_{164}	—	February 13, 2008	Mount Lemmon	Mount Lemmon Survey	·	660 m	MPC · JPL
590517	2012 BT_{166}	—	November 25, 2016	Mount Lemmon	Mount Lemmon Survey	·	2.5 km	MPC · JPL
590518	2012 BA_{169}	—	August 11, 2015	Haleakala	Pan-STARRS 1	(22805)	3.0 km	MPC · JPL
590519	2012 BL_{169}	—	January 27, 2012	Mount Lemmon	Mount Lemmon Survey	ELF	2.7 km	MPC · JPL
590520	2012 BX_{171}	—	December 2, 2016	Mount Lemmon	Mount Lemmon Survey	·	2.5 km	MPC · JPL
590521	2012 BD_{173}	—	November 5, 2016	Mount Lemmon	Mount Lemmon Survey	H	380 m	MPC · JPL
590522	2012 BM_{174}	—	December 30, 2011	Kitt Peak	Spacewatch	·	1.0 km	MPC · JPL
590523	2012 BJ_{176}	—	January 18, 2012	Kitt Peak	Spacewatch	·	2.7 km	MPC · JPL
590524	2012 BQ_{179}	—	January 27, 2012	Mount Lemmon	Mount Lemmon Survey	L4	6.5 km	MPC · JPL
590525	2012 BD_{180}	—	January 30, 2012	Mount Lemmon	Mount Lemmon Survey	L4	7.6 km	MPC · JPL
590526	2012 BT_{180}	—	January 21, 2012	Kitt Peak	Spacewatch	·	2.3 km	MPC · JPL
590527	2012 CD_{3}	—	October 29, 2005	Kitt Peak	Spacewatch	·	2.3 km	MPC · JPL
590528	2012 CP_{11}	—	February 3, 2012	Haleakala	Pan-STARRS 1	NYS	1.0 km	MPC · JPL
590529	2012 CT_{12}	—	February 3, 2012	Haleakala	Pan-STARRS 1	MAS	670 m	MPC · JPL
590530	2012 CV_{15}	—	January 21, 2012	Kitt Peak	Spacewatch	·	3.1 km	MPC · JPL
590531	2012 CR_{18}	—	November 30, 2000	Apache Point	SDSS Collaboration	·	3.5 km	MPC · JPL
590532	2012 CM_{19}	—	February 12, 2012	Haleakala	Pan-STARRS 1	H	410 m	MPC · JPL
590533	2012 CZ_{24}	—	January 19, 2012	Haleakala	Pan-STARRS 1	·	2.3 km	MPC · JPL
590534	2012 CQ_{28}	—	February 13, 2012	Haleakala	Pan-STARRS 1	·	1.1 km	MPC · JPL
590535	2012 CQ_{31}	—	January 21, 2012	Kitt Peak	Spacewatch	·	2.3 km	MPC · JPL
590536	2012 CR_{31}	—	January 26, 2012	Haleakala	Pan-STARRS 1	·	630 m	MPC · JPL
590537	2012 CC_{32}	—	January 29, 2012	Kitt Peak	Spacewatch	·	760 m	MPC · JPL
590538	2012 CD_{37}	—	January 21, 2012	Kitt Peak	Spacewatch	·	2.4 km	MPC · JPL
590539	2012 CJ_{37}	—	October 9, 2007	Kitt Peak	Spacewatch	·	730 m	MPC · JPL
590540	2012 CL_{37}	—	February 17, 2007	Kitt Peak	Spacewatch	VER	2.8 km	MPC · JPL
590541	2012 CH_{45}	—	April 24, 2001	Kitt Peak	Spacewatch	MAS	920 m	MPC · JPL
590542	2012 CO_{45}	—	October 22, 2005	Kitt Peak	Spacewatch	AGN	1.3 km	MPC · JPL
590543	2012 CL_{49}	—	February 13, 2012	Haleakala	Pan-STARRS 1	EOS	1.9 km	MPC · JPL
590544	2012 CR_{54}	—	January 1, 2008	Kitt Peak	Spacewatch	·	1.2 km	MPC · JPL
590545	2012 CT_{60}	—	February 11, 2012	Mount Lemmon	Mount Lemmon Survey	·	920 m	MPC · JPL
590546	2012 CJ_{61}	—	January 18, 2016	Haleakala	Pan-STARRS 1	·	1.3 km	MPC · JPL
590547	2012 CP_{63}	—	October 3, 2015	Mount Lemmon	Mount Lemmon Survey	(1298)	2.5 km	MPC · JPL
590548	2012 CT_{65}	—	February 14, 2012	Haleakala	Pan-STARRS 1	·	2.1 km	MPC · JPL
590549	2012 CK_{67}	—	February 1, 2012	Mount Lemmon	Mount Lemmon Survey	·	2.5 km	MPC · JPL
590550	2012 DJ_{3}	—	January 19, 2012	Haleakala	Pan-STARRS 1	·	2.0 km	MPC · JPL
590551	2012 DY_{15}	—	February 21, 2012	Oukaïmeden	M. Ory	·	4.0 km	MPC · JPL
590552	2012 DJ_{19}	—	February 21, 2012	Kitt Peak	Spacewatch	H	440 m	MPC · JPL
590553	2012 DN_{30}	—	February 22, 2012	Charleston	R. Holmes	H	510 m	MPC · JPL
590554	2012 DA_{34}	—	January 25, 2012	Kitt Peak	Spacewatch	·	2.2 km	MPC · JPL
590555	2012 DB_{49}	—	January 20, 2012	Haleakala	Pan-STARRS 1	H	360 m	MPC · JPL
590556	2012 DD_{59}	—	February 21, 2012	Mayhill-ISON	L. Elenin	·	1.0 km	MPC · JPL
590557	2012 DL_{61}	—	January 29, 2012	Haleakala	Pan-STARRS 1	H	550 m	MPC · JPL
590558	2012 DR_{62}	—	September 3, 2005	Palomar	NEAT	H	540 m	MPC · JPL
590559	2012 DP_{71}	—	September 24, 2009	Mount Lemmon	Mount Lemmon Survey	·	2.7 km	MPC · JPL
590560	2012 DC_{73}	—	September 17, 2003	Kitt Peak	Spacewatch	·	760 m	MPC · JPL
590561	2012 DX_{80}	—	November 19, 2003	Kitt Peak	Spacewatch	NYS	920 m	MPC · JPL
590562	2012 DZ_{80}	—	February 26, 2012	Haleakala	Pan-STARRS 1	PHO	850 m	MPC · JPL
590563	2012 DO_{90}	—	March 12, 2007	Kitt Peak	Spacewatch	·	1.1 km	MPC · JPL
590564	2012 DP_{99}	—	September 2, 2010	Mount Lemmon	Mount Lemmon Survey	H	450 m	MPC · JPL
590565	2012 DH_{100}	—	February 10, 2012	Mount Lemmon	Mount Lemmon Survey	·	1.1 km	MPC · JPL
590566	2012 DS_{104}	—	February 27, 2012	Haleakala	Pan-STARRS 1	EUP	2.6 km	MPC · JPL
590567	2012 DB_{107}	—	April 12, 2013	Haleakala	Pan-STARRS 1	·	3.2 km	MPC · JPL
590568	2012 DQ_{107}	—	February 16, 2012	Mayhill-ISON	L. Elenin	·	2.9 km	MPC · JPL
590569	2012 DH_{110}	—	February 21, 2012	Kitt Peak	Spacewatch	H	400 m	MPC · JPL
590570	2012 DJ_{117}	—	February 16, 2012	Haleakala	Pan-STARRS 1	·	2.3 km	MPC · JPL
590571	2012 DK_{119}	—	February 24, 2012	Mount Lemmon	Mount Lemmon Survey	·	2.6 km	MPC · JPL
590572	2012 DL_{119}	—	February 19, 2012	Kitt Peak	Spacewatch	EOS	1.7 km	MPC · JPL
590573	2012 DO_{123}	—	February 26, 2012	Mount Lemmon	Mount Lemmon Survey	·	1.0 km	MPC · JPL
590574	2012 DF_{124}	—	February 23, 2012	Kitt Peak	Spacewatch	·	2.5 km	MPC · JPL
590575	2012 ET	—	August 16, 2009	Kitt Peak	Spacewatch	·	3.3 km	MPC · JPL
590576	2012 EC_{9}	—	February 13, 2012	Kitt Peak	Spacewatch	H	390 m	MPC · JPL
590577	2012 EB_{14}	—	October 2, 2006	Mount Lemmon	Mount Lemmon Survey	·	1.2 km	MPC · JPL
590578	2012 EB_{15}	—	March 17, 2004	Palomar	NEAT	H	490 m	MPC · JPL
590579	2012 ES_{15}	—	March 15, 2012	Piszkés-tető	K. Sárneczky, S. Kürti	·	3.1 km	MPC · JPL
590580	2012 EP_{20}	—	August 30, 2013	Haleakala	Pan-STARRS 1	·	1.1 km	MPC · JPL
590581	2012 EH_{22}	—	January 16, 2000	Kitt Peak	Spacewatch	·	3.3 km	MPC · JPL
590582	2012 FD	—	March 16, 2012	Catalina	CSS	H	470 m	MPC · JPL
590583	2012 FS_{5}	—	January 27, 2012	Kitt Peak	Spacewatch	·	3.6 km	MPC · JPL
590584	2012 FY_{10}	—	December 3, 2010	Mount Lemmon	Mount Lemmon Survey	·	1.3 km	MPC · JPL
590585	2012 FF_{18}	—	September 15, 2009	Kitt Peak	Spacewatch	KOR	1.3 km	MPC · JPL
590586	2012 FS_{21}	—	March 17, 2012	Mount Lemmon	Mount Lemmon Survey	·	1.8 km	MPC · JPL
590587	2012 FH_{23}	—	March 21, 2012	Haleakala	Pan-STARRS 1	H	420 m	MPC · JPL
590588	2012 FZ_{25}	—	February 10, 2008	Kitt Peak	Spacewatch	PHO	780 m	MPC · JPL
590589	2012 FG_{34}	—	April 9, 2008	Mount Lemmon	Mount Lemmon Survey	·	700 m	MPC · JPL
590590	2012 FZ_{37}	—	March 25, 2012	Mount Lemmon	Mount Lemmon Survey	·	1.3 km	MPC · JPL
590591	2012 FC_{38}	—	January 10, 2008	Mount Lemmon	Mount Lemmon Survey	·	1.3 km	MPC · JPL
590592	2012 FJ_{41}	—	February 26, 2012	Kitt Peak	Spacewatch	·	870 m	MPC · JPL
590593	2012 FZ_{65}	—	February 28, 2012	Haleakala	Pan-STARRS 1	·	670 m	MPC · JPL
590594	2012 FZ_{69}	—	August 29, 2005	Kitt Peak	Spacewatch	·	970 m	MPC · JPL
590595	2012 FT_{78}	—	October 23, 2001	Palomar	NEAT	·	1.5 km	MPC · JPL
590596	2012 FH_{83}	—	September 27, 2003	Kitt Peak	Spacewatch	V	700 m	MPC · JPL
590597	2012 FR_{84}	—	February 26, 2012	Kitt Peak	Spacewatch	H	470 m	MPC · JPL
590598	2012 FZ_{86}	—	April 3, 2008	Mount Lemmon	Mount Lemmon Survey	·	800 m	MPC · JPL
590599	2012 FO_{88}	—	March 29, 2012	Kitt Peak	Spacewatch	·	2.4 km	MPC · JPL
590600	2012 FH_{89}	—	March 17, 2012	Kitt Peak	Spacewatch	H	440 m	MPC · JPL

== 590601–590700 ==
back to top

Designation			Discovery			Properties		Ref
Permanent	Provisional	Named after	Date	Site	Discoverer(s)	Category	Diam.	Ref
590601	2012 FU_{93}	—	March 17, 2012	Mount Lemmon	Mount Lemmon Survey	·	2.9 km	MPC · JPL
590602	2012 FC_{103}	—	March 16, 2012	Haleakala	Pan-STARRS 1	·	3.0 km	MPC · JPL
590603	2012 GU	—	September 3, 2005	Palomar	NEAT	H	480 m	MPC · JPL
590604	2012 GV	—	March 16, 2012	Haleakala	Pan-STARRS 1	H	440 m	MPC · JPL
590605	2012 GO_{24}	—	March 16, 2012	Catalina	CSS	·	3.2 km	MPC · JPL
590606	2012 GZ_{31}	—	March 30, 2012	Siding Spring	SSS	·	4.2 km	MPC · JPL
590607	2012 HB_{12}	—	January 17, 2004	Palomar	NEAT	PHO	1.2 km	MPC · JPL
590608	2012 HW_{20}	—	April 25, 2012	Haleakala	Pan-STARRS 1	·	980 m	MPC · JPL
590609	2012 HQ_{35}	—	April 27, 2012	Kitt Peak	Spacewatch	EUN	1.0 km	MPC · JPL
590610	2012 HP_{38}	—	April 20, 2012	Mount Lemmon	Mount Lemmon Survey	·	1.1 km	MPC · JPL
590611	2012 HJ_{48}	—	May 28, 2004	Kitt Peak	Spacewatch	H	510 m	MPC · JPL
590612	2012 HL_{50}	—	March 28, 2012	Haleakala	Pan-STARRS 1	H	480 m	MPC · JPL
590613	2012 HG_{56}	—	October 24, 2009	Kitt Peak	Spacewatch	·	2.5 km	MPC · JPL
590614	2012 HC_{72}	—	April 24, 2012	Haleakala	Pan-STARRS 1	H	550 m	MPC · JPL
590615	2012 HE_{77}	—	April 28, 2012	Kitt Peak	Spacewatch	·	950 m	MPC · JPL
590616	2012 HU_{84}	—	March 8, 2005	Mount Lemmon	Mount Lemmon Survey	·	3.3 km	MPC · JPL
590617	2012 HD_{87}	—	April 28, 2012	Mount Lemmon	Mount Lemmon Survey	·	840 m	MPC · JPL
590618	2012 HU_{88}	—	September 10, 2015	Haleakala	Pan-STARRS 1	T_{j} (2.98) · EUP	3.2 km	MPC · JPL
590619	2012 HJ_{90}	—	April 23, 2012	Kitt Peak	Spacewatch	·	790 m	MPC · JPL
590620	2012 HZ_{99}	—	April 16, 2012	Kitt Peak	Spacewatch	·	820 m	MPC · JPL
590621	2012 HR_{100}	—	April 27, 2012	Haleakala	Pan-STARRS 1	PHO	790 m	MPC · JPL
590622	2012 HT_{107}	—	February 7, 2011	Mount Lemmon	Mount Lemmon Survey	EOS	1.3 km	MPC · JPL
590623	2012 JD_{10}	—	April 30, 2012	Kitt Peak	Spacewatch	·	1.1 km	MPC · JPL
590624	2012 JZ_{10}	—	February 20, 2004	Bergisch Gladbach	W. Bickel	PHO	910 m	MPC · JPL
590625	2012 JB_{15}	—	May 12, 2012	Mount Lemmon	Mount Lemmon Survey	·	940 m	MPC · JPL
590626	2012 JB_{21}	—	May 1, 2012	Mount Lemmon	Mount Lemmon Survey	·	1.8 km	MPC · JPL
590627	2012 JU_{26}	—	May 29, 1998	Kitt Peak	Spacewatch	H	500 m	MPC · JPL
590628	2012 JT_{33}	—	April 21, 2012	Mount Lemmon	Mount Lemmon Survey	·	1.2 km	MPC · JPL
590629	2012 JM_{35}	—	May 15, 2012	Mount Lemmon	Mount Lemmon Survey	·	1.1 km	MPC · JPL
590630	2012 JR_{43}	—	May 15, 2012	Mount Lemmon	Mount Lemmon Survey	·	1.1 km	MPC · JPL
590631	2012 JL_{45}	—	May 15, 2012	Haleakala	Pan-STARRS 1	·	950 m	MPC · JPL
590632	2012 JH_{50}	—	May 14, 2012	Haleakala	Pan-STARRS 1	·	880 m	MPC · JPL
590633	2012 JL_{63}	—	September 27, 2009	Kitt Peak	Spacewatch	·	690 m	MPC · JPL
590634	2012 KL	—	August 4, 2008	Črni Vrh	Skvarč, J.	·	1.6 km	MPC · JPL
590635	2012 KJ_{2}	—	May 16, 2012	Haleakala	Pan-STARRS 1	·	950 m	MPC · JPL
590636	2012 KC_{9}	—	January 5, 2006	Mount Lemmon	Mount Lemmon Survey	H	600 m	MPC · JPL
590637	2012 KS_{9}	—	May 16, 2012	Kitt Peak	Spacewatch	·	1.0 km	MPC · JPL
590638	2012 KE_{17}	—	December 12, 2006	Mount Lemmon	Mount Lemmon Survey	·	1.1 km	MPC · JPL
590639	2012 KV_{24}	—	May 19, 2012	Charleston	R. Holmes	·	990 m	MPC · JPL
590640	2012 KL_{27}	—	January 19, 2007	Mauna Kea	P. A. Wiegert	·	730 m	MPC · JPL
590641	2012 KF_{33}	—	May 16, 2012	Mount Lemmon	Mount Lemmon Survey	·	960 m	MPC · JPL
590642	2012 KR_{37}	—	April 30, 2008	Kitt Peak	Spacewatch	·	700 m	MPC · JPL
590643	2012 KW_{37}	—	July 31, 2005	Palomar	NEAT	·	1.1 km	MPC · JPL
590644	2012 KC_{46}	—	December 2, 2010	Kitt Peak	Spacewatch	·	1.5 km	MPC · JPL
590645	2012 KC_{53}	—	May 18, 2012	Mount Lemmon	Mount Lemmon Survey	·	1.3 km	MPC · JPL
590646	2012 KE_{60}	—	May 19, 2012	Mount Lemmon	Mount Lemmon Survey	BRG	1.4 km	MPC · JPL
590647	2012 LH_{6}	—	January 28, 2007	Mount Lemmon	Mount Lemmon Survey	·	1.2 km	MPC · JPL
590648	2012 LE_{14}	—	November 22, 2009	Kitt Peak	Spacewatch	ADE	2.0 km	MPC · JPL
590649	2012 LP_{15}	—	September 27, 2008	Mount Lemmon	Mount Lemmon Survey	·	1.2 km	MPC · JPL
590650	2012 LR_{20}	—	June 10, 2012	Mount Lemmon	Mount Lemmon Survey	·	970 m	MPC · JPL
590651	2012 LE_{21}	—	November 24, 2009	Kitt Peak	Spacewatch	MAR	1.2 km	MPC · JPL
590652	2012 LH_{21}	—	March 29, 2003	Anderson Mesa	LONEOS	ADE	1.8 km	MPC · JPL
590653	2012 LU_{22}	—	April 21, 2012	Mount Lemmon	Mount Lemmon Survey	·	1.2 km	MPC · JPL
590654	2012 LU_{24}	—	June 15, 2012	Mount Lemmon	Mount Lemmon Survey	BRG	940 m	MPC · JPL
590655	2012 LV_{24}	—	May 19, 2005	Mount Lemmon	Mount Lemmon Survey	·	890 m	MPC · JPL
590656	2012 LF_{27}	—	November 10, 2013	Mount Lemmon	Mount Lemmon Survey	KON	1.9 km	MPC · JPL
590657	2012 MM_{1}	—	June 17, 2012	Mount Lemmon	Mount Lemmon Survey	·	1.1 km	MPC · JPL
590658	2012 MF_{5}	—	May 16, 2012	Haleakala	Pan-STARRS 1	MAR	800 m	MPC · JPL
590659	2012 MW_{7}	—	December 19, 2001	Palomar	NEAT	(5)	1.8 km	MPC · JPL
590660	2012 MY_{9}	—	May 29, 2012	Mount Lemmon	Mount Lemmon Survey	·	1.3 km	MPC · JPL
590661	2012 MO_{10}	—	December 9, 2010	Mount Lemmon	Mount Lemmon Survey	·	1.8 km	MPC · JPL
590662	2012 MU_{16}	—	October 1, 2008	Catalina	CSS	·	1.4 km	MPC · JPL
590663	2012 MY_{16}	—	June 21, 2012	Mount Lemmon	Mount Lemmon Survey	·	2.2 km	MPC · JPL
590664	2012 OV	—	November 11, 2001	Apache Point	SDSS Collaboration	·	1.2 km	MPC · JPL
590665	2012 OH_{1}	—	June 16, 1999	Wise	Wise	·	1.6 km	MPC · JPL
590666 Jianguo	2012 OV_{5}	Jianguo	April 12, 2007	Lulin	LUSS	EUN	1.8 km	MPC · JPL
590667	2012 OS_{6}	—	April 12, 2016	Haleakala	Pan-STARRS 1	·	1.5 km	MPC · JPL
590668	2012 OG_{7}	—	July 18, 2012	Siding Spring	SSS	·	1.2 km	MPC · JPL
590669	2012 OQ_{7}	—	July 21, 2012	Siding Spring	SSS	EUN	990 m	MPC · JPL
590670	2012 PJ_{1}	—	September 23, 2008	Mount Lemmon	Mount Lemmon Survey	·	1.4 km	MPC · JPL
590671	2012 PH_{2}	—	October 22, 2008	Kitt Peak	Spacewatch	·	1.5 km	MPC · JPL
590672	2012 PF_{4}	—	December 31, 2008	Kitt Peak	Spacewatch	·	1.7 km	MPC · JPL
590673	2012 PD_{7}	—	May 23, 2012	Mount Lemmon	Mount Lemmon Survey	·	2.0 km	MPC · JPL
590674	2012 PD_{11}	—	October 31, 2008	Mount Lemmon	Mount Lemmon Survey	·	1.4 km	MPC · JPL
590675	2012 PT_{19}	—	May 21, 2003	Haleakala	NEAT	·	1.8 km	MPC · JPL
590676	2012 PB_{23}	—	February 21, 2002	Kitt Peak	Spacewatch	(5)	1.5 km	MPC · JPL
590677	2012 PP_{29}	—	September 5, 2008	Kitt Peak	Spacewatch	·	1.7 km	MPC · JPL
590678	2012 PU_{35}	—	May 29, 2012	Mount Lemmon	Mount Lemmon Survey	·	1.3 km	MPC · JPL
590679	2012 PF_{47}	—	August 14, 2012	Kitt Peak	Spacewatch	·	1.3 km	MPC · JPL
590680	2012 PE_{54}	—	August 13, 2012	Kitt Peak	Spacewatch	·	1.5 km	MPC · JPL
590681	2012 QA	—	October 15, 1999	Kitt Peak	Spacewatch	·	1.3 km	MPC · JPL
590682	2012 QL_{3}	—	August 6, 2012	Haleakala	Pan-STARRS 1	·	2.6 km	MPC · JPL
590683	2012 QP_{3}	—	February 16, 2007	Bergisch Gladbach	W. Bickel	·	2.0 km	MPC · JPL
590684	2012 QX_{7}	—	August 12, 2012	Catalina	CSS	BAR	1.6 km	MPC · JPL
590685	2012 QZ_{23}	—	January 15, 2005	Kitt Peak	Spacewatch	·	1.8 km	MPC · JPL
590686	2012 QL_{25}	—	August 24, 2012	Kitt Peak	Spacewatch	·	1.3 km	MPC · JPL
590687	2012 QH_{31}	—	October 15, 1999	Kitt Peak	Spacewatch	·	1.5 km	MPC · JPL
590688	2012 QH_{36}	—	January 13, 2005	Kitt Peak	Spacewatch	·	1.5 km	MPC · JPL
590689	2012 QS_{40}	—	November 18, 2008	Catalina	CSS	·	1.8 km	MPC · JPL
590690	2012 QV_{40}	—	August 19, 2012	Siding Spring	SSS	·	2.1 km	MPC · JPL
590691	2012 QU_{43}	—	August 17, 2012	Haleakala	Pan-STARRS 1	·	1.4 km	MPC · JPL
590692	2012 QN_{51}	—	April 5, 2011	Catalina	CSS	ADE	2.6 km	MPC · JPL
590693	2012 QS_{52}	—	January 27, 2004	Anderson Mesa	LONEOS	BRA	2.0 km	MPC · JPL
590694	2012 QT_{54}	—	August 25, 2012	Kitt Peak	Spacewatch	HNS	810 m	MPC · JPL
590695	2012 QU_{55}	—	February 27, 2015	Haleakala	Pan-STARRS 1	·	1.2 km	MPC · JPL
590696	2012 QP_{56}	—	December 27, 2013	Mount Lemmon	Mount Lemmon Survey	·	1.6 km	MPC · JPL
590697	2012 QZ_{56}	—	August 26, 2012	Haleakala	Pan-STARRS 1	·	1.4 km	MPC · JPL
590698	2012 QV_{59}	—	March 22, 2015	Haleakala	Pan-STARRS 1	·	980 m	MPC · JPL
590699	2012 QK_{64}	—	August 17, 2012	Haleakala	Pan-STARRS 1	·	1.4 km	MPC · JPL
590700	2012 QA_{67}	—	August 16, 2012	Alder Springs	Levin, K.	526	1.8 km	MPC · JPL

== 590701–590800 ==
back to top

Designation			Discovery			Properties		Ref
Permanent	Provisional	Named after	Date	Site	Discoverer(s)	Category	Diam.	Ref
590701	2012 QT_{67}	—	August 26, 2012	Kitt Peak	Spacewatch	·	890 m	MPC · JPL
590702	2012 RN_{3}	—	September 8, 2012	Bergisch Gladbach	W. Bickel	·	1.8 km	MPC · JPL
590703	2012 RH_{7}	—	August 23, 2012	Črni Vrh	Skvarč, J.	·	1.8 km	MPC · JPL
590704	2012 RK_{9}	—	September 11, 2012	Alder Springs	Levin, K.	·	1.6 km	MPC · JPL
590705	2012 RM_{16}	—	September 14, 2012	Catalina	CSS	·	1.4 km	MPC · JPL
590706	2012 RD_{17}	—	September 14, 2003	Palomar	NEAT	·	2.2 km	MPC · JPL
590707	2012 RG_{17}	—	September 11, 2012	Kislovodsk	Nevski, V.	·	2.4 km	MPC · JPL
590708	2012 RZ_{20}	—	August 22, 2003	Palomar	NEAT	·	2.3 km	MPC · JPL
590709	2012 RF_{26}	—	December 2, 2005	Mauna Kea	A. Boattini	·	2.7 km	MPC · JPL
590710	2012 RE_{32}	—	August 28, 2003	Haleakala	NEAT	·	2.1 km	MPC · JPL
590711	2012 RR_{32}	—	August 25, 2012	Haleakala	Pan-STARRS 1	EUN	1.0 km	MPC · JPL
590712	2012 RP_{36}	—	October 30, 2008	Kitt Peak	Spacewatch	·	1.4 km	MPC · JPL
590713	2012 RT_{36}	—	November 19, 2008	Mount Lemmon	Mount Lemmon Survey	·	1.1 km	MPC · JPL
590714	2012 RA_{40}	—	August 18, 2012	Črni Vrh	Skvarč, J.	JUN	920 m	MPC · JPL
590715	2012 RK_{42}	—	September 11, 2012	Črni Vrh	Matičič, S.	EUN	1.5 km	MPC · JPL
590716	2012 RA_{43}	—	April 22, 2007	Kitt Peak	Spacewatch	·	1.4 km	MPC · JPL
590717	2012 RR_{43}	—	July 24, 2003	Palomar	NEAT	ADE	2.0 km	MPC · JPL
590718	2012 RS_{48}	—	September 6, 2012	Haleakala	Pan-STARRS 1	·	1.7 km	MPC · JPL
590719	2012 SA_{5}	—	September 23, 2003	Palomar	NEAT	GAL	1.4 km	MPC · JPL
590720	2012 SE_{9}	—	September 17, 2012	Mount Lemmon	Mount Lemmon Survey	·	2.0 km	MPC · JPL
590721	2012 ST_{22}	—	September 22, 2003	Palomar	NEAT	·	3.0 km	MPC · JPL
590722	2012 SR_{23}	—	September 22, 2008	Mount Lemmon	Mount Lemmon Survey	·	870 m	MPC · JPL
590723	2012 SB_{27}	—	September 21, 2003	Palomar	NEAT	NEM	2.6 km	MPC · JPL
590724	2012 SR_{33}	—	August 10, 2012	Kitt Peak	Spacewatch	·	1.6 km	MPC · JPL
590725	2012 SW_{36}	—	September 16, 2003	Kitt Peak	Spacewatch	·	1.5 km	MPC · JPL
590726	2012 SY_{36}	—	September 18, 2012	Mount Lemmon	Mount Lemmon Survey	·	1.4 km	MPC · JPL
590727	2012 SQ_{47}	—	October 25, 2005	Mount Lemmon	Mount Lemmon Survey	·	680 m	MPC · JPL
590728	2012 SV_{47}	—	February 18, 2010	Mount Lemmon	Mount Lemmon Survey	·	1.6 km	MPC · JPL
590729	2012 ST_{48}	—	November 1, 2008	Mount Lemmon	Mount Lemmon Survey	·	1.5 km	MPC · JPL
590730	2012 SO_{52}	—	October 29, 2008	Kitt Peak	Spacewatch	·	1.6 km	MPC · JPL
590731	2012 SJ_{73}	—	September 25, 2012	Mount Lemmon	Mount Lemmon Survey	·	1.5 km	MPC · JPL
590732	2012 SP_{83}	—	September 21, 2012	Mount Lemmon	Mount Lemmon Survey	·	1.6 km	MPC · JPL
590733	2012 SP_{85}	—	September 16, 2012	Kitt Peak	Spacewatch	·	1.5 km	MPC · JPL
590734	2012 SB_{86}	—	September 23, 2012	Mount Lemmon	Mount Lemmon Survey	·	1.4 km	MPC · JPL
590735	2012 SD_{88}	—	September 25, 2012	Mount Lemmon	Mount Lemmon Survey	GEF	940 m	MPC · JPL
590736	2012 TN_{4}	—	November 24, 2003	Palomar	NEAT	·	610 m	MPC · JPL
590737	2012 TV_{20}	—	March 23, 2001	Cima Ekar	ADAS	·	2.6 km	MPC · JPL
590738	2012 TD_{25}	—	September 22, 2012	Kitt Peak	Spacewatch	·	1.1 km	MPC · JPL
590739 Miloslavov	2012 TF_{29}	Miloslavov	September 18, 2012	Mount Lemmon SkyCe	T. Vorobjov, Kostin, A.	·	1.4 km	MPC · JPL
590740	2012 TK_{40}	—	October 8, 2012	Mount Lemmon	Mount Lemmon Survey	·	1.4 km	MPC · JPL
590741	2012 TM_{40}	—	November 19, 2003	Kitt Peak	Spacewatch	·	1.5 km	MPC · JPL
590742	2012 TS_{54}	—	October 27, 2003	Kitt Peak	Spacewatch	·	2.3 km	MPC · JPL
590743	2012 TE_{58}	—	October 20, 2003	Palomar	NEAT	·	1.8 km	MPC · JPL
590744	2012 TR_{58}	—	September 26, 2003	Apache Point	SDSS Collaboration	NEM	2.4 km	MPC · JPL
590745	2012 TR_{60}	—	October 19, 2003	Kitt Peak	Spacewatch	·	1.6 km	MPC · JPL
590746	2012 TA_{63}	—	October 8, 2012	Haleakala	Pan-STARRS 1	·	1.3 km	MPC · JPL
590747	2012 TG_{67}	—	December 1, 2003	Kitt Peak	Spacewatch	·	2.0 km	MPC · JPL
590748	2012 TG_{72}	—	January 15, 2005	Kitt Peak	Spacewatch	·	1.4 km	MPC · JPL
590749	2012 TY_{72}	—	October 9, 2012	Mount Lemmon	Mount Lemmon Survey	·	1.6 km	MPC · JPL
590750	2012 TD_{74}	—	March 19, 2010	Kitt Peak	Spacewatch	·	1.6 km	MPC · JPL
590751	2012 TK_{76}	—	September 25, 2012	Kitt Peak	Spacewatch	·	1.2 km	MPC · JPL
590752	2012 TK_{81}	—	October 5, 2012	Haleakala	Pan-STARRS 1	·	1.6 km	MPC · JPL
590753	2012 TV_{82}	—	October 23, 2009	Mount Lemmon	Mount Lemmon Survey	·	680 m	MPC · JPL
590754	2012 TT_{89}	—	October 7, 2012	Haleakala	Pan-STARRS 1	·	1.4 km	MPC · JPL
590755	2012 TU_{90}	—	October 7, 2012	Haleakala	Pan-STARRS 1	·	1.6 km	MPC · JPL
590756	2012 TG_{91}	—	October 23, 2003	Kitt Peak	Spacewatch	·	2.4 km	MPC · JPL
590757	2012 TQ_{91}	—	September 17, 2012	Kitt Peak	Spacewatch	·	1.6 km	MPC · JPL
590758	2012 TV_{106}	—	October 9, 2012	Haleakala	Pan-STARRS 1	·	1.9 km	MPC · JPL
590759	2012 TO_{107}	—	February 16, 2005	La Silla	A. Boattini	AGN	1.1 km	MPC · JPL
590760	2012 TF_{113}	—	September 16, 2012	Kitt Peak	Spacewatch	MRX	820 m	MPC · JPL
590761 Fixin	2012 TP_{116}	Fixin	February 7, 2005	Vicques	M. Ory	DOR	2.6 km	MPC · JPL
590762	2012 TL_{118}	—	October 10, 2012	Mount Lemmon	Mount Lemmon Survey	·	1.6 km	MPC · JPL
590763	2012 TZ_{119}	—	September 22, 2003	Palomar	NEAT	·	2.2 km	MPC · JPL
590764	2012 TH_{126}	—	October 6, 2012	Catalina	CSS	·	2.1 km	MPC · JPL
590765	2012 TG_{127}	—	September 16, 2003	Kitt Peak	Spacewatch	·	1.6 km	MPC · JPL
590766	2012 TN_{128}	—	September 4, 2003	Črni Vrh	Mikuž, H.	EUN	1.2 km	MPC · JPL
590767	2012 TB_{133}	—	August 24, 2003	Cerro Tololo	Deep Ecliptic Survey	·	2.1 km	MPC · JPL
590768	2012 TK_{133}	—	October 5, 2012	Haleakala	Pan-STARRS 1	HOF	2.4 km	MPC · JPL
590769	2012 TL_{134}	—	October 29, 2008	Kitt Peak	Spacewatch	WIT	1.0 km	MPC · JPL
590770	2012 TL_{138}	—	September 18, 2003	Campo Imperatore	CINEOS	·	1.4 km	MPC · JPL
590771	2012 TX_{138}	—	October 9, 2012	Nogales	M. Schwartz, P. R. Holvorcem	EUN	1.0 km	MPC · JPL
590772	2012 TA_{139}	—	October 1, 2003	Kitt Peak	Spacewatch	·	1.4 km	MPC · JPL
590773	2012 TF_{139}	—	October 3, 2003	Kitt Peak	Spacewatch	NEM	2.1 km	MPC · JPL
590774	2012 TG_{142}	—	October 6, 2012	Haleakala	Pan-STARRS 1	·	1.5 km	MPC · JPL
590775	2012 TT_{154}	—	October 8, 2012	Haleakala	Pan-STARRS 1	·	1.7 km	MPC · JPL
590776	2012 TH_{158}	—	September 13, 2007	Mount Lemmon	Mount Lemmon Survey	AST	1.3 km	MPC · JPL
590777	2012 TP_{158}	—	September 13, 2007	Mount Lemmon	Mount Lemmon Survey	KOR	1.2 km	MPC · JPL
590778	2012 TL_{165}	—	October 20, 2003	Kitt Peak	Spacewatch	NEM	2.2 km	MPC · JPL
590779	2012 TG_{167}	—	October 8, 2012	Haleakala	Pan-STARRS 1	·	1.9 km	MPC · JPL
590780	2012 TO_{178}	—	October 9, 2012	Haleakala	Pan-STARRS 1	·	1.5 km	MPC · JPL
590781	2012 TO_{179}	—	October 9, 2012	Haleakala	Pan-STARRS 1	·	1.4 km	MPC · JPL
590782	2012 TR_{180}	—	October 9, 2012	Haleakala	Pan-STARRS 1	·	1.7 km	MPC · JPL
590783	2012 TV_{182}	—	March 24, 2006	Mount Lemmon	Mount Lemmon Survey	·	1.6 km	MPC · JPL
590784	2012 TB_{188}	—	March 4, 2006	Mount Lemmon	Mount Lemmon Survey	·	980 m	MPC · JPL
590785	2012 TG_{192}	—	October 10, 2012	Mount Lemmon	Mount Lemmon Survey	·	1.9 km	MPC · JPL
590786	2012 TX_{194}	—	August 28, 2012	Mount Lemmon	Mount Lemmon Survey	HOF	2.2 km	MPC · JPL
590787	2012 TB_{196}	—	December 4, 2008	Mount Lemmon	Mount Lemmon Survey	·	2.2 km	MPC · JPL
590788	2012 TA_{201}	—	October 11, 2012	Mount Lemmon	Mount Lemmon Survey	·	1.3 km	MPC · JPL
590789	2012 TJ_{203}	—	October 11, 2012	Mount Lemmon	Mount Lemmon Survey	·	1.2 km	MPC · JPL
590790	2012 TW_{204}	—	October 11, 2012	Mount Lemmon	Mount Lemmon Survey	·	1.5 km	MPC · JPL
590791	2012 TA_{211}	—	October 11, 2012	Haleakala	Pan-STARRS 1	·	1.4 km	MPC · JPL
590792	2012 TL_{214}	—	March 2, 2006	Kitt Peak	Spacewatch	L5	7.4 km	MPC · JPL
590793	2012 TW_{218}	—	October 14, 2012	Mayhill-ISON	L. Elenin	·	2.0 km	MPC · JPL
590794	2012 TC_{223}	—	November 22, 2008	Mount Lemmon	Mount Lemmon Survey	·	1.5 km	MPC · JPL
590795	2012 TJ_{223}	—	October 6, 2012	Haleakala	Pan-STARRS 1	·	2.3 km	MPC · JPL
590796	2012 TR_{237}	—	August 9, 2007	Kitt Peak	Spacewatch	·	1.7 km	MPC · JPL
590797	2012 TT_{239}	—	October 8, 2012	Mount Lemmon	Mount Lemmon Survey	·	1.4 km	MPC · JPL
590798	2012 TS_{243}	—	October 8, 2008	Kitt Peak	Spacewatch	·	820 m	MPC · JPL
590799	2012 TP_{247}	—	October 11, 2012	Kitt Peak	Spacewatch	·	1.9 km	MPC · JPL
590800	2012 TC_{249}	—	October 11, 2012	Haleakala	Pan-STARRS 1	·	1.8 km	MPC · JPL

== 590801–590900 ==
back to top

Designation			Discovery			Properties		Ref
Permanent	Provisional	Named after	Date	Site	Discoverer(s)	Category	Diam.	Ref
590801	2012 TF_{258}	—	September 18, 2012	Mount Lemmon	Mount Lemmon Survey	·	1.6 km	MPC · JPL
590802	2012 TO_{259}	—	September 20, 2003	Kitt Peak	Spacewatch	·	1.6 km	MPC · JPL
590803	2012 TH_{260}	—	October 7, 2012	Haleakala	Pan-STARRS 1	·	1.6 km	MPC · JPL
590804	2012 TK_{260}	—	September 25, 2008	Kitt Peak	Spacewatch	·	1.8 km	MPC · JPL
590805	2012 TB_{270}	—	October 11, 2012	Mount Lemmon	Mount Lemmon Survey	NEM	2.3 km	MPC · JPL
590806	2012 TE_{271}	—	October 11, 2012	Mount Lemmon	Mount Lemmon Survey	·	1.4 km	MPC · JPL
590807	2012 TR_{275}	—	June 6, 2011	Haleakala	Pan-STARRS 1	·	1.8 km	MPC · JPL
590808	2012 TX_{278}	—	September 18, 2003	Kitt Peak	Spacewatch	·	1.3 km	MPC · JPL
590809	2012 TL_{282}	—	August 23, 2003	Palomar	NEAT	·	1.8 km	MPC · JPL
590810	2012 TF_{297}	—	September 19, 1998	Apache Point	SDSS	·	1.7 km	MPC · JPL
590811	2012 TN_{297}	—	October 15, 2012	Kitt Peak	Spacewatch	L4	10 km	MPC · JPL
590812	2012 TS_{304}	—	December 3, 2008	Mount Lemmon	Mount Lemmon Survey	·	1.5 km	MPC · JPL
590813	2012 TY_{306}	—	October 10, 2012	Nogales	M. Schwartz, P. R. Holvorcem	·	1.4 km	MPC · JPL
590814	2012 TH_{308}	—	October 3, 2003	Kitt Peak	Spacewatch	·	2.9 km	MPC · JPL
590815	2012 TU_{311}	—	October 14, 2012	Nogales	M. Schwartz, P. R. Holvorcem	·	1.7 km	MPC · JPL
590816	2012 TJ_{314}	—	September 20, 2012	Mayhill-ISON	L. Elenin	·	1.8 km	MPC · JPL
590817	2012 TU_{318}	—	September 18, 2003	Haleakala	NEAT	·	2.4 km	MPC · JPL
590818	2012 TC_{329}	—	October 8, 2012	Haleakala	Pan-STARRS 1	·	1.7 km	MPC · JPL
590819	2012 TY_{330}	—	October 11, 2012	Haleakala	Pan-STARRS 1	·	1.6 km	MPC · JPL
590820	2012 TZ_{330}	—	October 6, 2012	Catalina	CSS	·	1.4 km	MPC · JPL
590821	2012 TJ_{332}	—	April 16, 2015	Haleakala	Pan-STARRS 1	·	2.1 km	MPC · JPL
590822	2012 TA_{333}	—	February 20, 2014	Mount Lemmon	Mount Lemmon Survey	DOR	1.6 km	MPC · JPL
590823	2012 TN_{333}	—	March 21, 2015	Haleakala	Pan-STARRS 1	·	1.4 km	MPC · JPL
590824	2012 TD_{336}	—	September 17, 2003	Kitt Peak	Spacewatch	·	1.1 km	MPC · JPL
590825	2012 TA_{337}	—	October 6, 2012	Haleakala	Pan-STARRS 1	·	1.5 km	MPC · JPL
590826	2012 TB_{357}	—	October 9, 2012	Haleakala	Pan-STARRS 1	·	1.5 km	MPC · JPL
590827	2012 TE_{358}	—	October 11, 2012	Haleakala	Pan-STARRS 1	KOR	960 m	MPC · JPL
590828	2012 TK_{359}	—	October 9, 2012	Mount Lemmon	Mount Lemmon Survey	·	1.2 km	MPC · JPL
590829	2012 TN_{360}	—	October 14, 2012	Mount Lemmon	Mount Lemmon Survey	HOF	2.0 km	MPC · JPL
590830	2012 TO_{375}	—	October 8, 2012	Haleakala	Pan-STARRS 1	·	1.4 km	MPC · JPL
590831	2012 UN_{2}	—	February 20, 2001	Kitt Peak	Spacewatch	·	1.4 km	MPC · JPL
590832	2012 UR_{4}	—	October 7, 2008	Mount Lemmon	Mount Lemmon Survey	(5)	1 km	MPC · JPL
590833	2012 US_{14}	—	October 16, 2012	Mount Lemmon	Mount Lemmon Survey	·	1.4 km	MPC · JPL
590834	2012 UV_{17}	—	March 18, 2010	Kitt Peak	Spacewatch	·	1.6 km	MPC · JPL
590835	2012 UP_{20}	—	September 16, 2003	Kitt Peak	Spacewatch	·	1.9 km	MPC · JPL
590836	2012 UD_{22}	—	October 16, 2012	Mount Lemmon	Mount Lemmon Survey	·	1.5 km	MPC · JPL
590837	2012 US_{22}	—	October 17, 2012	Mount Lemmon	Mount Lemmon Survey	·	1.7 km	MPC · JPL
590838	2012 UM_{26}	—	October 17, 2012	Mount Lemmon	Mount Lemmon Survey	·	1.9 km	MPC · JPL
590839	2012 UX_{35}	—	August 19, 2002	Palomar	NEAT	HOF	2.7 km	MPC · JPL
590840	2012 UN_{37}	—	January 7, 2000	Kitt Peak	Spacewatch	·	1.9 km	MPC · JPL
590841	2012 UF_{39}	—	September 25, 2003	Palomar	NEAT	·	2.1 km	MPC · JPL
590842	2012 UQ_{44}	—	October 6, 2012	Kitt Peak	Spacewatch	EOS	1.7 km	MPC · JPL
590843	2012 UR_{52}	—	September 13, 2007	Mount Lemmon	Mount Lemmon Survey	AGN	970 m	MPC · JPL
590844	2012 UG_{53}	—	October 5, 2012	Piszkés-tető	K. Sárneczky, G. Dálya	·	2.3 km	MPC · JPL
590845	2012 UO_{55}	—	March 10, 2005	Mount Lemmon	Mount Lemmon Survey	·	1.6 km	MPC · JPL
590846	2012 UM_{57}	—	October 18, 2003	Saint-Sulpice	B. Christophe	·	1.6 km	MPC · JPL
590847	2012 UX_{66}	—	October 20, 2012	Kitt Peak	Spacewatch	·	1.1 km	MPC · JPL
590848	2012 UT_{82}	—	August 2, 2011	Haleakala	Pan-STARRS 1	·	1.6 km	MPC · JPL
590849	2012 UN_{83}	—	November 5, 2007	Kitt Peak	Spacewatch	·	1.7 km	MPC · JPL
590850	2012 UH_{86}	—	January 3, 2009	Kitt Peak	Spacewatch	AGN	1 km	MPC · JPL
590851	2012 UK_{97}	—	November 22, 2003	Kitt Peak	Deep Ecliptic Survey	·	2.0 km	MPC · JPL
590852	2012 UD_{100}	—	October 18, 2012	Haleakala	Pan-STARRS 1	KOR	980 m	MPC · JPL
590853	2012 UF_{106}	—	August 21, 2008	Kitt Peak	Spacewatch	MAS	650 m	MPC · JPL
590854	2012 UG_{106}	—	November 18, 2006	Kitt Peak	Spacewatch	·	990 m	MPC · JPL
590855	2012 UY_{106}	—	May 11, 2010	Mount Lemmon	Mount Lemmon Survey	·	2.2 km	MPC · JPL
590856	2012 UU_{109}	—	September 19, 2012	Mount Lemmon	Mount Lemmon Survey	·	1.3 km	MPC · JPL
590857	2012 UV_{111}	—	October 21, 2012	Haleakala	Pan-STARRS 1	·	1.6 km	MPC · JPL
590858	2012 UB_{120}	—	October 15, 2012	Kitt Peak	Spacewatch	·	1.9 km	MPC · JPL
590859	2012 UA_{123}	—	October 21, 2007	Mount Lemmon	Mount Lemmon Survey	·	1.6 km	MPC · JPL
590860	2012 UU_{133}	—	September 26, 2012	Nogales	M. Schwartz, P. R. Holvorcem	·	2.0 km	MPC · JPL
590861	2012 UM_{135}	—	October 9, 2012	Catalina	CSS	·	2.0 km	MPC · JPL
590862	2012 UY_{135}	—	May 7, 2011	Mount Lemmon	Mount Lemmon Survey	·	1.9 km	MPC · JPL
590863	2012 UH_{143}	—	October 18, 2012	Haleakala	Pan-STARRS 1	·	1.9 km	MPC · JPL
590864	2012 UX_{146}	—	October 9, 2012	Kitt Peak	Spacewatch	·	2.1 km	MPC · JPL
590865	2012 UZ_{159}	—	August 20, 2003	Haleakala	NEAT	·	2.4 km	MPC · JPL
590866	2012 UA_{161}	—	October 19, 2003	Kitt Peak	Spacewatch	·	1.8 km	MPC · JPL
590867	2012 UP_{161}	—	January 19, 2005	Kitt Peak	Spacewatch	PAD	2.0 km	MPC · JPL
590868	2012 UQ_{162}	—	October 22, 2012	Kitt Peak	Spacewatch	·	730 m	MPC · JPL
590869	2012 UX_{172}	—	February 18, 2010	Mount Lemmon	Mount Lemmon Survey	·	1.3 km	MPC · JPL
590870	2012 UK_{185}	—	August 1, 2016	Haleakala	Pan-STARRS 1	·	1.8 km	MPC · JPL
590871	2012 UJ_{186}	—	October 17, 2012	Mount Lemmon	Mount Lemmon Survey	·	1.8 km	MPC · JPL
590872	2012 UQ_{191}	—	November 23, 1995	Kitt Peak	Spacewatch	PHO	750 m	MPC · JPL
590873	2012 UX_{191}	—	October 20, 2012	Haleakala	Pan-STARRS 1	·	1.4 km	MPC · JPL
590874	2012 UG_{216}	—	September 10, 2007	Mount Lemmon	Mount Lemmon Survey	·	1.7 km	MPC · JPL
590875	2012 UO_{217}	—	October 21, 2012	Haleakala	Pan-STARRS 1	·	1.7 km	MPC · JPL
590876	2012 UC_{220}	—	October 25, 2012	Kitt Peak	Spacewatch	·	1.6 km	MPC · JPL
590877	2012 UY_{220}	—	October 9, 2012	Mount Lemmon	Mount Lemmon Survey	·	1.8 km	MPC · JPL
590878	2012 VX_{9}	—	November 19, 2003	Kitt Peak	Spacewatch	·	2.1 km	MPC · JPL
590879	2012 VK_{14}	—	November 4, 2012	Mount Lemmon	Mount Lemmon Survey	·	1.5 km	MPC · JPL
590880	2012 VM_{16}	—	November 19, 2007	Kitt Peak	Spacewatch	·	1.9 km	MPC · JPL
590881	2012 VD_{28}	—	September 17, 2003	Kitt Peak	Spacewatch	·	1.2 km	MPC · JPL
590882	2012 VK_{36}	—	November 6, 2008	Mount Lemmon	Mount Lemmon Survey	·	2.2 km	MPC · JPL
590883	2012 VB_{41}	—	November 6, 2012	Haleakala	Pan-STARRS 1	·	580 m	MPC · JPL
590884	2012 VT_{45}	—	February 4, 2005	Kitt Peak	Spacewatch	·	2.1 km	MPC · JPL
590885	2012 VE_{50}	—	October 23, 2003	Kitt Peak	Deep Ecliptic Survey	·	1.7 km	MPC · JPL
590886	2012 VV_{50}	—	October 15, 1999	Kitt Peak	Spacewatch	·	1.3 km	MPC · JPL
590887	2012 VJ_{52}	—	July 8, 2003	Palomar	NEAT	BRG	2.1 km	MPC · JPL
590888 Chengda	2012 VB_{53}	Chengda	July 22, 2007	Lulin	LUSS	MRX	1.3 km	MPC · JPL
590889	2012 VE_{58}	—	November 7, 2012	Haleakala	Pan-STARRS 1	KOR	1.1 km	MPC · JPL
590890	2012 VO_{60}	—	November 7, 2012	Haleakala	Pan-STARRS 1	HOF	2.3 km	MPC · JPL
590891	2012 VZ_{65}	—	September 10, 2007	Kitt Peak	Spacewatch	·	1.3 km	MPC · JPL
590892	2012 VP_{66}	—	September 14, 2007	Kitt Peak	Spacewatch	AGN	980 m	MPC · JPL
590893	2012 VO_{70}	—	November 7, 2012	Haleakala	Pan-STARRS 1	MRX	1.1 km	MPC · JPL
590894	2012 VK_{74}	—	August 14, 2002	Palomar	NEAT	·	2.3 km	MPC · JPL
590895	2012 VY_{74}	—	November 12, 2012	Bergisch Gladbach	W. Bickel	AGN	1.3 km	MPC · JPL
590896	2012 VJ_{75}	—	October 21, 2012	Haleakala	Pan-STARRS 1	·	660 m	MPC · JPL
590897	2012 VQ_{78}	—	September 10, 2007	Kitt Peak	Spacewatch	AGN	1.1 km	MPC · JPL
590898	2012 VT_{98}	—	December 3, 2008	Mount Lemmon	Mount Lemmon Survey	·	2.2 km	MPC · JPL
590899	2012 VZ_{102}	—	April 7, 2002	Cerro Tololo	Deep Ecliptic Survey	·	1.8 km	MPC · JPL
590900	2012 VO_{110}	—	October 17, 2007	Mount Lemmon	Mount Lemmon Survey	·	1.7 km	MPC · JPL

== 590901–591000 ==
back to top

Designation			Discovery			Properties		Ref
Permanent	Provisional	Named after	Date	Site	Discoverer(s)	Category	Diam.	Ref
590901	2012 VB_{115}	—	November 18, 2008	Kitt Peak	Spacewatch	·	700 m	MPC · JPL
590902	2012 VF_{115}	—	May 7, 2006	Mount Lemmon	Mount Lemmon Survey	·	1.7 km	MPC · JPL
590903	2012 VZ_{117}	—	August 9, 2016	Haleakala	Pan-STARRS 1	·	1.6 km	MPC · JPL
590904	2012 VD_{127}	—	November 12, 2012	Mount Lemmon	Mount Lemmon Survey	·	1.6 km	MPC · JPL
590905	2012 VY_{128}	—	February 4, 2009	Mount Lemmon	Mount Lemmon Survey	HOF	2.2 km	MPC · JPL
590906	2012 WJ_{10}	—	April 11, 2010	Mount Lemmon	Mount Lemmon Survey	ADE	1.5 km	MPC · JPL
590907	2012 WR_{12}	—	November 19, 2012	Kitt Peak	Spacewatch	AEO	1.0 km	MPC · JPL
590908	2012 WH_{37}	—	November 26, 2012	Mount Lemmon	Mount Lemmon Survey	·	2.0 km	MPC · JPL
590909	2012 XT_{5}	—	December 4, 2012	Mount Lemmon	Mount Lemmon Survey	·	1.4 km	MPC · JPL
590910	2012 XE_{7}	—	October 25, 2012	Kitt Peak	Spacewatch	·	1.9 km	MPC · JPL
590911	2012 XQ_{9}	—	October 15, 2012	Kitt Peak	Spacewatch	GAL	1.3 km	MPC · JPL
590912	2012 XL_{20}	—	October 25, 2001	Apache Point	SDSS Collaboration	EOS	1.7 km	MPC · JPL
590913	2012 XS_{22}	—	November 4, 2007	Mount Lemmon	Mount Lemmon Survey	KOR	1.3 km	MPC · JPL
590914	2012 XF_{25}	—	October 22, 2012	Haleakala	Pan-STARRS 1	·	1.7 km	MPC · JPL
590915	2012 XG_{30}	—	January 6, 2010	Kitt Peak	Spacewatch	·	580 m	MPC · JPL
590916	2012 XK_{34}	—	December 3, 2012	Mount Lemmon	Mount Lemmon Survey	HOF	2.6 km	MPC · JPL
590917	2012 XX_{34}	—	November 12, 2012	Mount Lemmon	Mount Lemmon Survey	·	1.8 km	MPC · JPL
590918	2012 XA_{36}	—	December 3, 2012	Mount Lemmon	Mount Lemmon Survey	·	560 m	MPC · JPL
590919	2012 XY_{42}	—	December 3, 2012	Mount Lemmon	Mount Lemmon Survey	·	570 m	MPC · JPL
590920	2012 XH_{51}	—	October 8, 2012	Mount Lemmon	Mount Lemmon Survey	·	1.4 km	MPC · JPL
590921	2012 XD_{61}	—	November 12, 2012	Mount Lemmon	Mount Lemmon Survey	·	1.5 km	MPC · JPL
590922	2012 XR_{72}	—	December 6, 2012	Mount Lemmon	Mount Lemmon Survey	·	1.6 km	MPC · JPL
590923	2012 XE_{78}	—	June 6, 2003	Kitt Peak	Spacewatch	RAF	700 m	MPC · JPL
590924	2012 XU_{78}	—	October 1, 2008	Kitt Peak	Spacewatch	·	1.1 km	MPC · JPL
590925	2012 XG_{96}	—	December 4, 2012	Kitt Peak	Spacewatch	·	2.0 km	MPC · JPL
590926	2012 XZ_{99}	—	November 13, 2012	Kitt Peak	Spacewatch	GEF	990 m	MPC · JPL
590927	2012 XM_{113}	—	October 5, 2012	Kitt Peak	Spacewatch	·	2.2 km	MPC · JPL
590928	2012 XN_{124}	—	December 9, 2012	Haleakala	Pan-STARRS 1	TRE	2.7 km	MPC · JPL
590929	2012 XO_{128}	—	September 10, 2007	Kitt Peak	Spacewatch	·	2.2 km	MPC · JPL
590930	2012 XP_{141}	—	September 14, 2007	Mount Lemmon	Mount Lemmon Survey	KOR	1.3 km	MPC · JPL
590931	2012 XX_{144}	—	December 8, 2012	Mount Lemmon	Mount Lemmon Survey	·	1.8 km	MPC · JPL
590932	2012 XP_{146}	—	November 6, 2012	Kitt Peak	Spacewatch	·	1.5 km	MPC · JPL
590933	2012 XM_{147}	—	September 21, 2011	Mount Lemmon	Mount Lemmon Survey	KOR	1.3 km	MPC · JPL
590934	2012 XM_{149}	—	September 13, 2007	Catalina	CSS	·	1.7 km	MPC · JPL
590935	2012 XZ_{149}	—	February 11, 2004	Kitt Peak	Spacewatch	BRA	1.9 km	MPC · JPL
590936	2012 XC_{160}	—	December 12, 2012	Mount Lemmon	Mount Lemmon Survey	·	1.9 km	MPC · JPL
590937	2012 XH_{167}	—	December 8, 2012	Mount Lemmon	Mount Lemmon Survey	·	1.9 km	MPC · JPL
590938	2012 XH_{169}	—	December 12, 2012	Mount Lemmon	Mount Lemmon Survey	·	2.2 km	MPC · JPL
590939	2012 XQ_{170}	—	December 9, 2012	Mount Lemmon	Mount Lemmon Survey	·	2.6 km	MPC · JPL
590940	2012 XN_{171}	—	December 8, 2012	Kitt Peak	Spacewatch	·	500 m	MPC · JPL
590941	2012 XR_{175}	—	December 11, 2012	Mount Lemmon	Mount Lemmon Survey	·	2.3 km	MPC · JPL
590942	2012 YE_{1}	—	November 25, 2011	Haleakala	Pan-STARRS 1	L4	8.9 km	MPC · JPL
590943	2012 YR_{2}	—	November 19, 2003	Palomar	NEAT	·	1.7 km	MPC · JPL
590944	2012 YT_{9}	—	February 13, 2002	Apache Point	SDSS	L4	7.7 km	MPC · JPL
590945	2012 YJ_{12}	—	December 23, 2012	Haleakala	Pan-STARRS 1	·	2.5 km	MPC · JPL
590946	2012 YK_{17}	—	December 23, 2012	Haleakala	Pan-STARRS 1	·	1.4 km	MPC · JPL
590947	2012 YO_{22}	—	December 22, 2012	Haleakala	Pan-STARRS 1	EOS	1.7 km	MPC · JPL
590948	2013 AU_{20}	—	January 3, 2013	Catalina	CSS	·	1.8 km	MPC · JPL
590949	2013 AC_{24}	—	January 6, 2013	Mount Lemmon	Mount Lemmon Survey	EOS	1.6 km	MPC · JPL
590950	2013 AF_{30}	—	September 27, 2011	Mount Lemmon	Mount Lemmon Survey	·	2.3 km	MPC · JPL
590951	2013 AA_{35}	—	December 4, 2007	Mount Lemmon	Mount Lemmon Survey	·	2.0 km	MPC · JPL
590952	2013 AU_{35}	—	November 25, 2011	Haleakala	Pan-STARRS 1	L4	8.6 km	MPC · JPL
590953	2013 AY_{48}	—	January 7, 2013	Haleakala	Pan-STARRS 1	·	2.6 km	MPC · JPL
590954	2013 AH_{58}	—	January 6, 2013	Kitt Peak	Spacewatch	·	2.6 km	MPC · JPL
590955	2013 AH_{69}	—	February 14, 2002	Kitt Peak	Spacewatch	·	2.5 km	MPC · JPL
590956	2013 AY_{77}	—	January 10, 2013	Kitt Peak	Spacewatch	EOS	1.5 km	MPC · JPL
590957	2013 AY_{82}	—	December 11, 2012	Kitt Peak	Spacewatch	·	590 m	MPC · JPL
590958	2013 AU_{88}	—	January 14, 2013	ESA OGS	ESA OGS	L4	10 km	MPC · JPL
590959	2013 AD_{90}	—	December 13, 2010	Mount Lemmon	Mount Lemmon Survey	L4	7.1 km	MPC · JPL
590960	2013 AN_{90}	—	January 15, 2013	Charleston	R. Holmes	·	1.5 km	MPC · JPL
590961	2013 AS_{91}	—	July 6, 2005	Kitt Peak	Spacewatch	EOS	2.1 km	MPC · JPL
590962	2013 AB_{93}	—	February 11, 2004	Kitt Peak	Spacewatch	·	1.9 km	MPC · JPL
590963	2013 AH_{94}	—	August 2, 1995	Kitt Peak	Spacewatch	L4 · 006	10 km	MPC · JPL
590964	2013 AM_{95}	—	December 15, 2003	Needville	Observatory, George	EUN	1.1 km	MPC · JPL
590965	2013 AW_{97}	—	January 5, 2013	Mount Lemmon	Mount Lemmon Survey	·	1.7 km	MPC · JPL
590966	2013 AM_{98}	—	January 6, 2013	Mount Lemmon	Mount Lemmon Survey	·	2.8 km	MPC · JPL
590967	2013 AT_{101}	—	January 4, 2013	Kitt Peak	Spacewatch	·	3.2 km	MPC · JPL
590968	2013 AV_{101}	—	August 29, 2006	Lulin	LUSS	·	2.4 km	MPC · JPL
590969	2013 AQ_{103}	—	January 5, 2013	Mount Lemmon	Mount Lemmon Survey	L4	10 km	MPC · JPL
590970	2013 AO_{106}	—	January 10, 2013	Haleakala	Pan-STARRS 1	L4	8.1 km	MPC · JPL
590971	2013 AE_{109}	—	May 10, 2005	Cerro Tololo	Deep Ecliptic Survey	L4	7.1 km	MPC · JPL
590972	2013 AC_{112}	—	January 5, 2013	Kitt Peak	Spacewatch	L4	10 km	MPC · JPL
590973	2013 AN_{112}	—	December 18, 2003	Kitt Peak	Spacewatch	·	1.5 km	MPC · JPL
590974	2013 AG_{117}	—	March 12, 2003	Palomar	NEAT	EOS	2.8 km	MPC · JPL
590975	2013 AK_{122}	—	April 2, 2002	Palomar	NEAT	L4	8.0 km	MPC · JPL
590976	2013 AE_{124}	—	January 4, 2013	Kitt Peak	Spacewatch	PHO	750 m	MPC · JPL
590977	2013 AN_{129}	—	July 30, 2008	Mount Lemmon	Mount Lemmon Survey	L4 · ERY	8.7 km	MPC · JPL
590978	2013 AW_{129}	—	October 20, 2012	Mount Lemmon	Mount Lemmon Survey	L4	8.7 km	MPC · JPL
590979	2013 AS_{132}	—	August 3, 2008	Siding Spring	SSS	L4	10 km	MPC · JPL
590980	2013 AT_{132}	—	January 4, 2013	Mount Lemmon	Mount Lemmon Survey	L4	9.0 km	MPC · JPL
590981	2013 AC_{133}	—	October 29, 2010	Mount Lemmon	Mount Lemmon Survey	L4	6.9 km	MPC · JPL
590982	2013 AP_{133}	—	November 12, 2010	Mount Lemmon	Mount Lemmon Survey	L4	8.5 km	MPC · JPL
590983	2013 AN_{134}	—	September 16, 2009	Kitt Peak	Spacewatch	L4	6.8 km	MPC · JPL
590984	2013 AR_{134}	—	September 1, 2005	Kitt Peak	Spacewatch	·	390 m	MPC · JPL
590985	2013 AZ_{136}	—	January 9, 2013	Kitt Peak	Spacewatch	L4	7.0 km	MPC · JPL
590986	2013 AB_{141}	—	March 27, 2003	Palomar	NEAT	·	2.9 km	MPC · JPL
590987	2013 AO_{142}	—	January 4, 2013	Cerro Tololo-DECam	DECam	L4	8.1 km	MPC · JPL
590988	2013 AE_{146}	—	January 4, 2013	Cerro Tololo-DECam	DECam	·	1.4 km	MPC · JPL
590989	2013 AN_{148}	—	November 23, 2006	Kitt Peak	Spacewatch	·	2.6 km	MPC · JPL
590990	2013 AF_{161}	—	January 20, 2013	Mount Lemmon	Mount Lemmon Survey	·	2.1 km	MPC · JPL
590991	2013 AQ_{161}	—	January 20, 2013	Mount Lemmon	Mount Lemmon Survey	L4	9.6 km	MPC · JPL
590992	2013 AU_{163}	—	October 21, 2006	Kitt Peak	Spacewatch	NAE	1.7 km	MPC · JPL
590993	2013 AF_{164}	—	January 4, 2013	Cerro Tololo-DECam	DECam	·	2.1 km	MPC · JPL
590994	2013 AU_{165}	—	September 30, 2005	Mount Lemmon	Mount Lemmon Survey	·	2.1 km	MPC · JPL
590995	2013 AP_{168}	—	January 4, 2013	Cerro Tololo-DECam	DECam	TEL	1.3 km	MPC · JPL
590996	2013 AD_{171}	—	January 18, 2013	Haleakala	Pan-STARRS 1	·	2.3 km	MPC · JPL
590997	2013 AF_{176}	—	August 16, 2009	Kitt Peak	Spacewatch	L4	6.2 km	MPC · JPL
590998	2013 AU_{185}	—	February 4, 2009	Mount Lemmon	Mount Lemmon Survey	(5)	1.0 km	MPC · JPL
590999	2013 AO_{188}	—	January 14, 2013	Haleakala	Pan-STARRS 1	·	2.8 km	MPC · JPL
591000 Galaverni	2013 AB_{189}	Galaverni	December 8, 2012	Mount Graham	K. Černis, R. P. Boyle	·	1.6 km	MPC · JPL

back to top

== Meaning of names ==
As minor planet discoveries are confirmed, they are given a permanent number by the IAU's Minor Planet Center (MPC), and the discoverers can then submit names for them, following the IAU's naming conventions. The list below concerns those minor planets in the specified number-range that have received names, and explains the meanings of those names.

Official naming citations of newly named small Solar System bodies are approved and published in a bulletin by IAU's Working Group for Small Bodies Nomenclature (WGSBN). Before May 2021, citations were published in MPC's Minor Planet Circulars for many decades. Recent citations can also be found on the JPL Small-Body Database (SBDB). Until his death in 2016, German astronomer Lutz D. Schmadel compiled these citations into the Dictionary of Minor Planet Names (DMP) and regularly updated the collection.

Based on Paul Herget's The Names of the Minor Planets, Schmadel also researched the unclear origin of numerous asteroids, most of which had been named prior to World War II. This article incorporates text from this source, which is in the public domain: SBDB New namings may only be added to this list below after official publication as the preannouncement of names is condemned. The WGSBN publishes a comprehensive guideline for the naming rules of non-cometary small Solar System bodies.

Named minor planet	Provisional	This minor planet was named for...	Ref · Catalog
590269 Steinberger	2011 UF_{336}	Sarolta Steinberger (1875–1966), Hungarian obstetrician-gynecologist, and the first woman doctor to graduate from the University of Budapest.	IAU · 590269
590335 Mikhailkuzmin	2011 WX_{46}	Mikhail Kuzmin (born 1938), Siberian geologist.	IAU · 590335
590377 Lisacampbell	2011 YG_{2}	Lisa Campbell, Canadian lawyer and first woman appointed president of the Canadian Space Agency.	IAU · 590377
590464 Helenlawson	2012 BB_{57}	Helen Falla née Lawson (1909–2001), the mother of the discoverer.	IAU · 590464
590666 Jianguo	2012 OV_{5}	Taipei Municipal Jianguo High School was established in 1898. It was the first public high school in Taiwan.	IAU · 590666
590739 Miloslavov	2012 TF_{29}	Miloslavov (Hungarian: Annamajor) is a village and municipality in the Senec District, Bratislava Region, in western Slovakia, close to the Hungarian border. The village was first mentioned in historical records in 1332–1337.	IAU · 590739
590761 Fixin	2012 TP_{116}	Fixin, a commune in the Côte-d'Or department in the Bourgogne region in eastern France.	IAU · 590761
590888 Chengda	2012 VB_{53}	National Cheng Kung University (NCKU), also known as "ChengDa" is one of the top public universities of Taiwan, established in 1931.	IAU · 590888
591000 Galaverni	2013 AB_{189}	Matteo Galaverni, Italian diocesan priest and physicist.	IAU · 591000
