= Chaux-la-Lotière =

- Commune
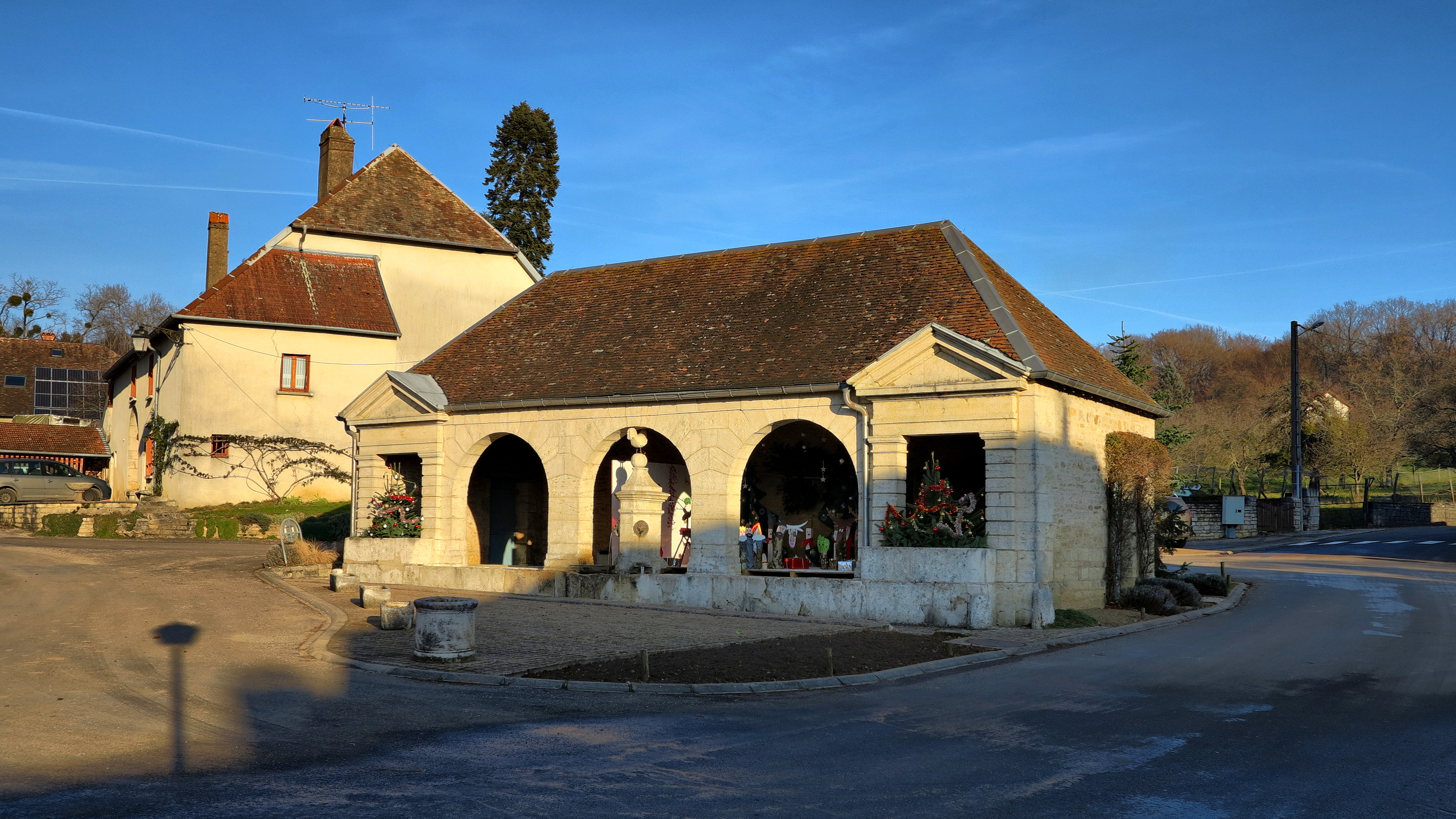
- The wash house in Chaux-la-Lotière
- Location of Chaux-la-Lotière
- Location within France Location within Bourgogne-Franche-Comté
- Coordinates: 47°22′59″N 5°58′51″E
- Country: France
- Region: Bourgogne-Franche-Comté
- Department: Haute-Saône
- Arrondissement: Vesoul
- Canton: Rioz

Government
  - Mayor (2020–2026): Alexandre Ormaux
- Area^{1}: 8.88 km^{2} (3.43 sq mi)
- Highest elevation: 338 m (1,109 ft)
- Lowest elevation: 220 m (720 ft)
- Population (2023): 536
  - Density: 60.4/km^{2} (156/sq mi)
- Time zone: UTC+01:00 (CET)
  - Summer (DST): UTC+02:00 (CEST)
- INSEE/Postal code: 70145 /70190
- ^{1} French Land Register data, which excludes lakes, ponds, glaciers > 1 km^{2} (0.386 sq mi or 247 acres) and river estuaries.

Chaux-la-Lotière (French pronunciation: [ʃo la lɔtjɛʁ]) is a commune in the Haute-Saône department in the region of Bourgogne-Franche-Comté in eastern France. The 20th-century French archaeologist Roland Martin (1912–1997) was born in Chaux-la-Lotière.

== See also ==
- Communes of the Haute-Saône department
