= Roland Martin (archaeologist) =

French art historian and archaeologist (1912–1997)

Roland Martin (French pronunciation: [ʁɔlɑ̃ maʁtɛ̃]; 15 April 1912, Chaux-la-Lotière, Franche-Comté – 14 January 1997, Fixin, Burgundy) was a French archaeologist.

From 1934 to 1938 Martin studied at the Sorbonne and the École normale supérieure. From 1938 until 1946, he was a member of the French School at Athens. From 1936 to 1971, he taught at the University of Dijon, since 1956 as a professor. From 1965 to 1980 he was Directeur d'études at the École pratique des hautes études and from 1971 to 1980 professor of Greek Archaeology at the University Paris I.

A member of the Académie des Inscriptions et Belles-Lettres, from 1958 until 1980 a member of the Centre national de la recherche scientifique, of which he was honored with the CNRS Gold medal in 1981.

Roland Martin's research focus were architecture and urbanism of ancient Greece. For this purpose, but generally also in search of ancient Greek art, he wrote several general surveys. He carried out excavations on the island of Thasos.

== Works ==
- 1964: Le monde grec. (with photos by Henri Stierlin).
- 1965: Manuel d'architecture grecque. Vol. 1. Matériaux et techniques. Picard, Paris.
- 1968: Grèce archaïque. Galimard, Paris (with Jean Charbonneaux and François Villard).
- 1969: La Grèce classique. Gallimard, Paris. (with Jean Charbonneaux and François Villard).
- 1970: Grèce hellenistique. Galimard, Paris (with Jean Charbonneaux and François Villard).
- 1974: L'Urbanisme dans la Grèce antique. 2. Auflage. Picard, Paris.
- 1975: Architektur der frühen Hochkulturen. Belser, Stuttgart, ISBN 3-7630-1701-1 (with Seton Lloyd and Hans Wolfgang Müller).
- 1976: La religion grecque. PUF, Paris; with Henri Metger.
- 1982: L'Acropole d'Athènes. BNP, Paris 1982.
- 1985: Dictionnaire méthodique de l'architecture grecque et romaine. Vol 1. Matériaux, techniques de construction, techniques et formes du décor. École française, Athens (with René Ginouvès inter alia).
- 1987: Griechenland. DVA, Stuttgart, ISBN 3-421-02859-1 (Weltgeschichte der Architektur).
- 1987: Architecture et urbanisme. École française, Athens.
- 1994: L'art grec. Librairie générale française, Paris.

== Bibliography ==
- Metzger, Henri (1998). "Notice sur la vie et les travaux de Roland Martin, membre de l'Académie". Comptes Rendus des Séances de l'Académie des Inscriptions et Belles-Lettres. 142e année (2). Comptes rendus de l'Académie des inscriptions et belles-lettres: 390–396.
- Nicolet, Claude (1997). "Allocution à l'occasion du décès de M. Roland Martin, académicien ordinaire". Comptes rendus des séances de l'Académie des Inscriptions et Belles-Lettres. 141e année (1): 31–33.
