= Fixin =

- Commune
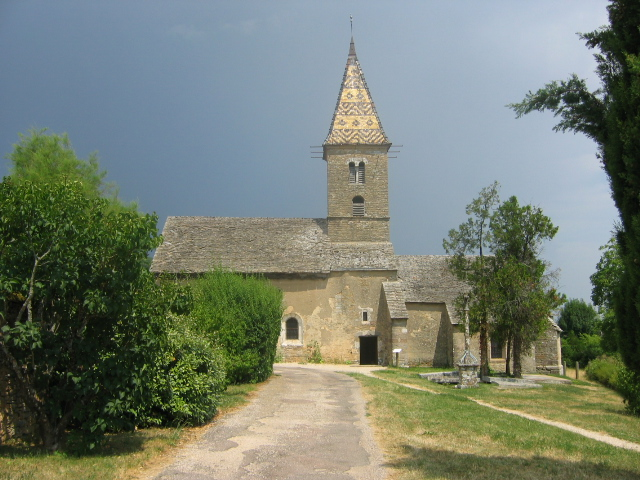
- The church in the hamlet of Fixey

- Coat of arms
- Location of Fixin
- Location within France Location within Bourgogne-Franche-Comté
- Coordinates: 47°14′47″N 4°58′23″E
- Country: France
- Region: Bourgogne-Franche-Comté
- Department: Côte-d'Or
- Arrondissement: Beaune
- Canton: Longvic

Government
  - Mayor (2020–2026): Pascal Rochet
- Area^{1}: 10.12 km^{2} (3.91 sq mi)
- Highest elevation: 565 m (1,854 ft)
- Lowest elevation: 230 m (750 ft)
- Population (2023): 701
  - Density: 69.3/km^{2} (179/sq mi)
- Time zone: UTC+01:00 (CET)
  - Summer (DST): UTC+02:00 (CEST)
- INSEE/Postal code: 21265 /21220
- ^{1} French Land Register data, which excludes lakes, ponds, glaciers > 1 km^{2} (0.386 sq mi or 247 acres) and river estuaries.

Fixin (French pronunciation: [fisɛ̃]) is a commune in the Côte-d'Or department in the Bourgogne region on the Grand Crus route in eastern France. The French archaeologist Roland Martin (1912–1997) died in Fixin.

== Wine ==
Fixin is one of the wine communes of Côte de Nuits.

== Administration ==
List of mayors
Period	Name
2003–2014	Geneviève Peltier
2014–2020	André Arzur
2020–2026	Pascal Rochet

== Population ==
Historical population
Year	Pop.	±% p.a.
1968	566	—
1975	817	+5.38%
1982	883	+1.12%
1990	826	−0.83%
1999	785	−0.56%
2007	758	−0.44%
2012	759	+0.03%
2017	754	−0.13%
2023	701	−1.21%
Source: INSEE

== Sights ==
- Fixey Church (built 10th & 12th century) stands in the middle of the vineyards, a masterpiece of Roman architecture. The oratory of St Anthony and the square bell tower date from 902. The eastern and western parts of the nave were rebuilt in the twelfth and thirteenth centuries. The apse was enlarged in 1720. The tower is now covered in glazed tiles.
- Church of St Martin (12th century)
- The Washhouse (19th century)
- Museum and Park Noisot

== See also ==
- Route des Grands Crus
- Côte de Nuits
