= Vosne-Romanée wine =

Burgundian wine

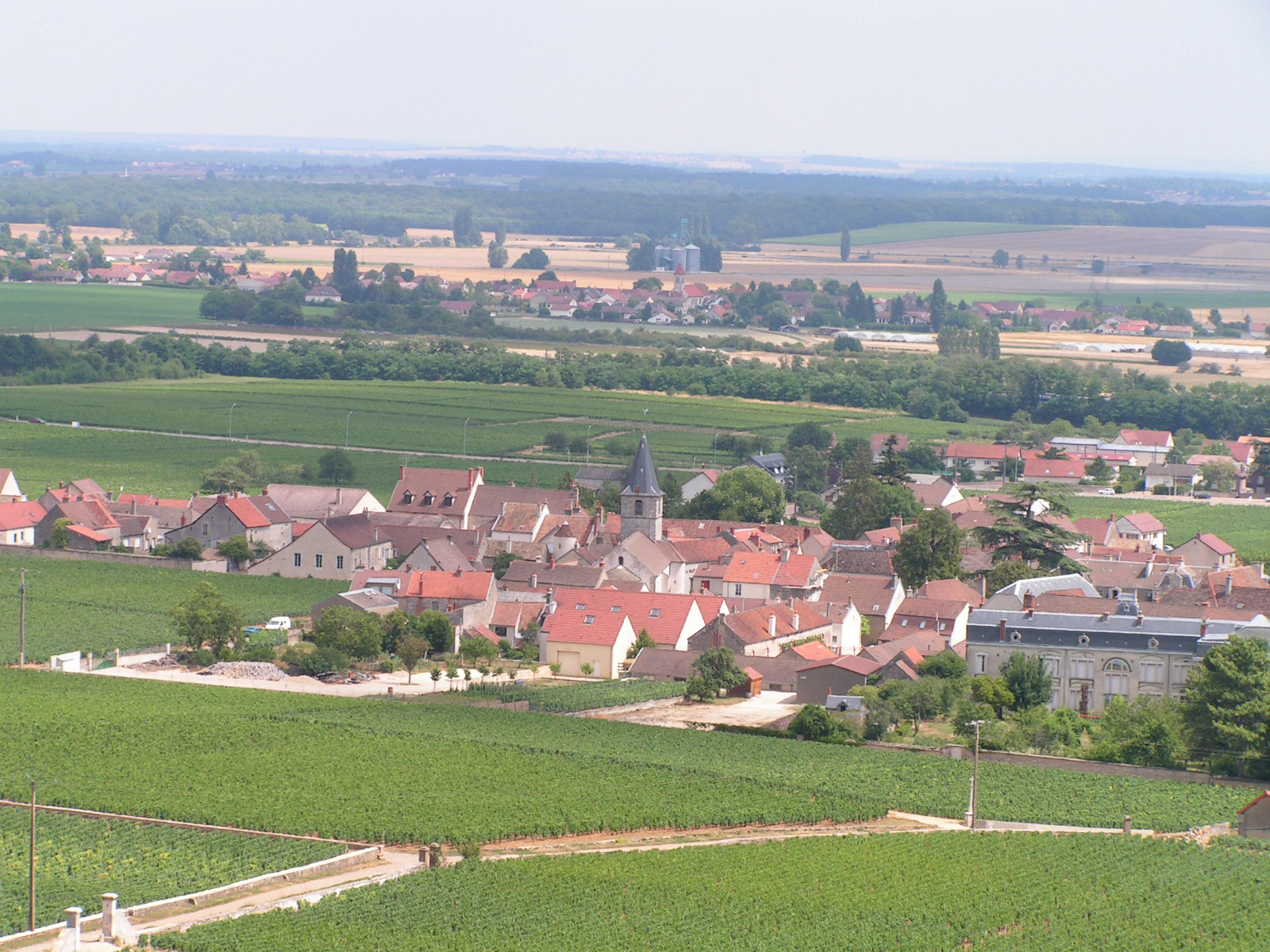
Vosne-Romanée and some of its surrounding vineyards.

Vosne-Romanée wine is produced in the commune of Vosne-Romanée in Côte de Nuits of Burgundy as well as in the neighbouring commune of Flagey-Échezeaux. The Appellation d'origine contrôlée (AOC) Vosne-Romanée may only be used for red wine with Pinot noir as the main grape. There are a total of 15 Premier Cru vineyards in the two communes, as well as six Grand Cru vineyards in Vosne-Romanée and two in Flagey-Échezeaux. These Grand Cru vineyards include Burgundy's most iconic, sought after and expensive red wines, with Romanée-Conti of Domaine de la Romanée-Conti at the pinnacle: "There can be little doubt that in the firmament of the Cote de nuits, Vosne-Romanée is the brightest star."

There is no Flagey-Échezeaux appellation; the village and Premier Cru vineyards of this commune are part of the Vosne-Romanée AOC.

== Production ==
In 2008, 153.6 hectares (380 acres) of vineyard surface was in production for Vosne-Romanée wine at village and Premier Cru level, and 5,955 hectoliters of wine was produced, corresponding to almost 800,000 bottles. Within both communes, there are also vineyards (on the flatter land to the east of the N74 road) which are only entitled to the regional Bourgogne appellation.

== Terroir ==
A majority of the vineyards are located to the east of the town and are only eligible for the village appellation: "97 ha, mostly of thin but well-drained clay-limestone soils, covered with pebbles and limestone scree.These produce wines which balance depth and richness with elegance and breed; Often described as silky, these wines are marked by finesse and perfume, which, along with their natural power, allow them to age well. [The premier crus in Vosne] occupy some 57 ha, often on slopes of up to 15%, and are mainly exposed to either the east or south-east. These soils tend to have less dept and contain a higher proportion of limestone than those in the village vineyards and the topsoil is mainly scree, making for excellent drainage. Quality is consistently high but there are marked differences in style."

== Varietal composition ==
The AOC regulations allow up to 15 per cent total of Chardonnay, Pinot blanc and Pinot gris as accessory grapes in the red wines, but this is not practiced to any greater extent. The allowed base yield is 40 hectoliter per hectare and the grapes must reach a maturity of at least 10.5 per cent potential alcohol for village-level wine and 11.0 per cent for Premier Cru wine.

== Characteristics ==
The style of Vosne-Romanée wines is often described as a combination of elegance and power. The best (and most expensive) Grand Cru wines of this village are often seen as the ultimate expression of Pinot noir: "Vosne, the pearl of the Cote! the vineyards assembled here are the choice of its greatest crus: Romanée and Richebourg, Tache and Suchots, noble wines of velvet, fire, and exquisite grace. Burgundy has made nothing better than this small corner where it has reunited its enchantments, and put into the wines the tender generosity of its genius" "Vosne-Romanée is the greatest Pinot noir village on earth ... style is for wines which are rich, austere, masculine and aristocratic" "They should combine ... a delicate but well-defined bouquet, a stylish, velvety depth of flavour and lingering but firm finish ... Racy, elegant wines" They often require significant cellaring to develop fully. "this magnificent vineyard which, in its ensemble, is the premier of the Cote-d'Or. Body, mellowness, extreme finesse and heightened bouquet, it unites all the desirable qualities. This eulogy without reservation is contested by no one."

== Premiers Crus ==
A number of climats in the Vosne-Romanée AOC are classified as Premier Cru vineyards; 12 in Vosne-Romanée and 3 in Flagey-Échezeaux. Their wines are designated Vosne-Romanée Premier Cru + vineyard name, such as Vosne-Romanée Premier Cru Les Suchots. They may also be labelled just Vosne-Romanée Premier Cru, in which case it is possible to blend wine from several Premier Cru vineyards within the AOC. In 2007, these vineyards totalled 54.85 hectares (135.5 acres).

"Quality is consistently high but there are marked differences in style. ... in the top rank but in a fresher syle due to their high altitude are Reignots, Cros Parantoux, Beaux Monts and Brulées. In a similar vein but less intense is Les Rouges"

In the commune of Vosne-Romanée:

- Les Beaux Monts
- Les Suchots-- "finer than many a grand cru Echézeaux which it abuts ... rich, sumptuous wines of the highest quality"
- Aux Brûlées-- "crisp and fresh ... clean and pure with a lovely mineral quality"
- La Croix Rameau-- "rich, sumptuous wines of the highest quality"
- Clos des Réas-- "always shows well when young but has the potential to age gracefully"
- Les Gaudichots—deep clay-rich soil "gives a wine well-endowed with tannin. It is a rich, dense, chewy wine with masses of dark fruits finely balanced by along, fresh finish"
- Les Chaumes-- "softer and less intense" [than Malconsorts]
- Aux Malconsorts-- "on the Nuits border, has a touch of the burly of its southern neighbour"
- Au-dessus des Malconsorts
- Cros Parantoux
- Aux Reignots
- Les Petits Monts

In the commune of Flagey-Échezeaux:

- Les Beaux Monts
- Les Rouges
- En Orveaux

== Grands Crus ==
Vosne-Romanée itself has six Grand Cru vineyards, La Tâche of 6.06 hectares (15.0 acres) in 2008, La Grande Rue of 1.65 hectares (4.1 acres), La Romanée of 0.85 hectares (2.1 acres), Romanée-Conti of 1.81 hectares (4.5 acres), Romanée-Saint-Vivant of 9.44 hectares (23.3 acres) and Richebourg of 8.03 hectares (19.8 acres), and Flagey-Échezeaux has two further, Echézeaux of 37.69 hectares (93.1 acres) and Grands Échezeaux of 9.14 hectares (22.6 acres). Romanée-Conti and La Tâche are monopoles of Domaine de la Romanée-Conti, La Grande Rue is a monopole of Domaine Lamarche and La Romanée is a monopole of Comte Liger-Belair.
