= La Tâche AOC =

Grand Cru vineyard in Burgundy, France

Coordinates: 47°09′33″N 4°57′04″E

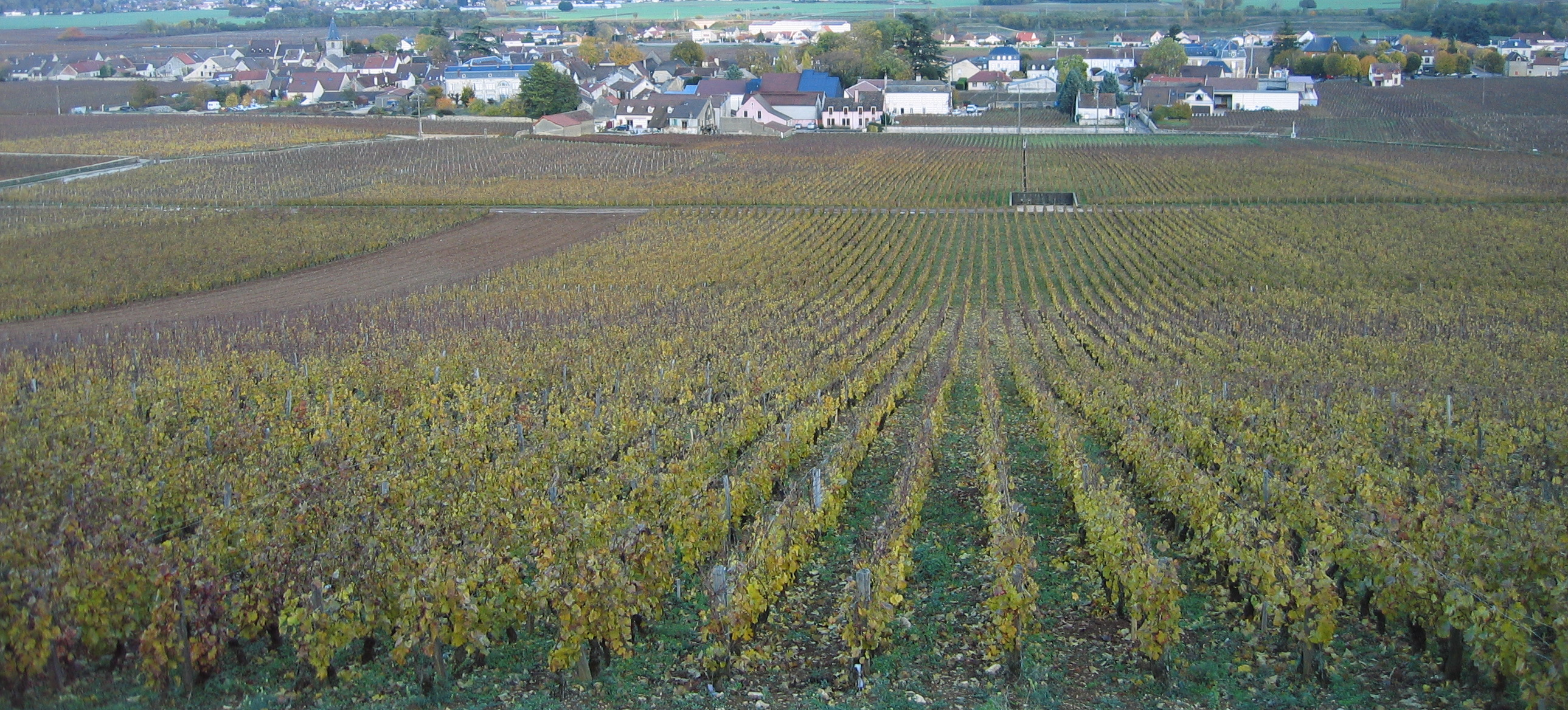
The La Tâche vineyard in autumn.

La Tâche (French pronunciation: [la taʃ]) is an Appellation d'origine contrôlée (AOC) and Grand Cru vineyard for red wine in the Côte de Nuits subregion of Burgundy, with Pinot noir as the main grape variety. It is situated within the commune of Vosne-Romanée and is a monopole of the winery Domaine de la Romanée-Conti. La Tâche borders on La Grande Rue in the north, and mostly on Vosne-Romanée Premier Cru vineyards in the east, south and west. The AOC was created in 1936.

== History ==
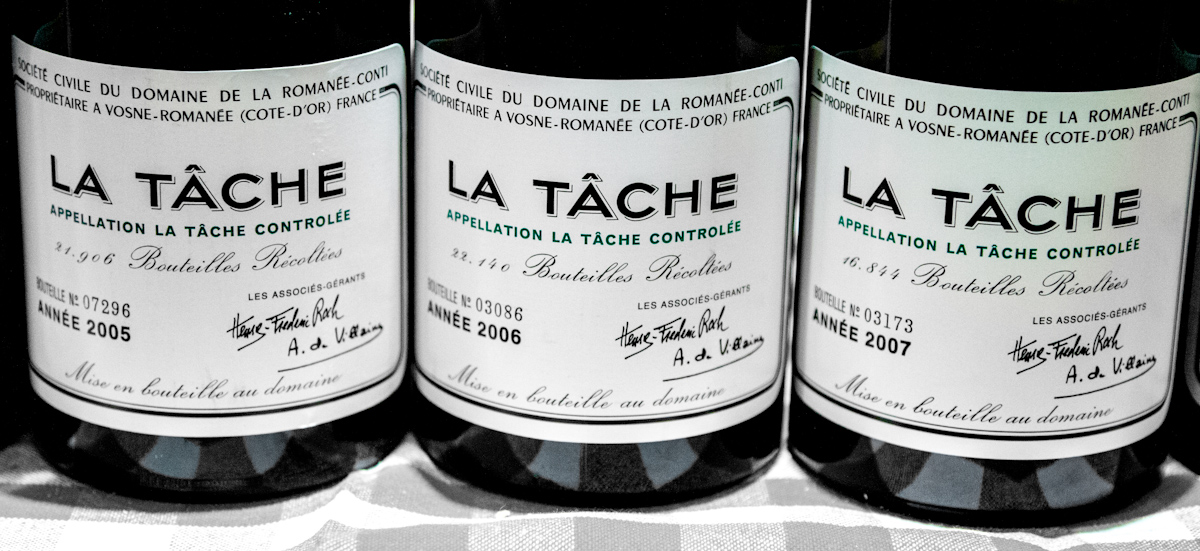
Domaine de la Romanée-Conti La Tâche labels from 2005, 2006 and 2007.

The vineyard received its current name, which means "task", when the de Croonembourg family bought it from the Abbey Saint-Vivant in 1631. At this time, the vineyard called La Tâche covered a slightly smaller area than the current AOC. The de Croonembourgs had simultaneously purchased Romanée-Conti, which at that time was named La Romanée. In 1760, both of these vineyards were sold by André de Croonembourg and ended up in the hands of different buyers. At this time, La Tâche came to fame, since Louis François I de Bourbon, the Prince of Conti who had bought and renamed Romanée-Conti, kept that vineyard's production for his own consumption, leaving La Tâche as the finest commercially available Vosne wine.

In 1791, La Tâche was bought by the Marey family, which were also vineyard owners in Romanée-Saint-Vivant. In 1793, following the French Revolution, La Tâche was sequestered by the state, and sold 1794, simultaneously with Romanée-Conti.

In 1855, when Dr. Jules Lavalle published his classification of the Burgundy vineyards, La Tâche was one of those placed in the highest of five categories, tête de cuvée.

Up until 1932, the neighbouring vineyard of Les Gaudichots could be sold either under its own name or as La Tâche. In this year the Domaine de la Romanée-Conti, which owned vineyards in Les Gaudichots applied to have it merged into La Tâche. This was opposed by Liger-Belair who owned the smaller, and historical La Tâche. However, Liger-Belair lost and most of Les Gaudichots was absorbed into La Tâche, except for some parts that were deemed to be of Premier Cru rather than Grand Cru quality, and which have remained a separate vineyard under the name Vosnée-Romanée Les Gaudichots, consisting of three discontinuous plots. In 1933, following the death of the Comtesse Liger-Belair in 1931, Liger-Belair's vineyards had to be auctioned off, including their La Tâche holding, and it ended up with Domaine de la Romanée-Conti.

Since 1985, Domaine de la Romanée-Conti has practiced organic farming in the vineyard.

== Production ==
In 2008, 5.03 hectares (12.4 acres) of vineyard surface was in production within the AOC, and 95 hectoliters of wine was produced, corresponding to just under 12,700 bottles. The five-year average annual production of the period 2003–2007 was somewhat higher, 151 hl, corresponding to just over 20,000 bottles.

== AOC regulations ==
The main grape variety for La Tâche is Pinot noir. The AOC regulations also allow up to 15 per cent total of Chardonnay, Pinot blanc and Pinot gris as accessory grapes, but this is practically never used for any Burgundy Grand Cru vineyard. The allowed base yield is 35 hectoliter per hectare, a minimum planting density of 9,000 vines per hectare and a minimum grape maturity of 11.5 per cent potential alcohol is required. The actual yield over the period 2003-2007 was 30 hl/ha.

== See also ==
- List of Burgundy Grand Crus
- Domaine de la Romanée-Conti
- 1855 Classification
