= Romanée-Saint-Vivant =

Grand Cru vineyard in Burgundy, France

Coordinates: 47°09′44″N 4°57′10″E

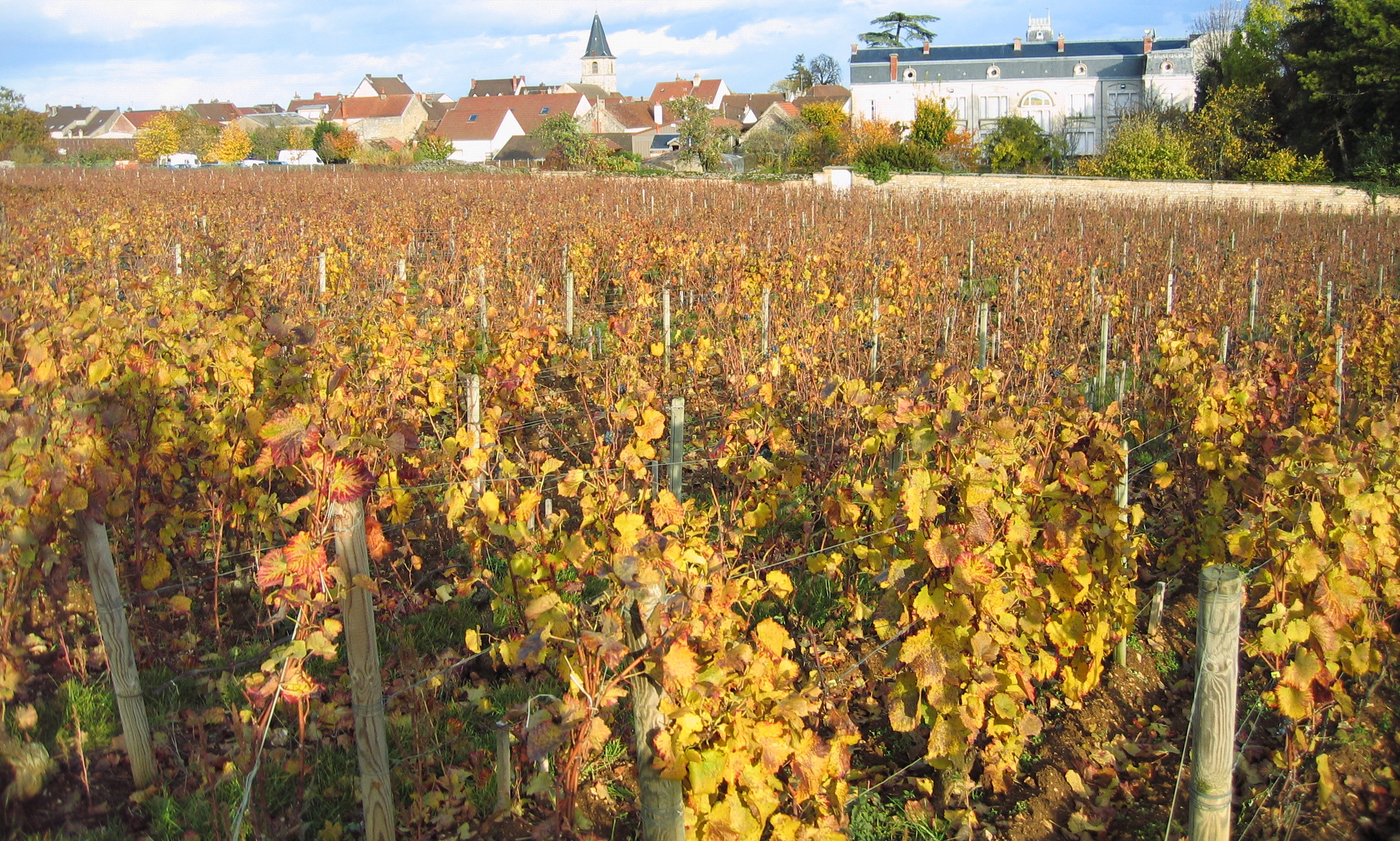
The southeastern part of Romanée-Saint-Vivant in autumn

Romanée-Saint-Vivant is an Appellation d'origine contrôlée (AOC) and Grand Cru vineyard for red wine in the Côte de Nuits subregion of Burgundy, with Pinot noir as the main grape variety. It is situated within the commune of Vosne-Romanée. La Romanée borders on La Grande Rue in the south, Romanée-Conti and Richebourg in the west, Vosne-Romanée Premier Cru vineyards in the north (Les Suchots) and in the east (La Croix-Rameau and Les Gaudichots) and also the village Vosne-Romanée itself in the east. The AOC was created in 1936. It takes its name from the Abbey of Saint Vivant, which in medieval times owned several vineyards among the Vosne-Romanée Grands Crus.

== History ==
There are several different vineyard owners in Romanée-Saint-Vivant today, although Domaine de la Romanée-Conti is the largest. The entire vineyard of Romanée Saint-Vivant was bought in 1791 by Nicolas-Joseph Marey, son-in-law of the geometer Gaspard Monge, when it was up for sale after the French Revolution after much land had been sequestered. After keeping it as a monopole for over 100 years, the Marey-Monge family sold off the southwestern part of the vineyard (lieu-dit Le Clos des Quatre Journeaux) to the Latour family in 1898, which in turn later resold around half of it. At a later stage, another portion in the northern part of the vineyard was sold to Charles Noellat. In 1966, the last member of the Marey-Monge family leased the remaining 5.28 hectares (13.0 acres) to Domaine de la Romanée-Conti, and also gave them an option to be first buyers if the vineyard would come up for sale. In 1988, the vineyard was bought from the Neyroud family, which had inherited it from Ms Marey-Monge. This last deal was financed by the sale and leaseback of the domaine's holdings in Échezeaux and parts of Grands Échezeaux, as well as the sale of some Premier Cru and village level vineyards in Vosne-Romanée. Wine from the time when Domaine de la Romanée-Conti leased it, rather than owned it, also has the name Marey-Monge on the label.

== Production ==
In 2008, 9.30 hectares (23.0 acres) of vineyard surface was in production within the AOC, and 237 hectoliter of wine was produced, corresponding to just under 32,000 bottles.

== AOC regulations ==
The main grape variety for Romanée-Saint-Vivant is Pinot noir. The AOC regulations also allow up to 15 per cent total of Chardonnay, Pinot blanc and Pinot gris as accessory grapes, but this is practically never used for any Burgundy Grand Cru vineyard. The allowed base yield is 35 hectoliter per hectare, a minimum planting density of 9,000 vines per hectare and a minimum grape maturity of 11.5 per cent potential alcohol is required.

== See also ==
- List of Burgundy Grand Crus
