= Domaine Lamarche =

Burgundian winery

Domaine Lamarche (Domaine François Lamarche) is a winery in the Burgundian village of Vosne-Romanée. The domaine was founded in 1797.

Its vineyard holdings include Clos Vougeot, Echezeaux, Grands Echezeaux, and the monopole La Grande Rue.
