= Vougeot wine =

Vougeot wine is produced in the French village of Vougeot in Côte de Nuits of Burgundy. The Appellation d'origine contrôlée (AOC) Vougeot may be used for red and white wine with respectively Pinot noir and Chardonnay as the main grape variety. A characteristic of Vougeot is that most of the commune's vineyard surface is taken up by its single Grand Cru vineyard, Clos de Vougeot, which at 49.86 hectares (123.2 acres) is the largest Grand Cru of Côte de Nuits. Of the rest, most is classified as Premier Cru, leaving village-level Vougeot wine a rare occurrence, mostly restricted to a small area of flat land immediately to the east of the N74 road, but inside the commune.

Other than Clos de Vougeot, in 2008, there were 15.87 hectares (39.2 acres) of vineyard surface was in production for Vougeot wine at village and Premier Cru level, and 526 hectoliters of wine was produced, of which 372 hectoliter red wine and 154 hectoliter white wine. Some 3.87 hectares (9.6 acres) of this area was used for the white wines in 2007. The amount produced corresponds to 70,000 bottles; 50,000 bottles of red wine and slightly over 20,000 bottles of white wine.

The AOC regulations allow up to 15 per cent total of Chardonnay, Pinot blanc and Pinot gris as accessory grapes in the red wines, but this not very often practiced. For white wines, both Chardonnay and Pinot Blanc are allowed, but most wines are likely to be 100% Chardonnay. The allowed base yield is 40 hectoliter per hectare of red wine and 45 for white wine. The grapes must reach a maturity of at least 10.5 per cent potential alcohol for village-level red wine, 11.0 per cent for village-level white wine and Premier Cru red wine, and 11.5 per cent for Premier Cru white wine.

== Premiers Crus ==
There are four climats in Vougeot classified as Premier Cru vineyards: Les Cras, La Vigne Blanche, Les Petits Vougeots, and Clos de la Perrière. They are situated to the north of Clos de Vougeot and west of the village. Their wines are designated Vougeot Premier Cru + vineyard name, or may labelled just Vougeot Premier Cru, in which case it is possible to blend wine from several Premier Cru vineyards within the AOC.

In 2007, 12.48 hectares (30.8 acres) of the total Vougeot vineyard surface consisted of Premier Cru vineyards, of which 9.44 hectares (23.3 acres) red and 3.04 hectares (7.5 acres) white Vougeot Premier Cru.

Grapes from Clos de Vougeot may be declassified to Vougeot Premier Cru. This is of particular interest since Clos de Vougeot is a red wines-only AOC, while Vougeot AOC allows white wines. Thus, white wine from Chardonnay grapes grown inside the walls of Clos de Vougeot is sold as white Vougeot Premier Cru.
