= Flagey-Echézeaux =

- Commune
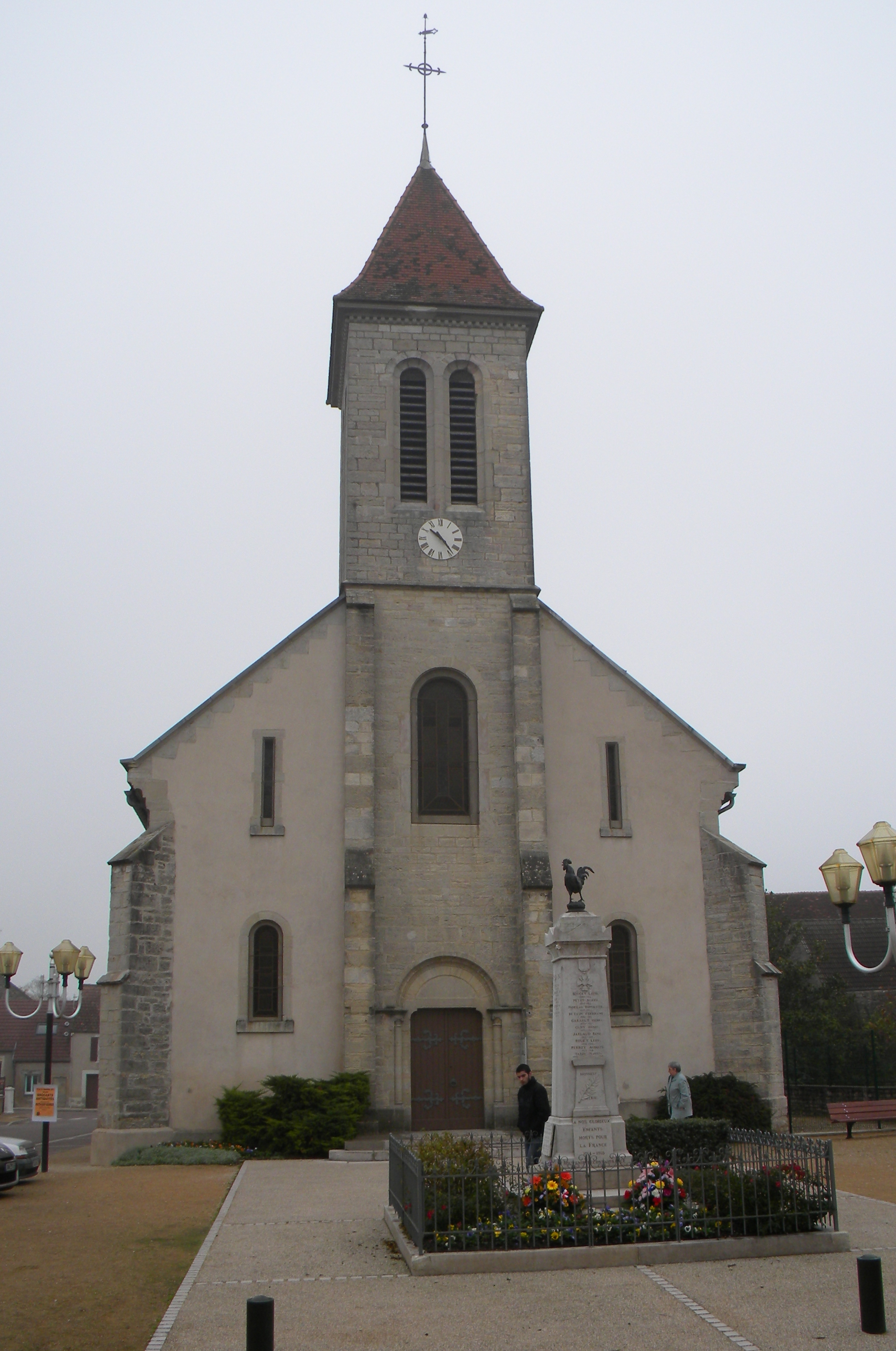
- The church in Flagey-Echézeaux

- Coat of arms
- Location of Flagey-Echézeaux
- Location within France Location within Bourgogne-Franche-Comté
- Coordinates: 47°10′01″N 4°58′54″E
- Country: France
- Region: Bourgogne-Franche-Comté
- Department: Côte-d'Or
- Arrondissement: Beaune
- Canton: Nuits-Saint-Georges

Government
  - Mayor (2020–2026): Jean-François Collardot
- Area^{1}: 8.06 km^{2} (3.11 sq mi)
- Elevation: 223 m (732 ft)
- Highest elevation: 400 m (1,300 ft)
- Lowest elevation: 203 m (666 ft)
- Population (2023): 485
  - Density: 60.2/km^{2} (156/sq mi)
- Time zone: UTC+01:00 (CET)
  - Summer (DST): UTC+02:00 (CEST)
- INSEE/Postal code: 21267 /21640
- ^{1} French Land Register data, which excludes lakes, ponds, glaciers > 1 km^{2} (0.386 sq mi or 247 acres) and river estuaries.

Flagey-Echézeaux (French pronunciation: [flaʒɛ ɛʃezo]) is a commune in the Côte-d'Or department in eastern France.

== Population ==
Historical population
Year	Pop.	±% p.a.
1968	236	—
1975	320	+4.45%
1982	430	+4.31%
1990	448	+0.51%
1999	494	+1.09%
2007	501	+0.18%
2012	473	−1.14%
2017	473	+0.00%
2023	485	+0.42%
Source: INSEE

== Wine ==
Flagey-Echézeaux is home to two Grand Cru vineyards, Échezeaux and Grands Échezeaux. Most of the other vineyards of the commune are part of the Vosne-Romanée appellation, and there is no "Flagey-Echézeaux" appellation.

== See also ==
- Échezeaux
- Route des Grands Crus
