= Richebourg (wine) =

Grand Cru vineyard in Burgundy, France

Coordinates: 47°09′47″N 4°56′59″E

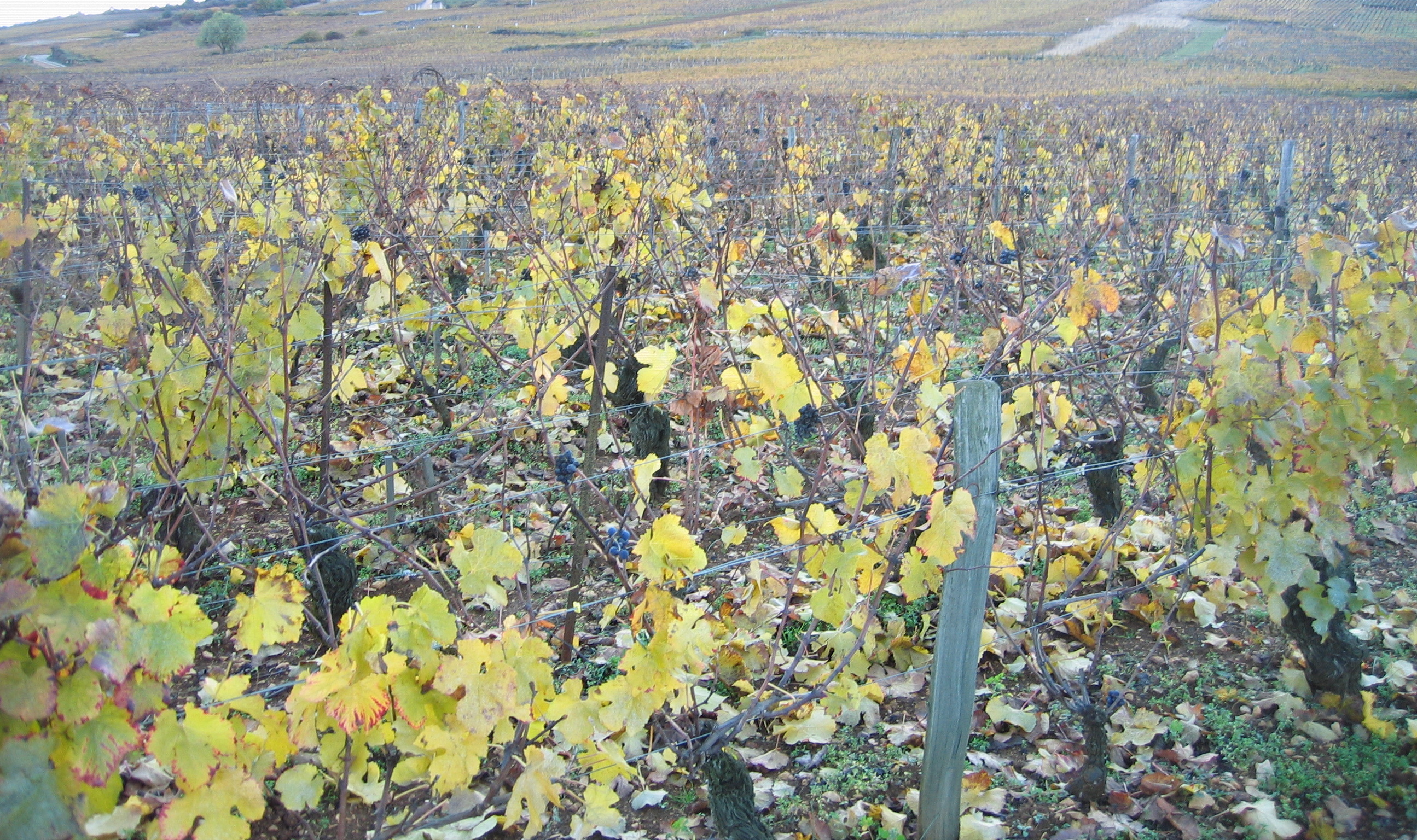
Richebourg in autumn

Richebourg is an Appellation d'origine contrôlée (AOC) and Grand Cru vineyard for red wine in the Côte de Nuits subregion of Burgundy, with Pinot noir as the main grape variety. It is situated within the commune of Vosne-Romanée, and borders La Romanée and Romanée-Conti in the south, Romanée-Saint-Vivant in the east and Vosne-Romanée Premier Cru vineyards in the north and west. The AOC was created in 1936.

== Production ==
In 2008, 7.40 hectares (18.3 acres) of vineyard surface was in production within the AOC, and 198 hectoliter of wine was produced, corresponding to a little over 26,000 bottles. This wine is mentioned in the film Sideways.

== Characteristics ==
"Richebourg has more opulence than finesse ... Richebourg is the more massive and La Romanée-Conti finer"

== AOC regulations ==
The main grape variety for Richebourg is Pinot noir. The AOC regulations also allow up to 15 per cent total of Chardonnay, Pinot blanc and Pinot gris as accessory grapes, but this is practically never used for any Burgundy Grand Cru vineyard. The allowed base yield is 35 hectoliter per hectare, a minimum planting density of 9,000 vines per hectare and a minimum grape maturity of 11.5 per cent potential alcohol is required.

== Producers ==
There are several different vineyard owners in Richebourg, Domaine de la Romanée-Conti with 3.51 hectares (8.7 acres) being the most famous.

== See also ==
- List of Burgundy Grand Crus
