= Clos de Vougeot =

French wine

Coordinates: 47°10′29.72″N 4°57′19.74″E

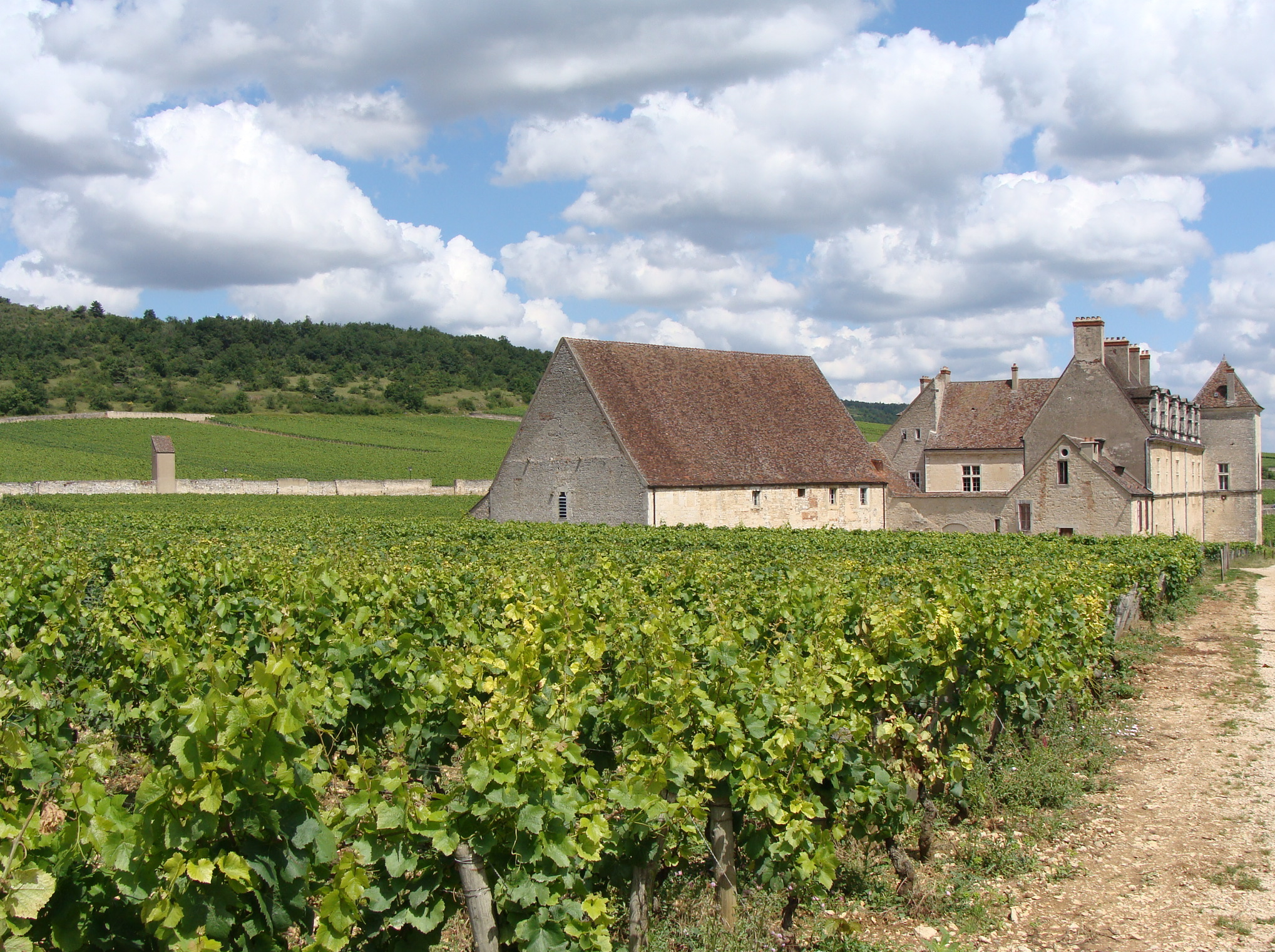
Château du Clos de Vougeot

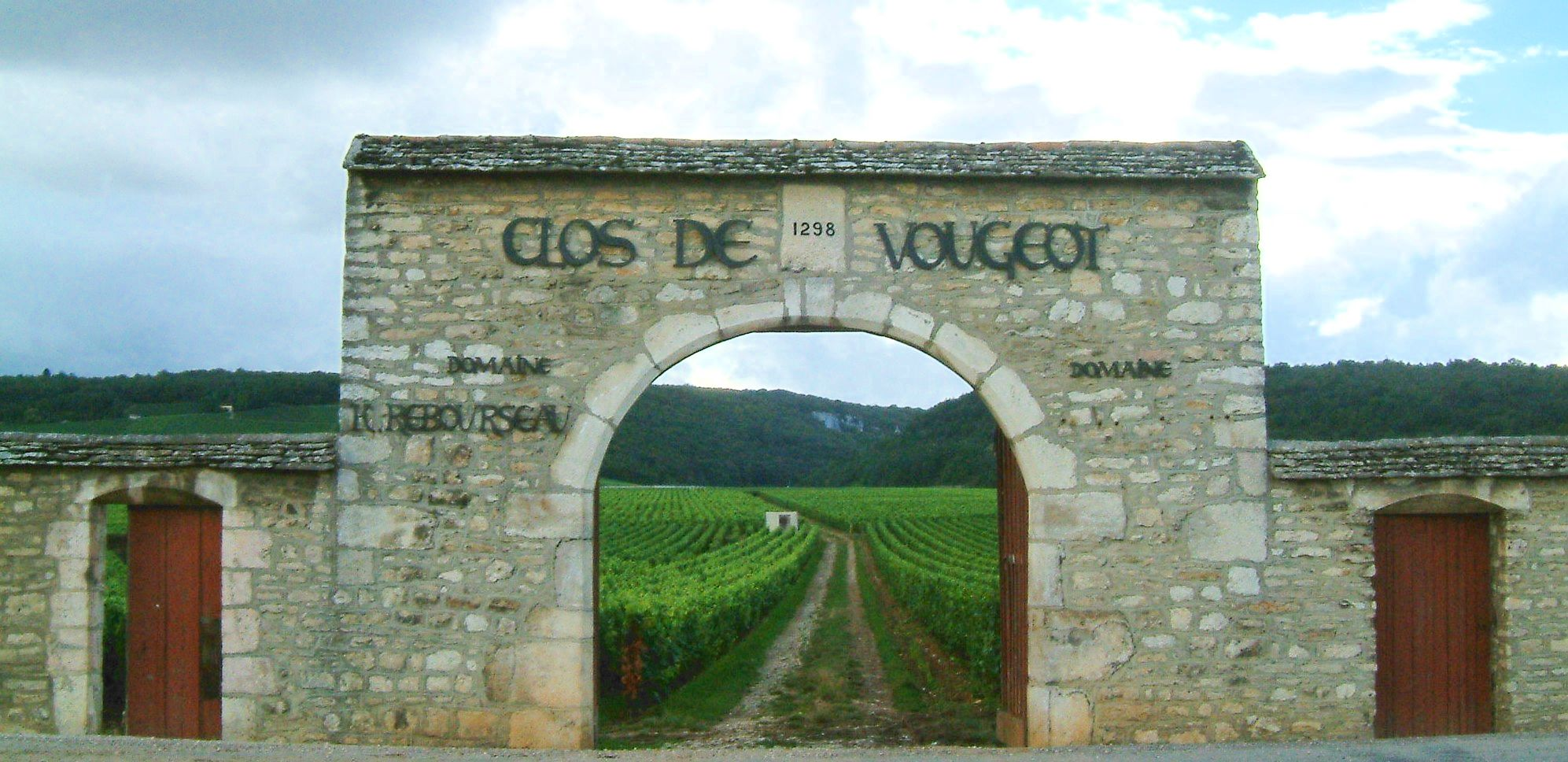
One of the gates of the wall surrounding Clos de Vougeot

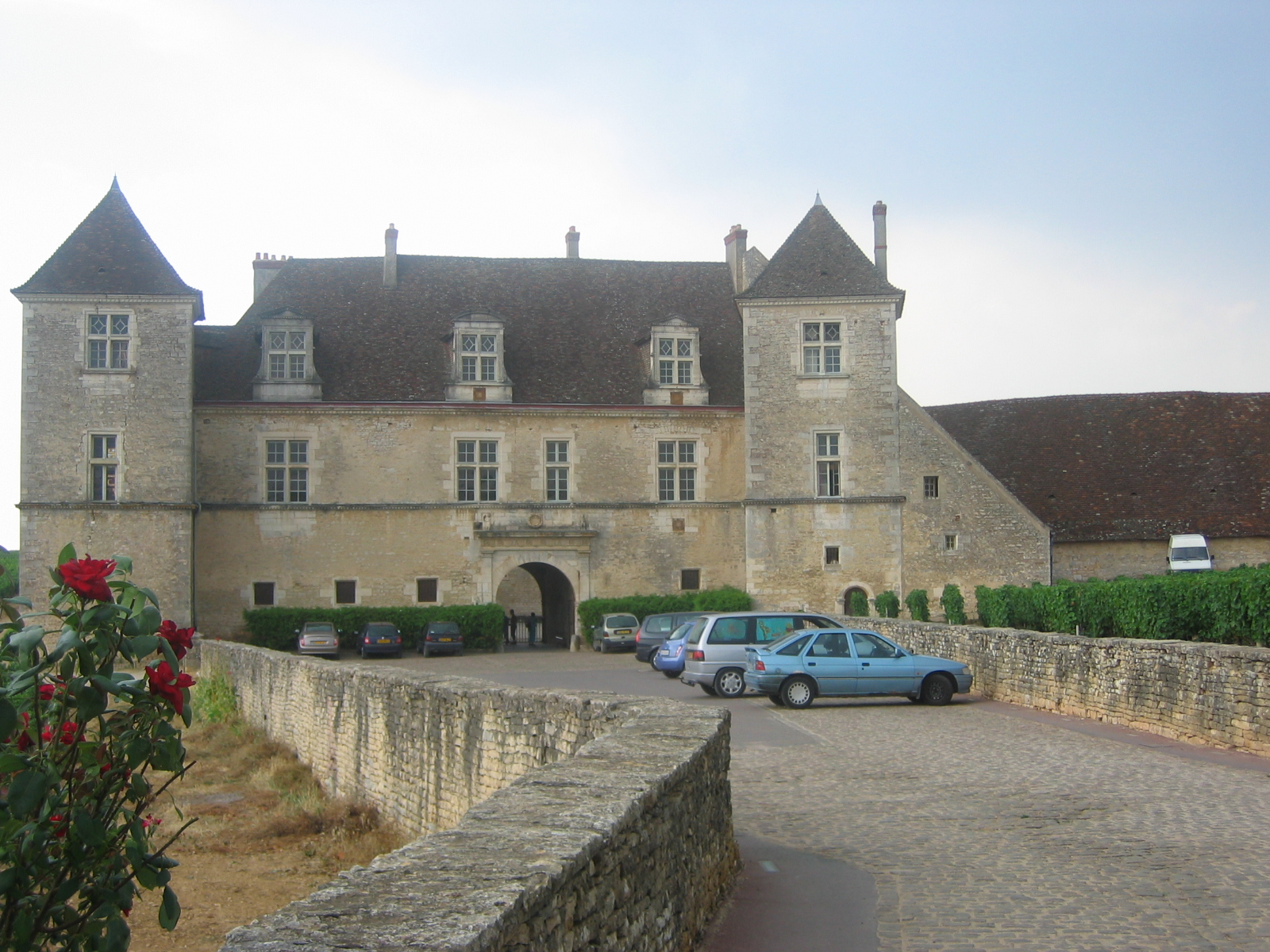
Château du Clos de Vougeot

Clos de Vougeot, also known as Clos Vougeot, is a wall-enclosed vineyard, a clos, in the Burgundy wine region, and an Appellation d'origine contrôlée (AOC) for red wine from this vineyard. It was named for the River Vouge, which is in fact only a stream separating the village Vougeot from Chambolle-Musigny. At 50.6 hectares (125 acres), Clos de Vougeot is the largest single vineyard in Côte de Nuits entitled to the grand cru designation, while Corton in Côte de Beaune is the largest grand cru in Burgundy as a whole.

== History ==
The Clos de Vougeot vineyard was created by Cistercian monks of Cîteaux Abbey, the order's mother abbey. The land making up the vineyard was purchased by the Cistercians, or donated to them, from the 12th century to the early 14th century. The initial vineyard consisted of donations in 1109 to 1115. The vineyard was complete, and a wall had been built around it, by the year 1336. It served as the flagship vineyard of the Cistercians, and has been a highly recognised name for centuries.

Château du Clos de Vougeot, situated inside the wall, was added in 1551 by rebuilding and enlarging a small chapel and some other buildings previously existing at the site. From 1945, this building has served as headquarters of the Confrérie des Chevaliers du Tastevin.

In the French Revolution, all vineyard possessions were taken from the church by the French state, and sold off to private buyers. In 1818, the château and vineyards of Clos de Vougeot was bought by Julien-Jules Ouvrard, who also bought the Romanée-Conti vineyard in 1819. Ouvrard later moved to Château de Gilly, another former Cistercian property, but continued to take an interest in the vineyards of Clos de Vougeot, which was then a monopole. After Ouvrard's death, Clos de Vougeot passed to his three heirs, but continued to be operated as a single property until 1889, when the heirs put it up for sale. It was bought by six Burgundy wine merchants, leading to a subdivided vineyard for the first time since its creation more than 700 years earlier. After that, the holdings have been progressively subdivided by inheritance and land sales. In the early 2000s, Clos de Vougeot was split among more than 80 owners.

One of the 1889 vineyard buyers, Léonce Bocquet, also bought the château, and initiated renovations of a part of it. In 1920, the château came into the hands of Etienne Camuzet, who was vineyard owner in Vosne-Romanée and politician. He put it to the disposal of the Confrérie des Chevaliers du Tastevin, and on November 29, 1944 sold it to the organisation Société civile des Amis du Château du Clos de Vougeot ("Friends of the Château du Clos de Vougeot"), which gave the Confrérie des Chevaliers du Tastevin a 99-year lease on the property.

== Layout and geography of the vineyard ==
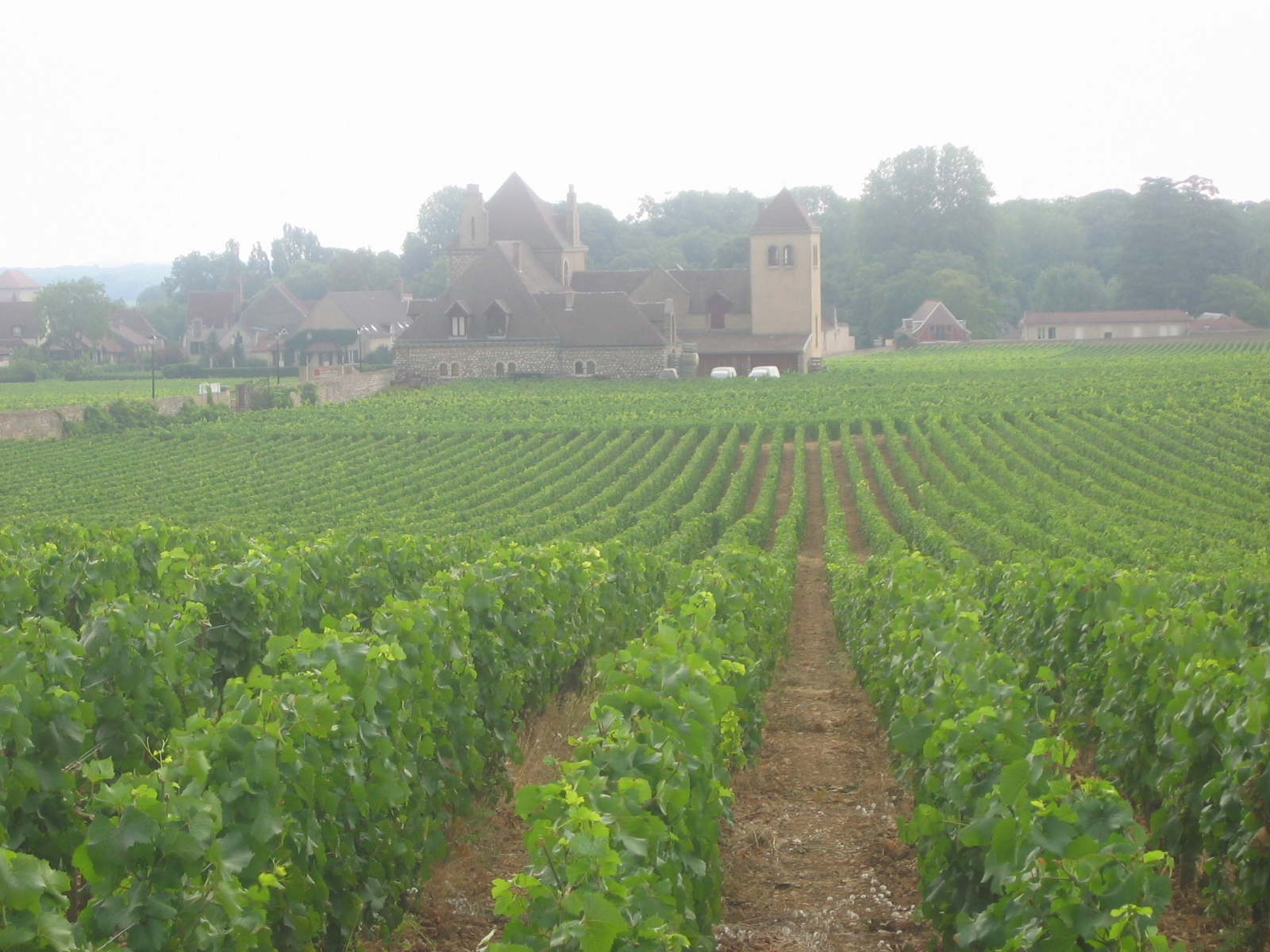
A view inside the vineyard

The vineyard is roughly rectangular, gently sloping from a corner in the northwest down toward the south and east. The château is situated in this corner. Since the vineyard is large and situated in a slope, it is not homogeneous from a geological point of view. The soils have typically been a determining factor in determining the classification and extent of other Burgundy vineyards, while in this case, the wall-enclosed area has been classified in the same way.

The soils of Clos de Vougeot generally considered as those giving the best wines are those surrounding the château in the top corner. The soils here are light chalky and gravelly soils on oolitic limestone, with good drainage. This part of the vineyard borders to the grand cru vineyards Musigny and Grands Échezeaux.

The soils of the middle part of the vineyard consist of softer limestone with clay and some gravel, and moderate drainage. Most other Côte de Nuits vineyards situated at this level of the slope are classified premier cru, but one part of the grand cru Échezeaux borders on the middle part of Clos de Vougeot.

The bottom part of the vineyard, situated in the east and bordering the N74, the main road of the area, consists of humus-rich alluvial clay and is almost flat, with poor drainage. This part of the vineyard borders village level vineyards in the south and partially in the east, mostly regional-level vineyards in the east, on the other side of the N74, and some Vougeot premier cru vineyards in the north. All other grand cru vineyards of the Côte de Nuits are situated higher up in the slope, typically in its middle part, and no other grand cru vineyard stretches down to the N74 road.

Of the AOC's 50.6 ha, 47.3 hectares (117 acres) are in production.

== Regulations ==
Clos de Vougeot is an AOC for red wine produced from Pinot noir. The INAO appellation rules nevertheless allow mixing in up to 15 percent of Pinot blanc, Pinot gris or Chardonnay. In principle, wines from any still existing plantations of Renevey are also allowed, but replantation of this variety has been forbidden since 1938.

The allowed base yield is 35 hectoliter per hectare. The grapes must reach a maturity corresponding to a sugar content of at least 189 grams per liter of grape must and 11.5 per cent alcohol by volume. When chaptalization is allowed, the alcohol level after chaptalization may not exceed 14.5 per cent.

Wines from Clos de Vougeot are also allowed the appellation Vougeot Premier Cru, if they fail to meet the standards of the grand cru itself. The Vougeot Premier Cru regulations are slightly less restrictive when it comes to yield and grape maturity, and more importantly, also allow the production of white wine from Chardonnay and Pinot Blanc. Thus, white wine that originates from within the Clos de Vougeot vineyard can be sold as white Vougeot Premier Cru, but not under the Clos de Vougeot AOC.

== Wines ==
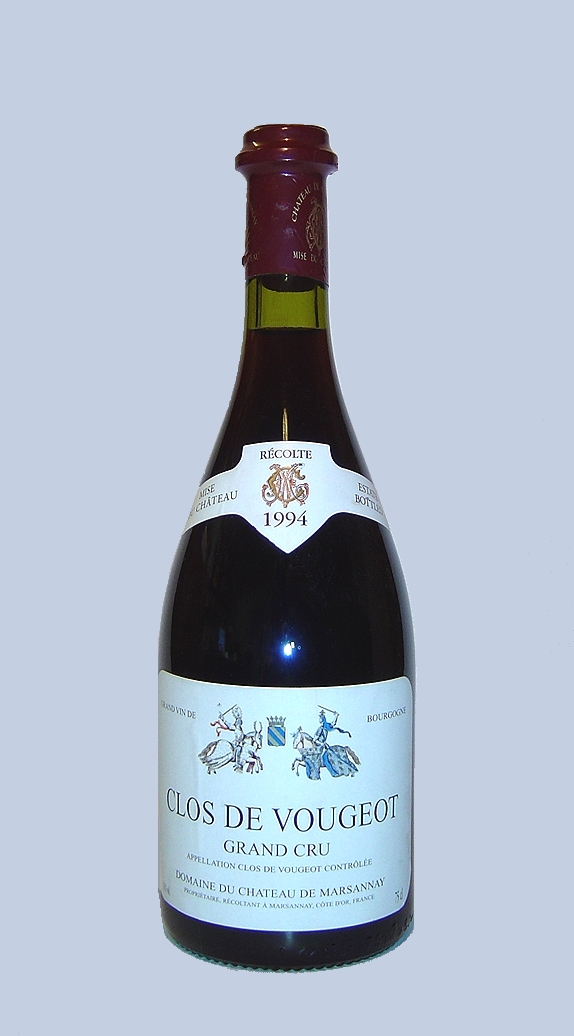
A bottle of Clos de Vougeot wine. Notice the Grand Cru designation on the label.

Both the geological heterogeneity of Clos de Vougeot, and the bewildering array of many small vineyard holders, contribute to making wines produced under the Clos de Vougeot AOC designation very variable in style and quality. Very fine wine of classic quality as well as very mediocre wines are produced here.

The wines of Clos de Vougeot rose to fame when the Cistercians tended the entire vineyard and produced the wine. In producing Clos de Vougeot, the Cistercians first produced cuvées from the different parts of the vineyard, and then blended them to produce a high-class wine. Typically, wine from the top and middle parts would be used, and only sometimes would the bottom part be used for the final Clos de Vougeot wine. Wine from lower down the slope can be better in dry years, so this blending practice allowed the production of a wine that should have been consistent in quality.

Since the entire area inside the wall is part of the Clos de Vougeot AOC, wines from every plot of it is entitled to the grand cru designation. Wineries which only have holdings in the lower part of the vineyard are unlikely to be able to produce wine which represents typical Burgundy grand cru quality, and it is far from certain that they will be able to match many producers' premier cru wines. However, since the grand cru designation is both a matter of pride and profitability, wines are likely to be marketed as Clos de Vougeot AOC.

The best Clos de Vougeot wines, when produced in a classical style, are typically dense when young, and robust rather than elegant in style. After some ten years of cellaring, however, Clos de Vougeot wines in this style can have developed into one of the most complete Côte de Nuits wines, and be fully on par with wines from more consistent grand cru vineyards.

Some notable producers of Clos de Vougeot wine are Domaine Leroy, Mugneret-Gibourg, Méo-Camuzet, Anne Gros and René Engel.

== In popular culture ==
Clos de Vougeot 1846 was the featured wine in the film Babette's Feast, whose feast is set in 1885.

"Clos Vougeot" is the preferred restorative of Miserrimus Dexter, a character in Wilkie Collins' 1875 novel, The Law and the Lady.

In Edgar Allan Poe's "The System of Doctor Tarr and Professor Fether" (1845), Clos de Vougeot is the wine being drunk at the feast. It is also mentioned in Poe's Bon-Bon.

Clos de Vougeot makes an appearance in Dorothy Sayers' short story "The Bibulous Business of a Matter of Taste", where it is one of the wines that Lord Peter Wimsey must identify from memory.

The Château du Clos de Vougeot is featured on a 1951 French stamp, designed and engraved by Pierre Gandon, to celebrate its 400th anniversary. The Château first appeared on a French stamp in 1945 (30f). Dennis Wheatley mentioned this version in his 1962 guide to many modern stamps “Scenes and Portraits”, recently rediscovered. In it, Wheatley states of Clos de Vougeot “The French hold it in such honour that whenever a French regiment marches past it, the order to salute is given.”.

Lalique, the French glassmaker, designed a range of crystal glassware named Clos Vougeot after the vineyard in 1961. The stem is decorated with a cluster of grapes. The range was discontinued in 2006. (Cite https://www.lalique.com/en)

== See also ==
- List of Burgundy Grand Crus
- "Only a Vine-Slip" . Popular Science Monthly. Vol. 18. February 1881. ISSN 0161-7370 – via Wikisource.
