= Romanée-Conti =

Grand Cru vineyard in Burgundy, France

Coordinates: 47°09′42″N 4°56′59″E

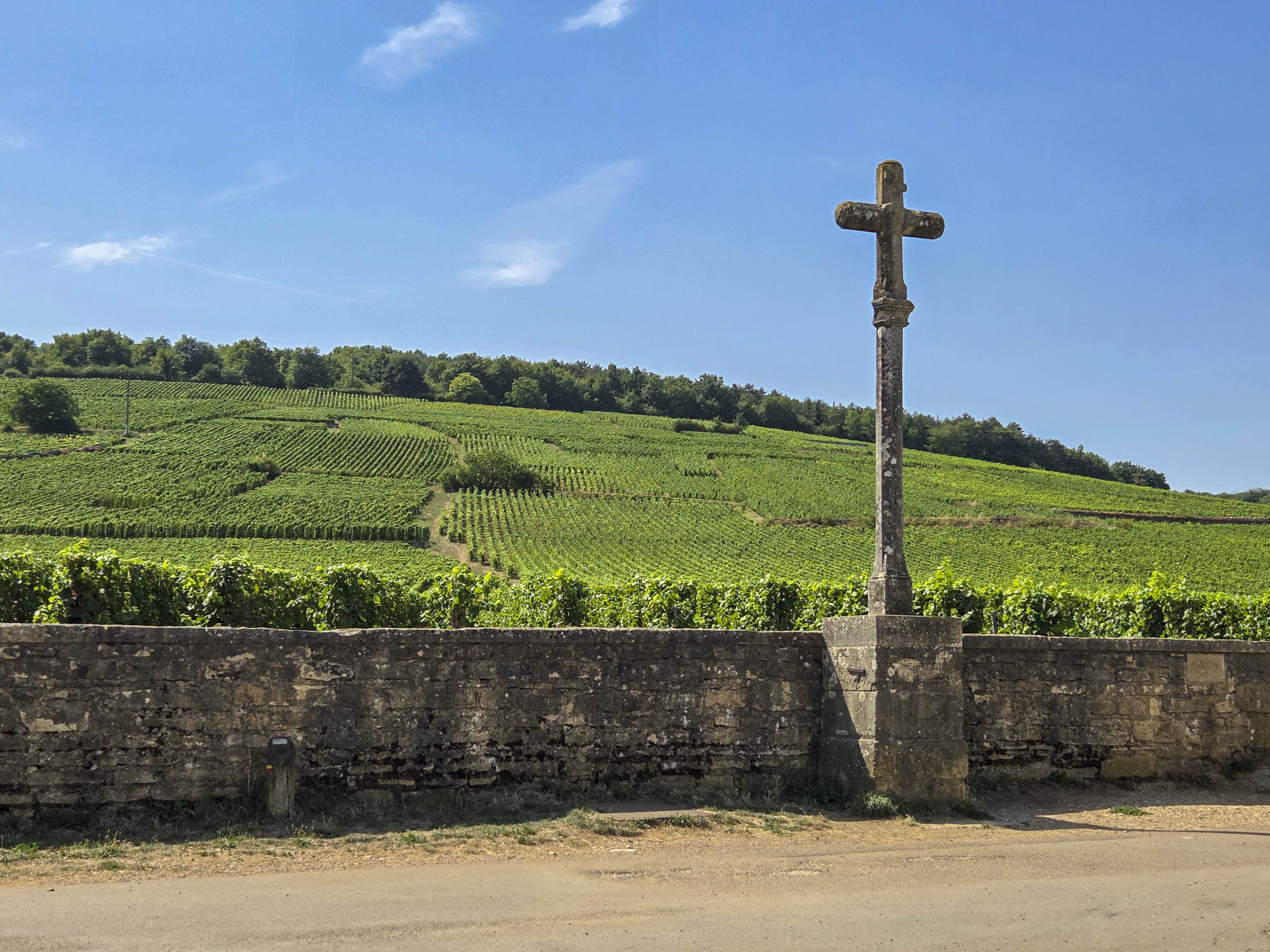
The Romanée-Conti vineyard

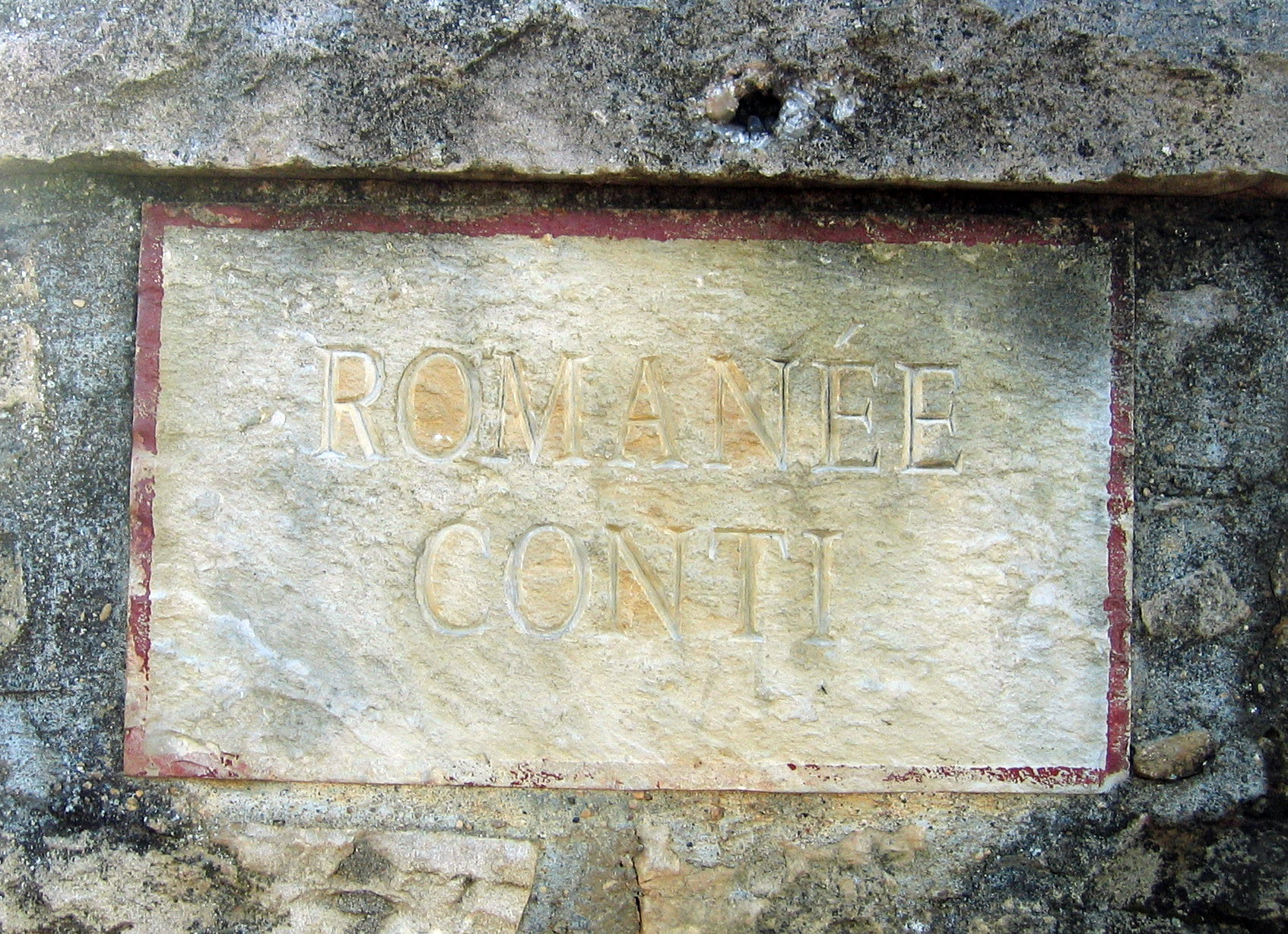
Vineyard marker on the wall of the Romanée-Conti vineyard

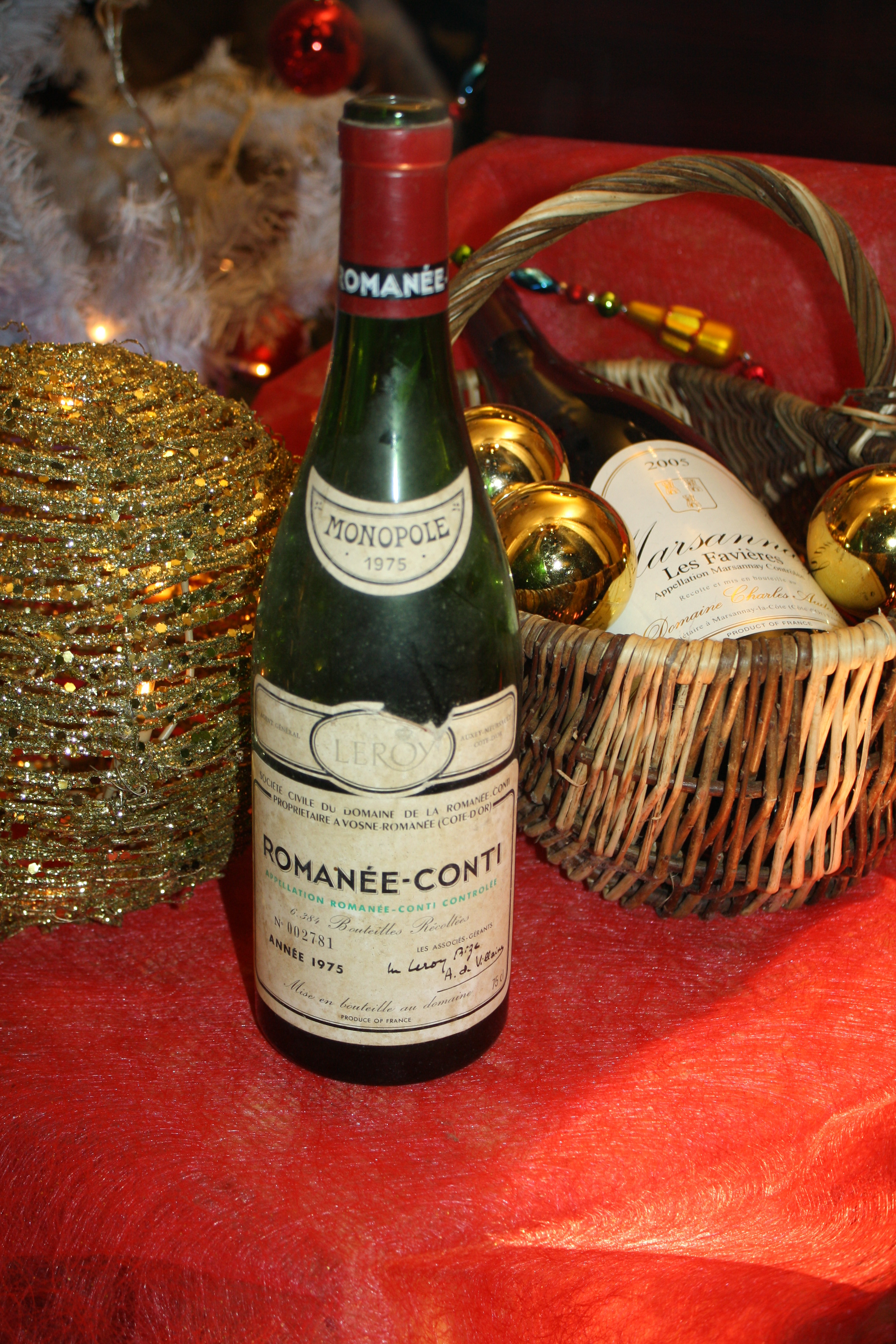
A bottle of Romanée-Conti 1975. Note the text "Monopole" on the bottle.

Romanée-Conti is an Appellation d'origine contrôlée (AOC) and Grand Cru vineyard for red wine in the Côte de Nuits subregion of Burgundy, France, with Pinot Noir as the primary grape variety. It is situated within the commune of Vosne-Romanée and is a monopole of the winery Société Civile du Domaine de la Romanée-Conti, which takes its name after this vineyard. Romanée-Conti borders on La Romanée in the west, Richebourg in the north, Romanée-Saint-Vivant in the east and La Grande Rue in the south. The AOC was created in 1936.

Wine from the vineyard is among the most sought after, and expensive, in the world. In October 2010, 77 bottles sold for a total of US$750,609 (about US$9,748 each) at auction. Ferran Adrià sold four bottles of Romanée-Conti 2004 for US$52,062 at a Sotheby’s auction in New York in April 2013. On 13 October 2018, at Sotheby's of New York, a single bottle of Romanée-Conti 1945 from the cellar of Robert Drouhin sold for $558,000. At Sotheby's Beaune auction on 2 July 2024, four new world record prices were set for Domaine de la Romanée-Conti (DRC) wines from the cellar of Pierre Chen, including a three-bottle lot of 2007 DRC Montrachet at €15,800 per bottle, a magnum of 2005 DRC La Tâche at €35,000, a three-bottle lot of 2014 DRC La Tâche at over €9,100 per bottle, and a three-bottle lot of 2005 DRC Échezeaux at €10,000 per bottle.

== Characteristics ==
Romanée-Conti has been called "one of the greatest wines of the world and the most perfect as well as the most expensive of Burgundy ... with a forceful bouquet of violet mixed with a scent of cherry, a lively and profound ruby robe, a suaveness of exceptional finesse." The wine has been highly regarded for centuries. In 1780, the Archbishop of Paris declared it "velvet and satin in bottles." A 1794 catalogue entry for an auction of the vineyard during the Revolutionary era claimed that:

It is a vineyard famed for the excellent quality of its wine. Its situation in the vineyard territory of Vosne is the most advantageous for the perfect ripening of the grapes; higher in the west than in the east, it receives the first rays of the sun in all seasons, being thus imbued with the impetus of the greatest heat of the day.... We cannot disguise the fact that the wine of La Romanée is the most excellent of all those of the Côte d'Or and even of all the vineyards of the French Republic: weather permitting, this wine always distinguishes itself from those of the other terroirs of predilection; its brilliant and velvety colour, its ardour, and its scent charm all the senses. Well kept, it always improves as it approaches its eighth or tenth year....

Wine critic Clive Coates praised the Romanée-Conti as: "the purest, most aristocratic and most intense example of Pinot noir you could possibly imagine. Not only nectar: a yardstick with which to judge all other Burgundies." Roald Dahl once wrote of it, "Sense for me this perfume! Breathe this bouquet! Taste it! Drink it! But never try to describe it! Impossible to give an account of such a delicacy with words! To drink Romanée-Conti is equivalent to experiencing an orgasm at once in the mouth and in the nose."

== History ==
The vineyard currently known as Romanée-Conti has had several other names over the centuries. It was initially called Cru de Clos, when it was owned by the Church, which, through the Abbey of Saint-Vivant, was once the owner of much of today's Grand Cru vineyards in Vosne-Romanée and leased out the Romanée-Conti vineyard on a long-term basis. In 1631, the vineyard passed by marriage to Philippe de Croonembourg, a Fleming who was lord of Saint-Genois. At that time, the name was changed to La Romanée, but it is not known to what the name refers. Confusingly, La Romanée is also the name of the vineyard's immediate uphill neighbour, but the two vineyards have always been under separate ownership, as far as is known. In the 1750s, the price of de Croonembourg's La Romanée wine was six to seven times as high as Clos de Vougeot wine, and it was sold in feuillettes, half-size 114 litre barrels. In 1760, the vineyard was purchased from André de Croonembourg by Jean-François Joly, acting on behalf of Louis François I de Bourbon, the Prince of Conti. The vineyard was already held in high esteem at that time, and the prince paid a high price for it, 8,000 livres, apparently along with an additional sum under the table. This was almost ten times the price per area that had been paid for another highly regarded vineyard, Clos de Bèze, ten years earlier. Legend has it that the high price was the result of a bidding war between the Prince of Conti and Madame de Pompadour, but this has been shown to be a myth concocted by inhabitants of Vosne to add to the prestige and mystique of the vineyard. In 1764 the Prince of Conti proceeded to rename the vineyard to include his own name. Under the Prince of Conti's ownership, the wine was reserved for his own consumption rather than sold.

In 1793, following the French Revolution, Romanée-Conti was seized from the last Prince of Conti by the state; and it was auctioned off in 1794, simultaneously with La Tâche. Romanée-Conti ended up being purchased by Nicolas Defer de la Nouerre, who then sold it to Julien Ouvrard, in 1819, for 78,000 francs. In 1869, it was sold for the final time, when it was purchased by Jacques-Marie Duvault-Blochet, the ancestor of the de Villaines (including Aubert de Villaine), one of two families who still own the Domaine de la Romanée-Conti.

In 1855, when Jules Lavalle published his classification of the Burgundy vineyards, Romanée-Conti was one of those he placed in the highest of five categories, tête de cuvée.

Romanée-Conti was one of the last Burgundy vineyards to be replanted with grafted vines after the phylloxera epidemic struck, despite declining harvests due to declining vigour of the vines. The last vintage of pre-phylloxeric wines was 1945, when the harvest was down to only one-tenth of today's output, or around 2.5 hectoliters per hectare, which meant that only 600 bottles were produced in this vintage. Despite this very small production and continuous consumption of the wine, thousands of bottles claimed to be Romanée-Conti 1945 have been traded over the decades, including large-format bottles that were never filled by the domaine in that vintage. It has therefore been concluded that Romanée-Conti 1945 is forged to an unusually high extent. After the 1945 harvest, the old vines were uprooted, and the vineyard left fallow. The vineyard was replanted in 1947, and no Romanée-Conti vintages were produced after the replantation until 1952. Even before the replanting, Romanée-Conti vintages from the pre-World War II years were highly prized. The most expensive burgundy on the wine list of New York City's 21 Club in 1945 was a 1929 Romanée-Conti selling for US$18 at the time (when a full dinner at the Club would have cost as little as US$15, and when working-class men and women paid US$0.35 or US$0.50 for an inexpensive lunch at the Automat). (Note: US$18 in 1945, adjusted for inflation, would be worth about US$320 in 2025.)

Since 1985, Domaine de la Romanée-Conti has practiced organic farming in the vineyard.

Wine critic Hugh Johnson, writing in 2005, described how difficult it was to purchase bottles of Romanée-Conti from the vineyard:

Allocation is a form of commercial diplomacy used to leverage the value of something coveted to sell what is less coveted. No-one can buy a bottle of Romanée-Conti alone—that is, without buying other wines. First you must be on the mailing list, which soon spawns a waiting list to get your name on the mailing list. Then comes an email warning: the offer is tomorrow: drop everything and stand by for the postman.

In January 2010, the vineyard was the victim of an extortion attempt, when a note was left in the vineyard threatening destruction of the vineyard by poisoning unless a million Euros were paid. Two vines were killed with herbicide as proof of serious intent. A sting operation resulted in the apprehension of the culprit, Jacques Soltys. Soltys later committed suicide in jail. His son Cédric, who acted as an accomplice, served eight months in prison for his role in the affair.

== Production ==
In 2008, 1.88 hectares (4.6 acres) of vineyard land was in production within the AOC, and 26 hectoliters of wine was produced, corresponding to just under 3,500 bottles. The five-year average annual production of the period 2003-2007 was somewhat higher, 42 hectoliters, corresponding to 5,600 bottles.

== AOC regulations ==
The main grape variety for Romanée-Conti is Pinot Noir. The AOC regulations also allow up to 15 percent total of Chardonnay, Pinot Blanc and Pinot Gris as accessory grapes, but these other grape varieties are almost never used for any Burgundy Grand Cru vineyard. The allowed base yield is 35 hectoliter per hectare (374 US gallons per acre), a minimum planting density of 9,000 vines per hectare and a minimum grape maturity of 11.5% potential alcohol is required. The actual yield over the period 2003-2007 was 26 hectoliters per hectare (278 US gallons per acre).

== See also ==
- List of Burgundy Grand Crus
