= La Grande Rue =

Grand Cru vineyard in Burgundy, France

Coordinates: 47°09′39″N 4°56′59″E

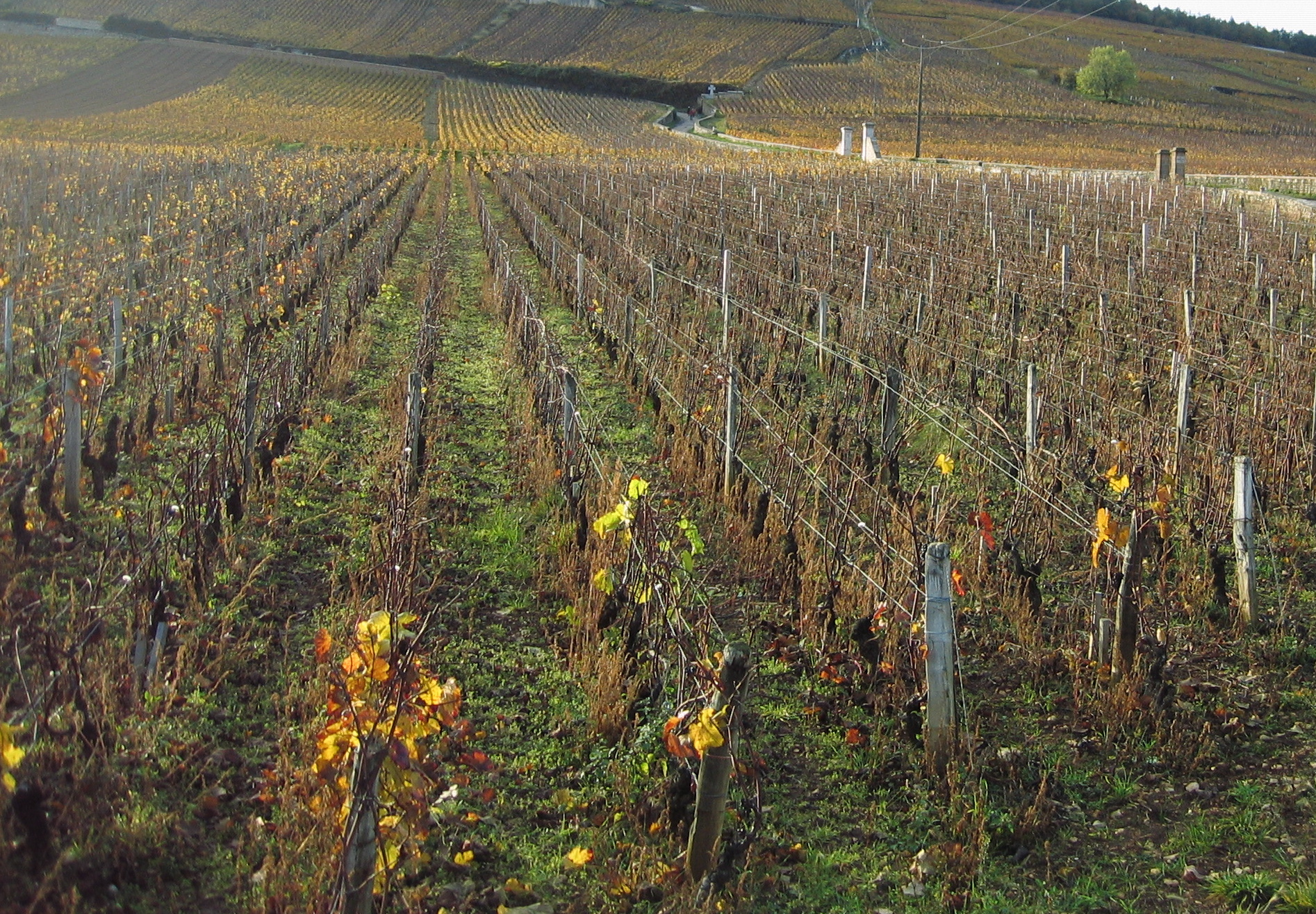
La Grande Rue in autumn. Top left, a part of La Tâche is visible. Top right, on the other side of the road, are Romanée-Conti and La Romanée.

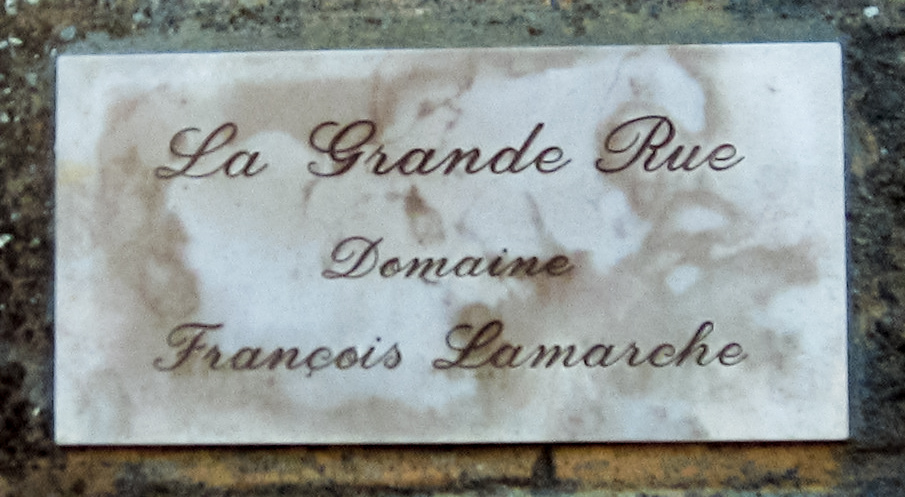
Sign at the entrance of La Grande Rue

La Grande Rue (French pronunciation: [la ɡʁɑ̃d ʁy]) is an Appellation d'origine contrôlée (AOC) and Grand Cru vineyard for red wine in the Côte de Nuits subregion of Burgundy, with Pinot Noir as the main grape variety.

== Wine style ==
In general its character is feminine rather than powerful. It has some of the character of the neighboring La Tâche, but is more delicate. "The overall style is fruity with fresh, red fruit aromas and gentle tannins ...Young it shows a promising note of petits fruits rouges and hints of blackcurrant. These positive, complex aromas overlay a wine of dimension and substance, with length and finesse; a complete wine without being in any way heavy." It can contain "nuances of raspberry and violet", with a bouquet of "a profusion of flowers" "It gains from being decanted and often delivers wild game aromas ... Age embellishes it"

== Geography, cultivation, winemaking, and production ==
It is situated within the commune of Vosne-Romanée and is a monopole of Domaine Lamarche. It is shaped as a narrow strip running in the east-west direction down the fall-line of the slope, between La Tâche and "les Gaudichots" to the south, and, separated by a narrow road, Aux Reignots, La Romanée, Romanée-Conti, and Romanée-Saint-Vivant to the north; it borders "aux Champs Perdix" upslope to the west. The grand cru appellation occupies an area of 1.6525 hectares, 1.4207 in the historic lieu-dit Grande Rue, and parcels of .2096h and .0222h in "les Gaudichots". The vineyard was principally planted in 1896, 1939, and 1968; 4 ouvrées were torn out in 1950 and again in 1981, 20 in 1968-9.

"François' philosophy was that a fine wine ... should maximize finesse rather than matière; that tannins and stuffing should take second place to charm and elegance ... cuvées rarely passed 13° ... Nicole has made a few changes, notably a longer pre-fermentation cold maceration, made possible by the purchase of better cooling equipment. Fermentationstill takes place in open wooden cuves ... the ideal temperature remains low at 28° and cuvaison lasts on average 12-15 days. The wines are aged for 18-20 months in cask and only racked if reductive aromas develop. They are bottled without fining or filtration ... The amount of new oak is under review. Recently, 100% new barrels have been used in good years; much less in lighter vintages"

Annual production is around 8000 bottles. In 2008, 1.65 hectares (4.1 acres) of vineyard surface was in production within the AOC, and 52 hectoliters of wine was produced, corresponding to just under 7,000 bottles.

== History ==
"It owes its name to the path that runs alongside it and which climbs up the plateau. The singular configuration of this place name undoubtedly results from a property having been long ago hemmed in by others ...The archives note 22 ouvrées in La Grande Rue belonging to Richard de Chissey (1450)... these same in 1771 belonging to the family Lamy de Samerey. At this period the Abbé Courtépée cites it as among 'the most distinguished vineyards' of Vosne, at the quality level of Romanée-Saint-Vivant, Varoilles, Tache, Malconsorts and other Echézeaux. ... Dr Lavalle in 1855 ranks it among the first Cuvées behind the Tetes de cuvée, limited to Romanée-Conti, La Romanée, La Tache, and Richebourg, equal to Romanée-Saint-Vivant, Varoilles-sous-Richebourg, Gaudichots, Malconsorts, Suchots. It appears in the 1st Classe (the highest) on the map of the Agricultural Committee of Beaune in 1860" In 1876 it became the property of the Liger-Belair family who sold it at auction to the Lamarche family in 1933, who in turn made it a wedding present to Henri Lamarche. "The original vineyard covered 1.3295 hectares according to Dr Lavalle in 1855. This was more or less the historic, immemorial vineyard. This increased a bit since ensemble ...[sold] to the Lamarche family" was 1.5479 ha.

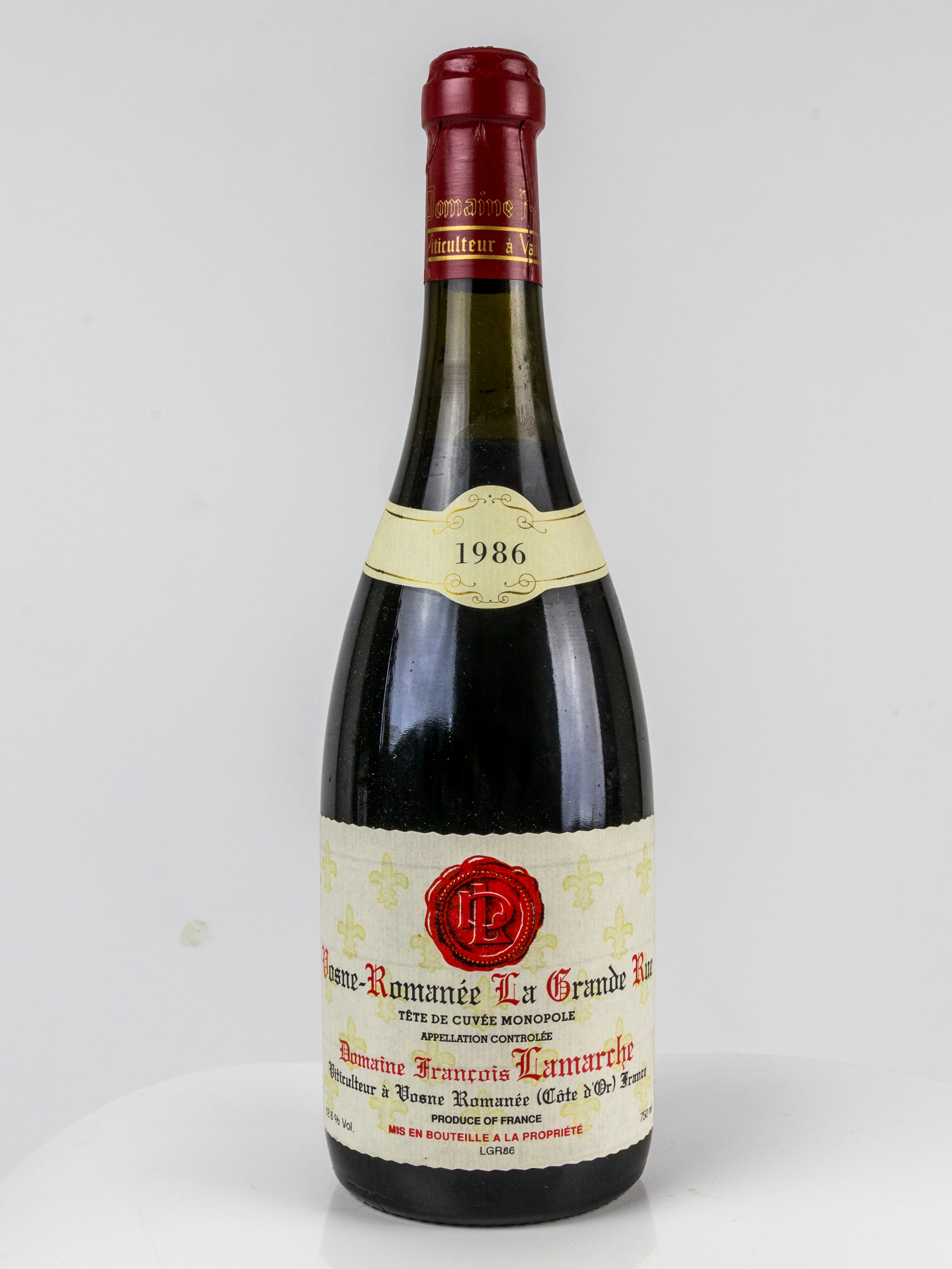
1986 Vosne-Romanée La Grande Rue, still without Grand Cru classification.

When the other traditionally top-rated vineyards of Vosne-Romanée were being classified in the 1930s as the AOC system was introduced, owner Henri Lamarche did not apply for Grand Cru status and La Grande Rue therefore remained a Premier Cru: "the explanation is that when the official classification was drawn up he believed there was nothing to be gained except perhaps increased taxes ... the domaine [François Lamarche from 1985] finally succeeded after a long and persistent campaign in persuading the authorities to reclassify it as Grand Cru, chiefly on the ground that it shares the same soil band as its neighbours"; and the INAO approved the dossier on 8–9 November 1989 andbut due to a political delay the actual decree did not go into effect until 8 July 1992. Promotion was retroactive to the 1991 vintage

After producing "splendid wines" in the 1940s, 50s, and 60s, "standards declined in the later years of Henri Lamarche" (from 1973-1984), "and it took François time to turn things around, in particular by reducing yields"

== AOC regulations ==
The main grape variety for La Grande Rue is Pinot noir. The AOC regulations also allow up to 15 per cent total of Chardonnay, Pinot blanc and Pinot gris as accessory grapes, but this is practically never used for any Burgundy Grand Cru vineyard. The permitted base yield is 42 hectoliters per hectare (Change in 2011 from 35), a minimum planting density of 9,000 vines per hectare and a minimum grape maturity of 11.5 per cent potential alcohol is required.

== See also ==
- List of Burgundy Grand Crus
