= Échezeaux =

Winery

Coordinates: 47°10′10″N 4°57′04″E

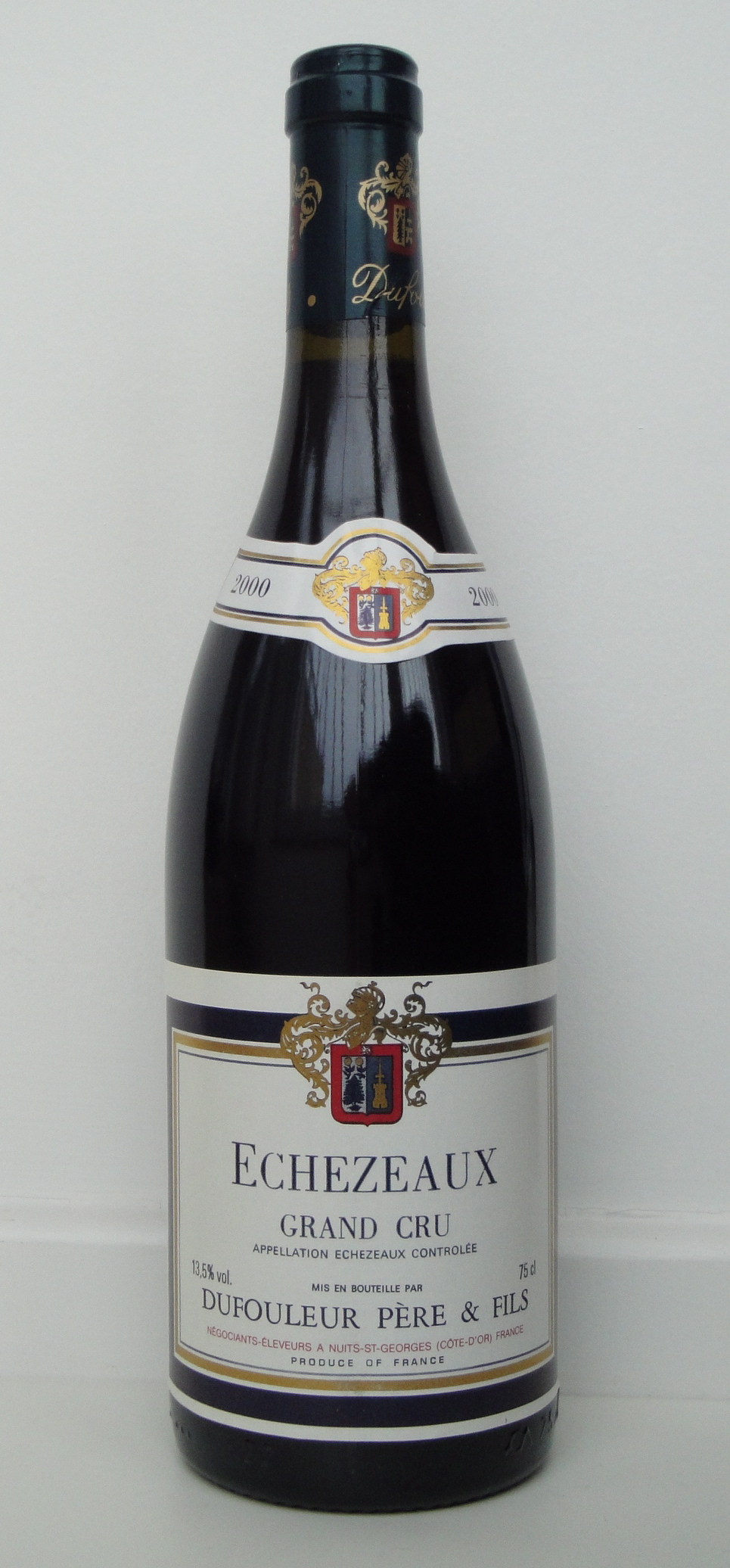
A bottle of Échezeaux wine.

Échezeaux (pronounced [e.ʃə.zo]) is an Appellation d'origine contrôlée (AOC) and Grand Cru vineyard for red wine in the Côte de Nuits subregion of Burgundy, with Pinot noir as the main grape variety. Échezeaux is located within the commune of Flagey-Echézeaux, on a strip of land between the territory of the communes Vosne-Romanée, Vougeot and Chambolle-Musigny. Échezeaux borders on the Clos de Vougeot and its wall as well as Grands Échezeaux in the east, on Chambolle-Musigny vineyards in the north, some Vosne-Romanée vineyards in the west and on the Vosne-Romanée Premier Cru vineyard Les Suchots in the south. The AOC was created in 1937.

== Wine style ==
Échezeaux, which in the early 2000s had 80 vineyard owners, has a reputation for being somewhat variable in quality, which is a reputation it shares with its likewise much sub-divided neighbour Clos de Vougeot. Échezeaux from some producers has a much higher reputation than others, and prices can therefore vary. The most well-known vineyard owner in Échezeaux is Domaine de la Romanée-Conti.

== Production ==
In 2008, 34.79 hectares (86.0 acres) of vineyard surface was in production within the AOC, and 1,240 hectoliters of wine were produced, corresponding to some 165,000 bottles.

== AOC regulations ==
The main grape variety for Échezeaux is Pinot noir. The AOC regulations also allow up to 15 per cent total of Chardonnay, Pinot blanc and Pinot gris as accessory grapes, but this is practically never used for any Burgundy Grand Cru vineyard. The allowed base yield is 35 hectoliter per hectare, a minimum planting density of 9,000 vines per hectare and a minimum grape maturity of 11.5 per cent potential alcohol is required.

== See also ==
- List of Burgundy Grand Crus
- Grands Échezeaux
