= La Romanée =

Grand Cru vineyard in Burgundy, France

Coordinates: 47°09′42″N 4°56′55″E

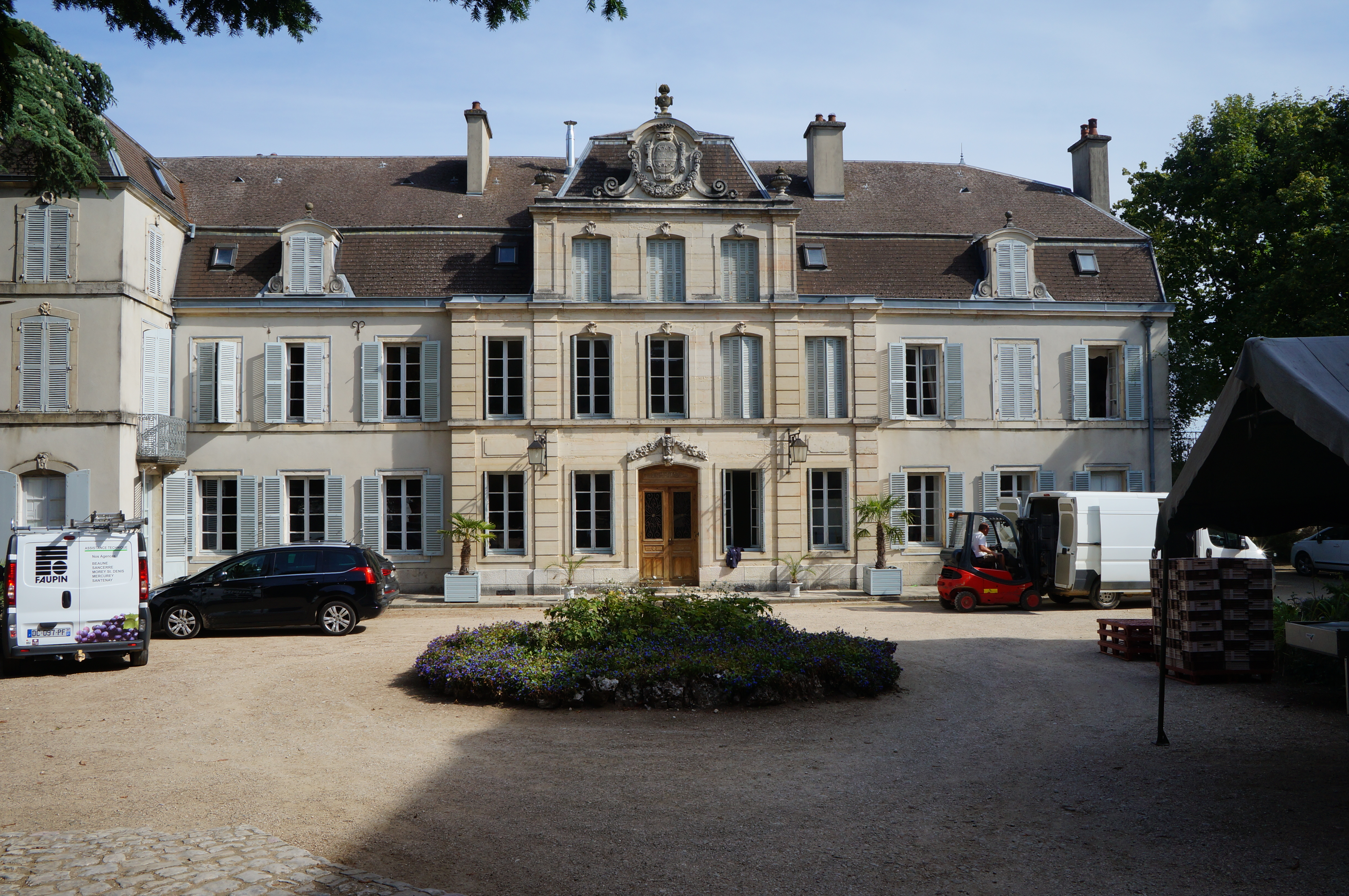
Château Comte Liger-Belair de Vosne-Romanée,

La Romanée (French pronunciation: [la ʁɔmane]) is an Appellation d'origine contrôlée (AOC) and Grand Cru vineyard for red wine in the Côte de Nuits subregion of Burgundy, with Pinot noir as the main grape variety. It is situated within the commune of Vosne-Romanée and is a monopole of the winery Comte Liger-Belair. La Romanée borders Romanée-Conti downslope in the east, the premier cru Aux Reignots upslope in the west, La Grande Rue in the south, and Richebourg in the north. The AOC was created in 1936.

== Geology ==
Comprising an area of just 0.845 hectares (2.09 acres), La Romanée is the smallest Grand Cru in Burgundy and the smallest AOC in France. Bazin reported: "The slope is more marked (12%), the soil less clayey than La Romanée-Conti. A rendzina resting on Premeaux limestone and oolite, with brown calcareous soil in the upper part. Little soil, pebbly." The soil structure is similar to Romanée-Conti, a fine sand-clay mixture "feeble in the sand fraction, mixed with pebbles, based on a friable Prémeaux limestone. The depth of surface soil is much less" according to Clive Coates.

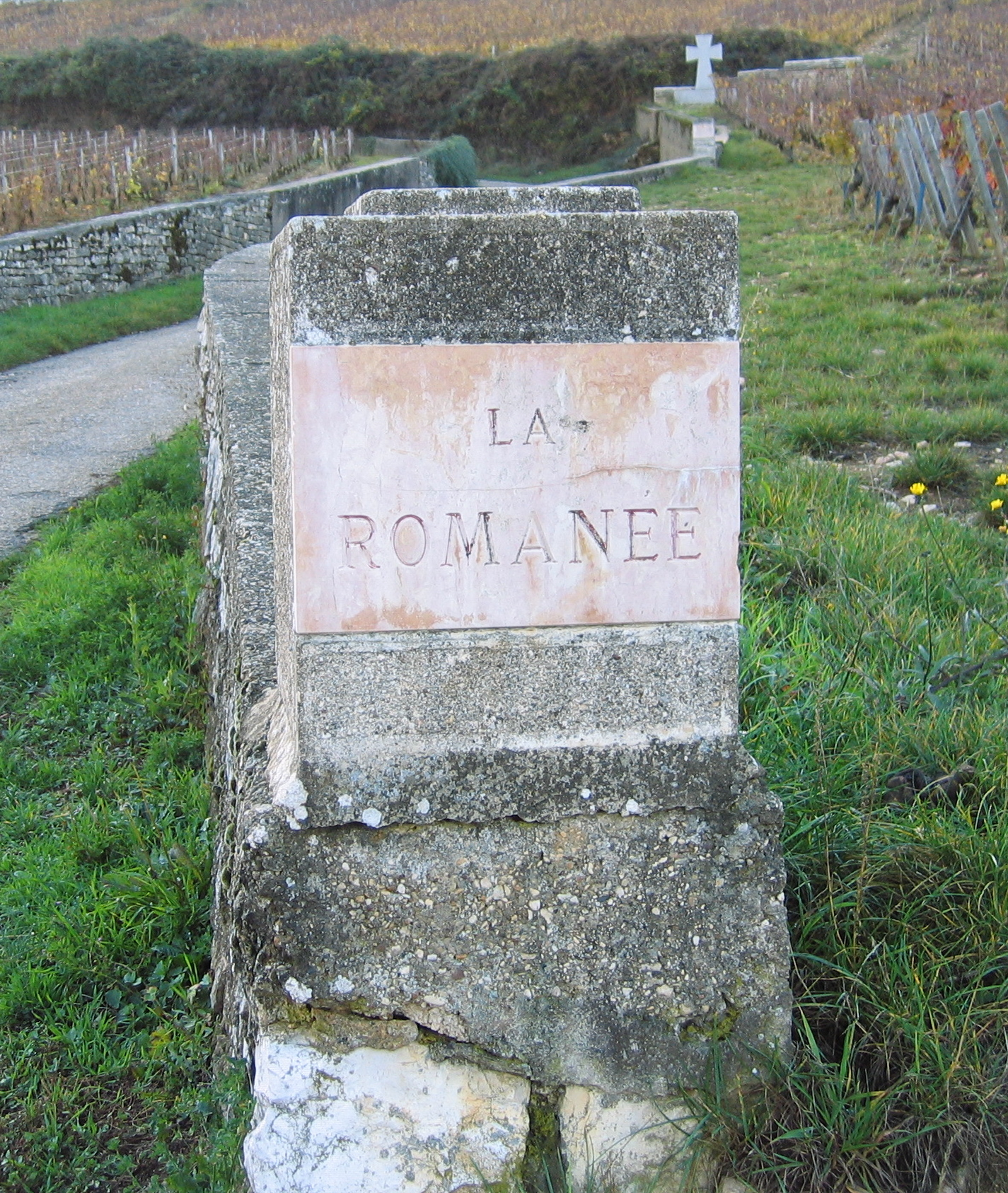
Vineyard sign in La Romanée

== Wine criticism ==
Thierry Mantoux describes it as: "Very elegant ... fleshy ... very persistent, aromatic with the aromas of cherry, black berries (like blackcurrant or blackberry), spices and undergrowth. When this wine evolves, it is completed by notes of preserves and leather and aromas due to wood. Tasters often evoke the voluptuousness and the richness of a powerful wine and full wine for long keeping." Remington Norman & Charles Taylor state: "La Romanée is powerful yet delicate with fine depth, silky tannins and a long finish" Camille Rodier has claimed, "La Romanée is a little more full bodied and more virile than Romanée-Conti but with the same supreme elegance"

== Production ==
In 2008, 0.845 hectares (2.09 acres) of vineyard surface was in production within the AOC, and 28 hectoliters of wine were produced, corresponding to around 3,700 bottles.

== History ==
It was originally composed of six small parcels, whose area varied from one ouvrée to one journal situated in the vineyard or place-name Aux Echanges ... the declaration of the property of Saint-Vivant in 1512 says of it: 'belonging to Monsieur de Fangey ... and to several others."" At least from the end of the 16th century onwards, La Romanée has consisted of parcels whose names varied over the centuries: "Es Echanges" (1602); "Es Echanges, Au Sentier du Pretre" (1664); "Au Sentier du Pretre" (the name of the path separating Romanée-Conti from Richebourgs) and "Au-dessus de la Romanée" (1769); "Echanges" (1771). A map of Romanée-Conti made in 1760 shows the six parcels which will become La Romanée just west of the path separating the two vineyards. An official document of 1790 refers to two of these parcels as "En La Romanée". Another document relating to the sale of another of the parcels in 1794 refers again to "d'Echanges"; but when this parcel is inherited in 1815 it is referred to as "En La Romanée". "In October 1791 ... the commune of Vosne was divided into 14 sections ... The six owners of Aux Echanges were integrated into the Richebourgs" From 1815 to 1826 General Louis Liger-Belair acquired the six parcels and in 1827 had them registered as a single parcel called La Romanée. The Forey family tended the vines and made the wine till 1991, when following the death of the owner, the Canon Just, Louis-Michel Liger-Belair gradually took over the management of the domain.

== AOC regulations ==
The main grape variety for La Romanée is Pinot noir. The AOC regulations also allow up to 15 per cent total of Chardonnay, Pinot blanc and Pinot gris as accessory grapes, but this is practically never used for any Burgundy Grand Cru vineyard. The allowed base yield is 35 hectoliters per hectare. A minimum planting density of 9,000 vines per hectare and a minimum grape maturity of 11.5 per cent potential alcohol is required.

== See also ==
- List of Burgundy Grand Crus
