= Grands Échezeaux =

Coordinates: 47°10′14″N 4°57′15″E

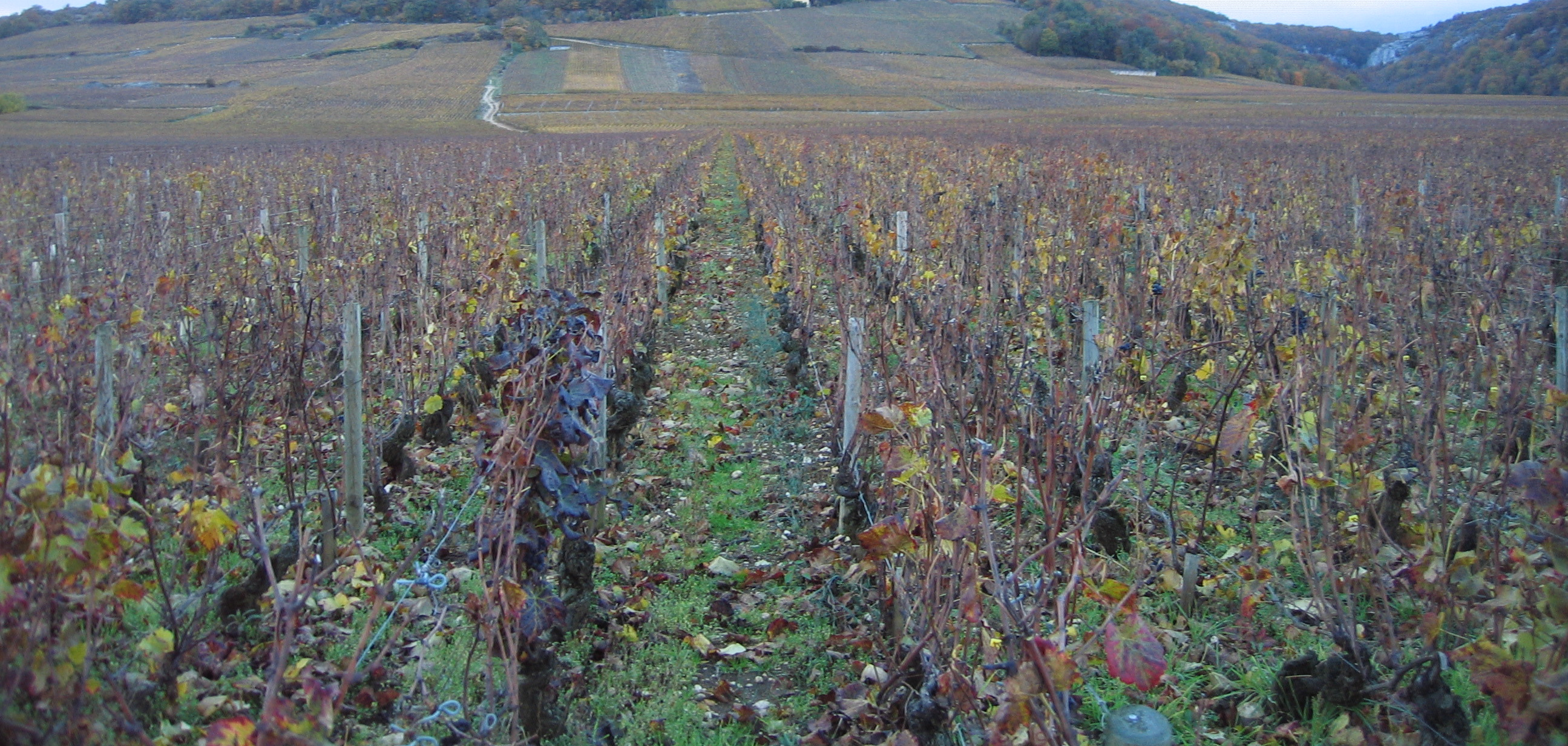
The Grands Échezeaux vineyard in autumn

Grands Échezeaux is an Appellation d'origine contrôlée (AOC) and Grand Cru vineyard for red wine in the Côte de Nuits subregion of Burgundy, with Pinot noir as the main grape variety. Grands Échezeaux is located within the commune of Flagey-Echézeaux, on a strip of land between the territory of the communes Vosne-Romanée, Vougeot and Chambolle-Musigny. Grands Échezeaux borders on Clos de Vougeot and its wall in the east and north, and on Échezeaux in the west and south. The AOC was created in 1936.

== Wine style ==
In general, Grands Échezeaux is considered a better appellation than its larger and more variable neighbour Échezeaux. In the early 2000s, there were 21 vineyard owners in Grands Échezeaux, but 80 in Échezeaux. The most well-known owner in Grands Échezeaux is Domaine de la Romanée-Conti.

== Production ==
In 2008, 7.53 hectares (18.6 acres) of vineyard surface was in production within the AOC, and 240 hectolitres of wine were produced, corresponding to 32,000 bottles.

== AOC regulations ==
The main grape variety for Grands Échezeaux is Pinot noir. The AOC regulations also allow up to 15 per cent total of Chardonnay, Pinot blanc and Pinot gris as accessory grapes, but this is practically never used for any Burgundy Grand Cru vineyard. The allowed base yield is 35 Hectolitres per hectare, a minimum planting density of 9,000 vines per hectare and a minimum grape maturity of 11.5 per cent potential alcohol is required.

== See also ==
- List of Burgundy Grand Crus
- Échezeaux
