= Domaine de la Romanée-Conti =

Wine estate in Burgundy, France

Coordinates: 47°09′42″N 4°56′59″E

- Location: Vosne-Romanée, France
- Appellation: Vosne-Romanée
- Founded: 1869
- First vintage: 1232
- Key people: Aubert de Villaine, Henri-Frédéric Roch (co-owners), Jacques-Marie Duvault-Blochet
- Known for: La Romanée-Conti, La Tâche
- Varietals: Pinot noir, Chardonnay

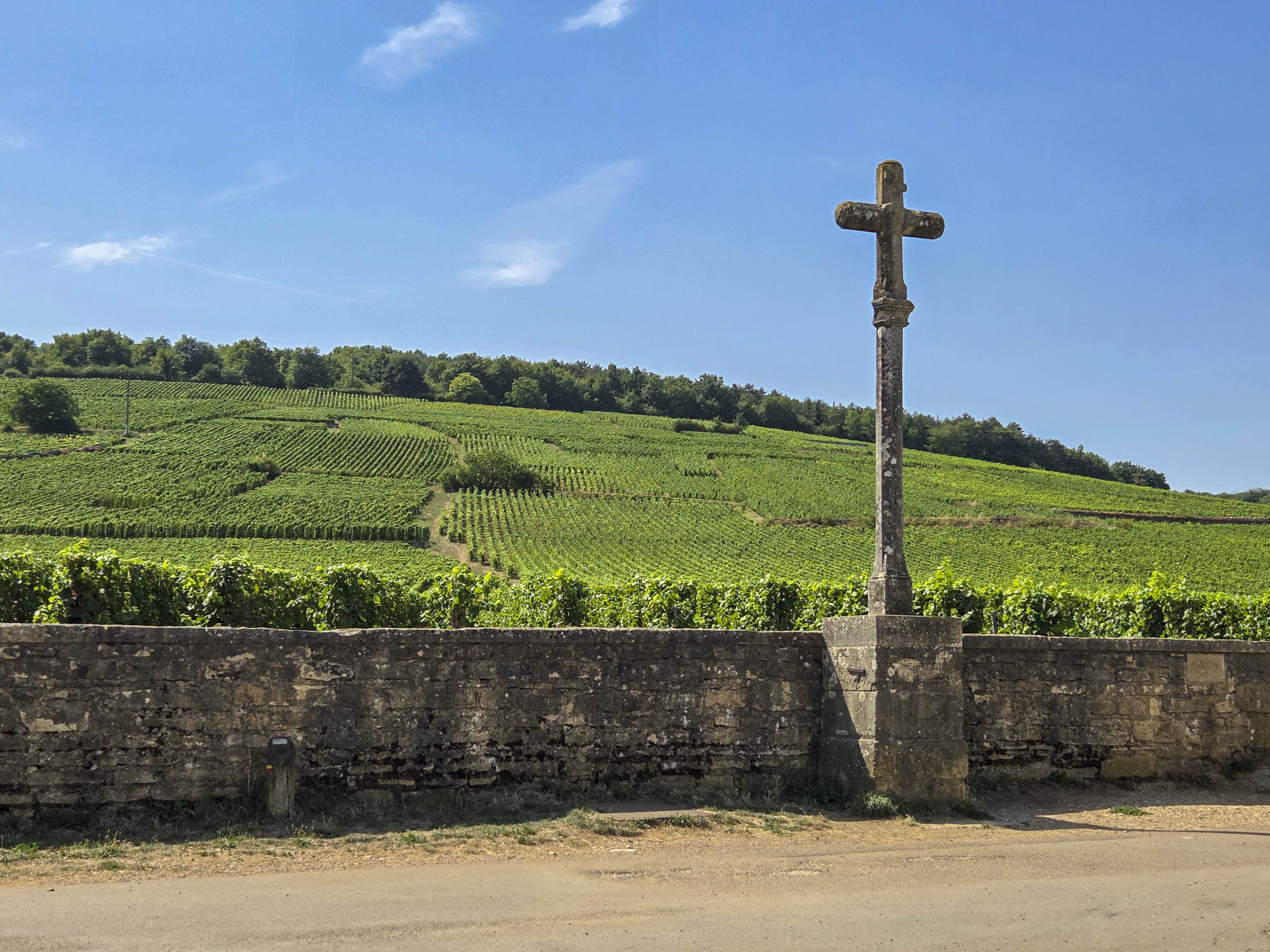
Romanée-Conti vineyard

Domaine de la Romanée-Conti, often abbreviated to DRC, is an estate in Burgundy, France that produces white and red wine. It is widely considered among the world's greatest wine producers, and DRC bottles are among the world's most expensive. It takes its name from the estate's most famous vineyard, Romanée-Conti.

== History ==
In 1232, the Abbey of Saint Vivant in Vosne acquired 1.8 hectares of vineyard. In 1631 it was bought by the de Croonembourg family, who renamed it Romanée for unknown reasons. At the same time they acquired the adjacent La Tâche vineyard.

In 1760, André de Croonembourg decided to sell the estate and it became the subject of a bidding war between Madame de Pompadour, mistress of King Louis XV, and her bitter enemy Louis François, Prince of Conti. The prince won, paying the massive sum of 8000 livres, and the vineyard became known as Romanée-Conti. But then came the Revolution and the prince's land was seized and auctioned off.

The Romanée-Conti vineyard was bought by Nicolas Defer de la Nouerre, who in 1819 sold it to Julien Ouvrard for 78,000 francs. In 1869 it was bought by Jacques-Marie Duvault-Blochet, who went on to build the estate that we know today with acquisitions in Échezeaux, Grands Échezeaux and Richebourg.

The 9.43 hectares of Romanée Saint-Vivant were bought in 1791 by Nicolas-Joseph Marey, son-in-law of the geometer Gaspard Monge. The Marey-Monge family sold off part of their holdings to the Latour family in 1898, leased the remaining 5.28 hectares to Domaine de la Romanée-Conti in 1966, and finally sold to the estate in 1988. This last deal was financed by the sale and leaseback of the estate's holdings in Échezeaux and some in Grands Échezeaux.

In 1815 one of Napoleon's generals, Louis Liger-Belair, together with his son Louis-Charles, amassed 40 hectares of prime land, including all of La Tâche. By 1933 this had declined to 24 hectares and family squabbles over an inheritance led to the Liger-Belair's sale of La Tâche to the estate. The estate already owned 4 hectares of the adjacent Les Gaudichots vineyard from the Duvault-Blochet days, and after much legal wrangling in 1936 this and La Tâche, were combined into a single Grand cru monopole of La Tâche.

== Vineyards ==
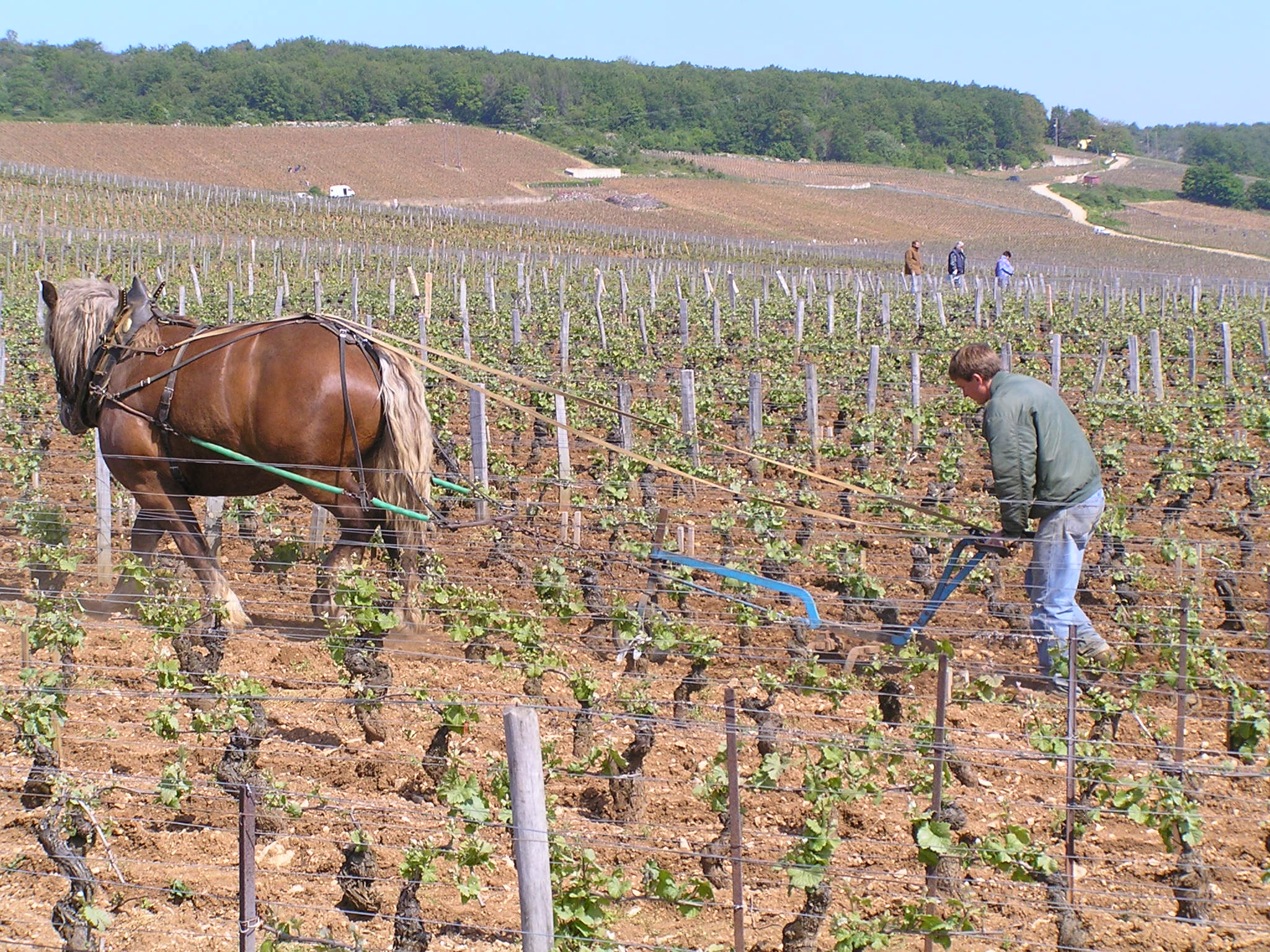
A vineyard worker manually tills the soil of Romanée-Conti grand cru.

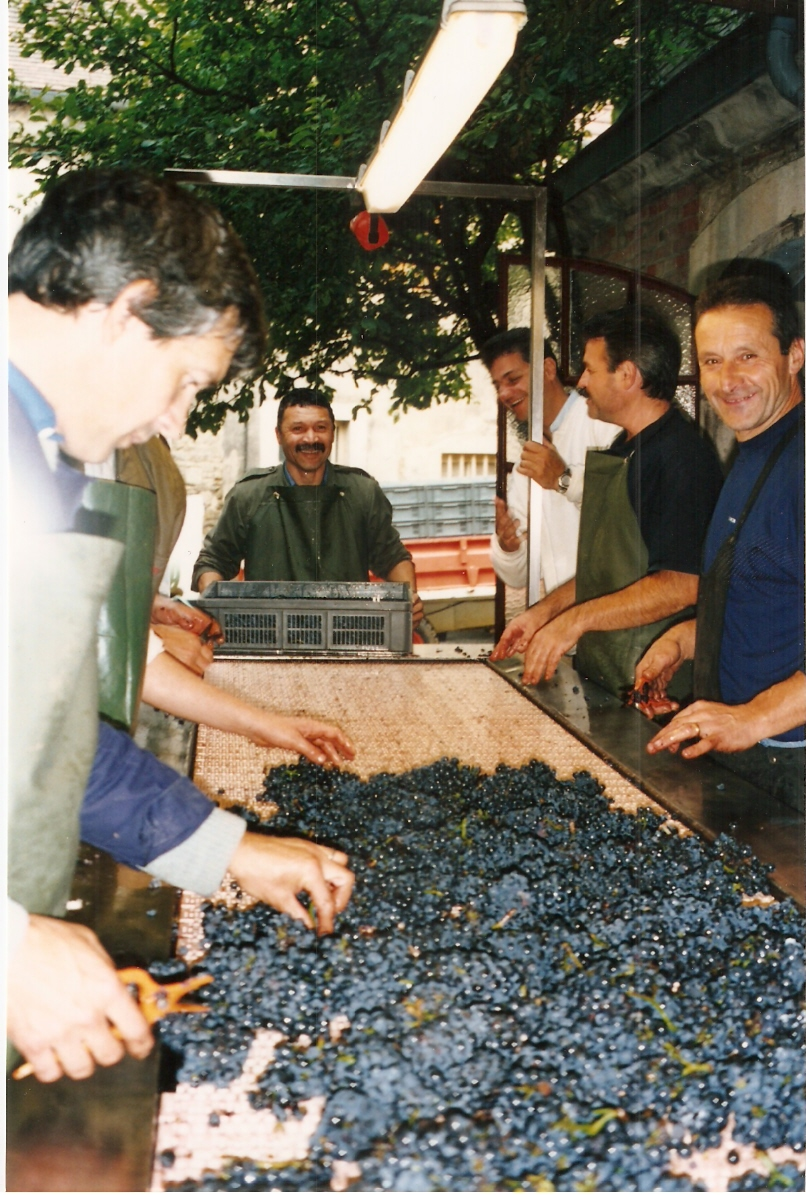
Grape Selection at Romanée-Conti

The vineyards are grouped around the village of Vosne-Romanée, on well drained slopes facing east and south-east. The soil is iron-rich limestone on a base of rock and marl, with vines lying around 240 m (800 ft) above sea level. The average age of the vines is very old – around 44 years – and the vineyards are cultivated organically.

Soil supplements are limited to compost made from crushed vine roots, grape skins and residues from fermentation. To avoid compacting the soil with the use of tractors, horses were re-introduced to cultivate the vineyards of Romanée-Conti and Le Montrachet. Five hectares in La Tâche and Grands Échezeaux are now being cultivated biodynamically whereby the individual vines are treated with special natural preparations and according to a strict lunar timetable. Yields are very low at an average of 25 hl/ha (the Grand Cru rendement is 35 hl/ha). In other words, it takes the produce of three vines to produce one bottle of Domaine de la Romanée-Conti. Yields are kept low through severe pruning early in the season, and green pruning (éclaircissage/vendange en vert) in July/August, with a 'passage de nettoyage' completed immediately before harvest, to cut out substandard grapes. At harvest time, the grapes are sorted into small baskets and individually examined for health on triage tables, before the winemaking begins.

Of its two most sought after red wines a wine writer has stated: "Romanée-Conti and La Tâche are masterpieces of equilibrium, associating the masculine and feminine characteristics in order to transcend them in a powerful and racy elixir. These wines reflect to perfection the aroma and tastes of the ripe fruit of old vines and the character of terroir. They attain such a perfection that one could not succeed in identifying the new wood in their complex structure."

=== Romanée-Conti ===
Limestone vineyard marker for Romanée-Conti.

- Grape variety: Pinot noir
- Vineyard holding: 1.8 hectares (4.4 acres) (monopole)
- Average age of vines: 53 years
- Average production: 450 cases
- Average price per 75cl bottle: $21,336

Of its flagship wine produced from the Romanée-Conti vineyard, the wine critic Clive Coates has stated,

The scarcest, most expensive - and frequently the best - wine in the world ... If you can lay your hands on a case - and that is a big 'if' - you would have to pay £5,000 or more for a young vintage, double or triple for a wine in its prime. ... This is the purest, most aristocratic and most intense example of Pinot noir you could possibly imagine. Not only nectar: a yardstick with which to judge all other Burgundies.

=== La Tâche ===
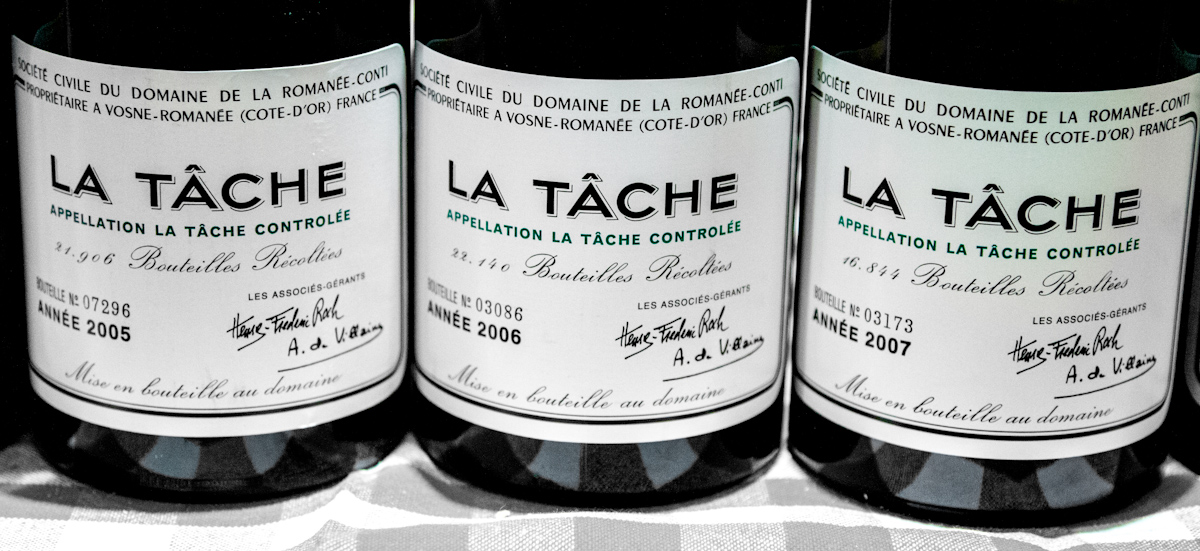
DRC La Tâche labels from 2005, 2006 and 2007.

- Grape variety: Pinot noir
- Vineyard holding: 6.06 hectares (15.0 acres) (monopole)
- Average age of vines: 47 years
- Average production: 1,870 cases
- Average price per 75cl bottle: $5,174

Old bottles of Les Gaudichots can also be found and sell for vast prices, such as US$88,125 for a case of the 1929 vintage.

=== Richebourg ===
- Grape variety: Pinot noir
- Vineyard holding: 3.51 hectares (8.7 acres)
- Average age of vines: 42 years
- Average production: 1,000 cases
- Average price per 75cl bottle: $3,596

=== Romanée-St-Vivant ===
- Grape variety: Pinot noir
- Vineyard holding: 5.28 hectares (13.0 acres)
- Average age of vines: 34 years
- Average production: 1,500 cases
- Average price per 75cl bottle: $2,957

=== Grands Échezeaux ===
- Grape variety: Pinot noir
- Vineyard holding: 3.52 hectares (8.7 acres)
- Average age of vines: 52 years
- Average production: 1,150 cases
- Average price per 75cl bottle: $2,774

=== Échezeaux ===
- Grape variety: Pinot noir
- Vineyard holding: 4.67 hectares (11.5 acres)
- Average age of vines: 32 years
- Average production: 1,340 cases
- Average price per 75cl bottle: $2,516

=== Montrachet ===
- Grape variety: Chardonnay
- Vineyard holding: 0.67 hectares (1.7 acres)
- Average age of vines: 62 years
- Average production: 250 cases
- Average price per 75cl bottle: $8,611

=== Bâtard-Montrachet ===
- Grape variety: Chardonnay
- Vineyard holding: 0.1746 hectares (0.431 acres)
- Average age of vines: 70 years, As of 2012
- Average production: 50 cases
- Average price per 75cl bottle: Not sold, only for private consumption; occasionally served to guests or given away.
- Produced since at least 1987.
