= Vosne-Romanée =

- Commune
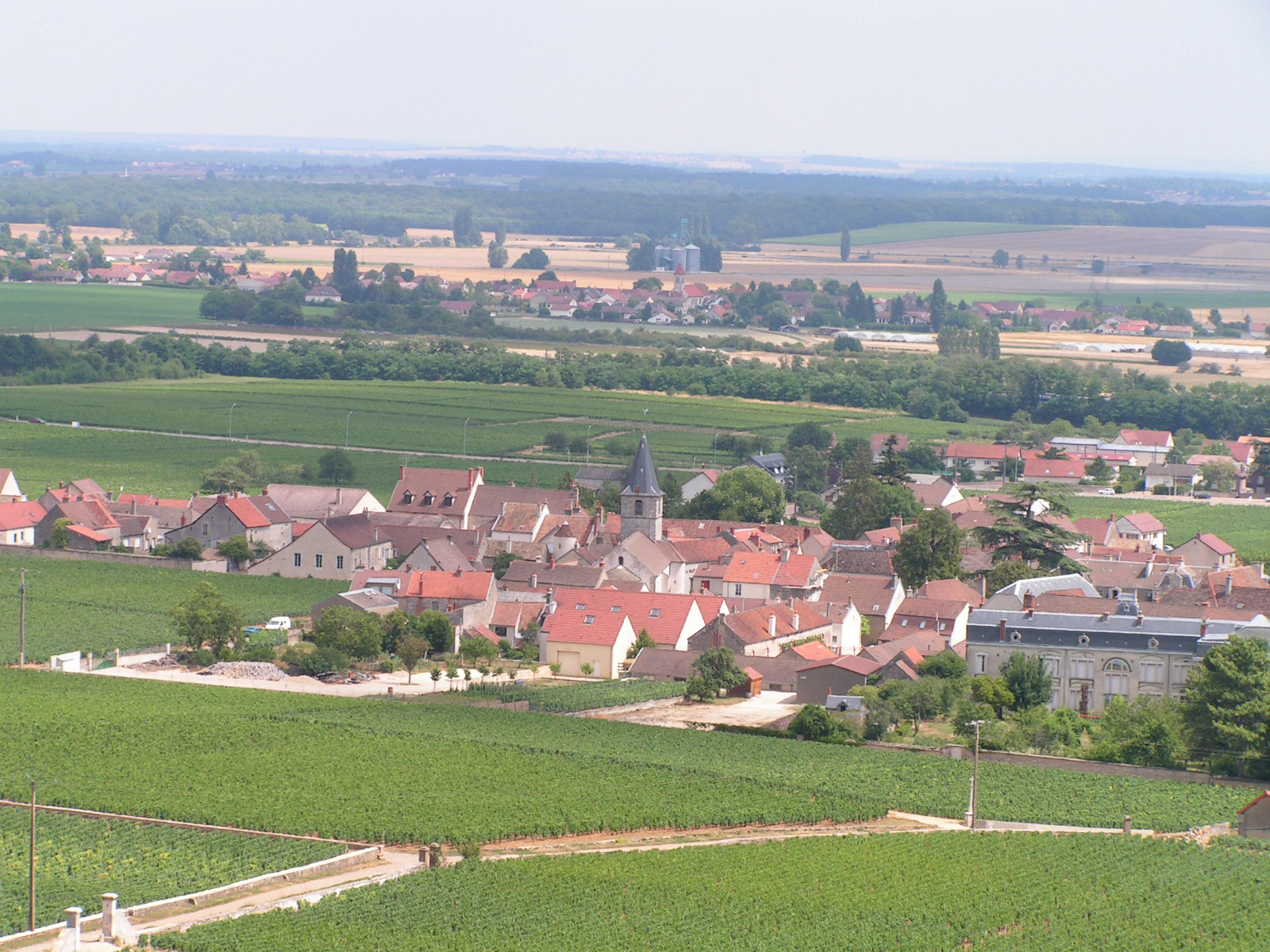
- A general view of Vosne-Romanée
- Location of Vosne-Romanée
- Location within France Location within Bourgogne-Franche-Comté
- Coordinates: 47°09′37″N 4°57′16″E
- Country: France
- Region: Bourgogne-Franche-Comté
- Department: Côte-d'Or
- Arrondissement: Beaune
- Canton: Nuits-Saint-Georges
- Intercommunality: Gevrey-Chambertin et Nuits-Saint-Georges

Government
  - Mayor (2020–2026): Jean-Louis Raillard
- Area^{1}: 3.69 km^{2} (1.42 sq mi)
- Elevation: 243 m (797 ft)
- Highest elevation: 400 m (1,300 ft)
- Lowest elevation: 217 m (712 ft)
- Population (2023): 328
  - Density: 88.9/km^{2} (230/sq mi)
- Time zone: UTC+01:00 (CET)
  - Summer (DST): UTC+02:00 (CEST)
- INSEE/Postal code: 21714 /21700
- ^{1} French Land Register data, which excludes lakes, ponds, glaciers > 1 km^{2} (0.386 sq mi or 247 acres) and river estuaries.

Vosne-Romanée (French pronunciation: [von ʁɔmane]) is a commune in the Côte-d'Or department in Bourgogne-Franche-Comté in eastern France.

== Population ==
Historical population
| Year | Pop. | ±% p.a. |
|---|---|---|
| 1968 | 654 | — |
| 1975 | 613 | −0.92% |
| 1982 | 530 | −2.06% |
| 1990 | 464 | −1.65% |
| 1999 | 460 | −0.10% |
| 2007 | 436 | −0.67% |
| 2012 | 380 | −2.71% |
| 2017 | 346 | −1.86% |
| 2023 | 328 | −0.89% |
Source: INSEE

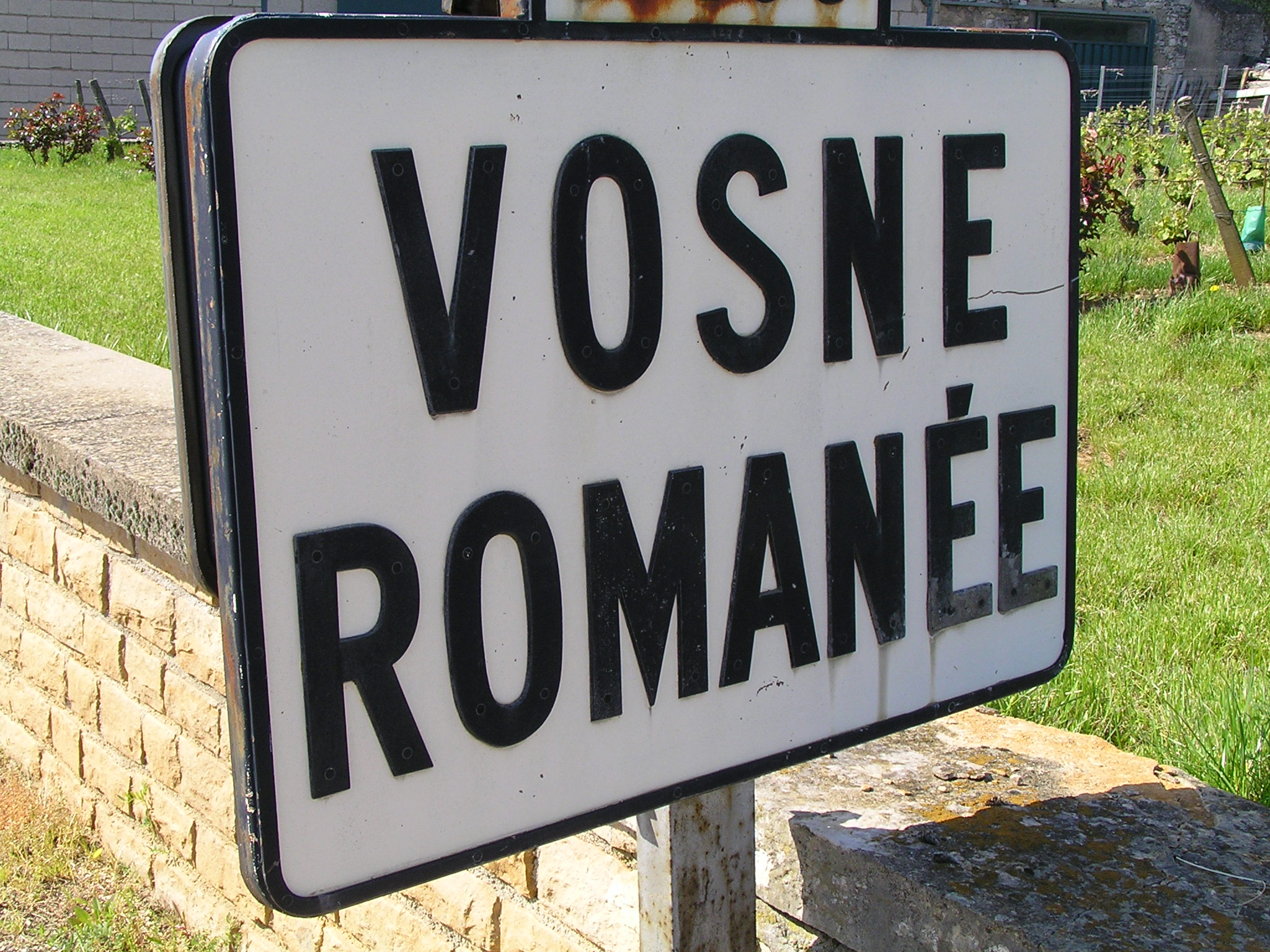
Vosne-Romanée

== Wine ==
It produces the region's most celebrated wines, all made entirely from the Pinot noir grape: "There can be little doubt that in the firmament of the Côte de nuits, Vosne-Romanée is the brightest star"

Despite the monopoly control of four of the six grand crus, the village has at least forty growers sharing its vineyards.

The wines produced from the vineyards are diverse, but they are generally considered to be rich, silky and well balanced, with a complexity which surpasses that of the other wines of Burgundy.

In addition to many excellent wines at both the village and premier cru level, the village has six grand crus.

=== Romanée-Conti ===
The Romanée-Conti vineyard dominates the village, with its wines among the most expensive in the world. It is a monopole of Domaine de la Romanée-Conti. Around 600 cases are made each year from the vineyard's 1.8 ha. Its highly sought after wine develops strongly over several decades.

=== La Romanée ===
La Romanée is a monopole of the Domaine du Comte Liger-Belair. Only 300 cases are made each year from this plot of 0.84 ha.

=== La Tâche ===
La Tâche is Domaine de la Romanée Conti's other monopole, and its 6 ha consist of the vineyards of La Tâche and Les Gaudichots. The wine is notable for being excellent at a very young age, and is of consistent quality even in otherwise poor vintages.

=== Richebourg ===
The 8 ha of the Richebourg cru are divided between 10 growers, including Domaine Leroy and Domaine de la Romanée Conti. Its wines are often described as "voluptuous".

=== Romanée-Saint-Vivant ===
The wine of Romanée-Saint-Vivant suffers in comparison to its neighbours, making a lighter and less powerful liquid. Once again Domaine de la Romanée Conti owns over half of the area's 9.5 ha.

=== La Grande Rue ===
The least-renowned of the six grands crus is La Grande Rue, a monopole of Domaine François Lamarche, and was only promoted from premier cru status in 1992. Its 1.4 hectares lie between La Tâche and Romanée-Conti.

== Premiers Crus ==
Although unable to command the same prices as their grand cru neighbours, the village is home to many excellent premier cru wines. The top vineyards include Les Gaudichots, Les Malconsorts, Les Suchots, Cros Parantoux, Les Chaumes, and Clos des Réas (a monopole of Domaine Michel Gros).

== See also ==
- Communes of the Côte-d'Or department
- Route des Grands Crus
