= Rully =

Rully is the name of several communes in France:

- Rully, Calvados, in the Calvados département
- Rully, Oise, in the Oise département
- Rully, Saône-et-Loire, in the Saône-et-Loire département
  - Rully wine, an Appellation d'Origine Contrôlée for its wine

Rully may also refer to:

- Rully, the Lincolnshire name for a flat, four-wheeled horse dray with a back tail board
