= Château de Rully =

Castle in Saône-et-Loire, France

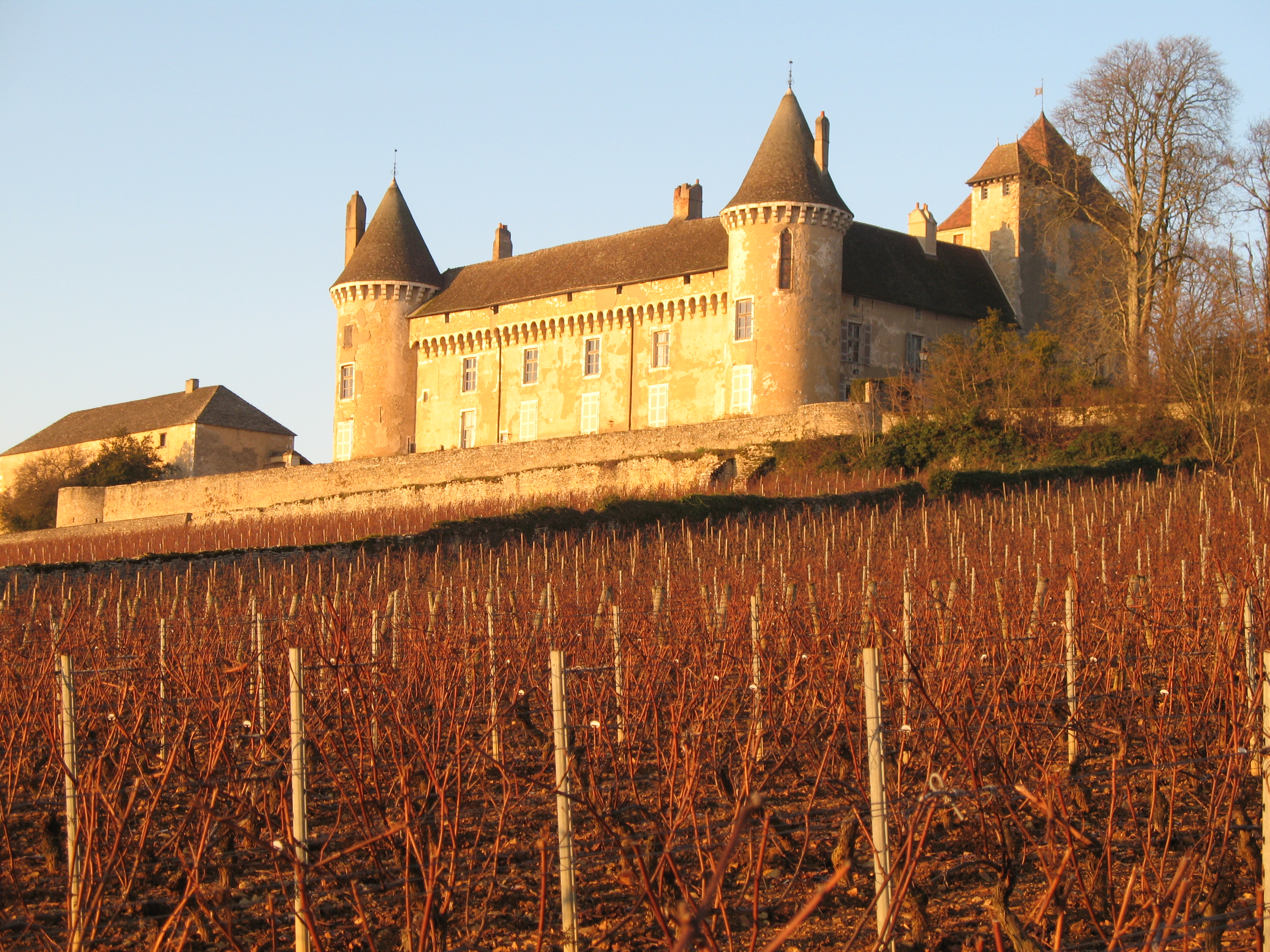
- Château de Rully

- Location within France
- 46°52′9″N 4°44′07″E

History
- Original use: Château

Site notes
- Current use: Private residence
- Website: http://www.chateauderully.com

Monument historique
- Designated: 1960

The Château de Rully is a castle in the commune of Rully in the Saône-et-Loire département of France. Located on the side of a hill, the castle dominates the whole region, facing the plain leading to the Saône. To the west, it commands the valley towards Nantoux and Chassey-le-Camp.

== Description ==
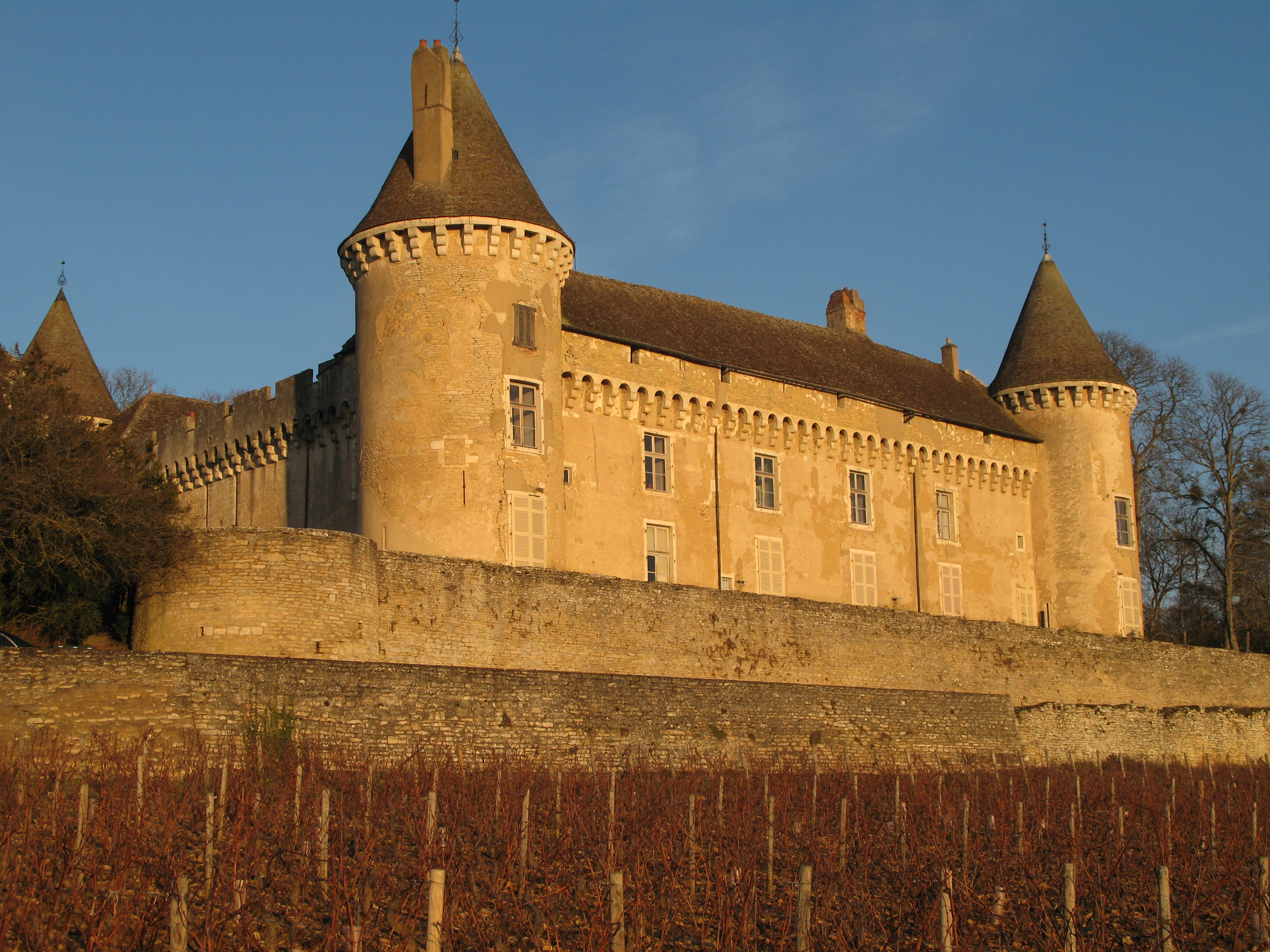
Château de Rully

At the end of the 14th century, the castle consisted of a square keep, three round corner towers and one flanking tower. All the elements are connected by curtain walls with a covered round walk, and crenelated at the top. There was a protective broad, deep moat surrounding the base, as well as a single drawbridge, the location of which is still visible on the southern face. In the 15th century, the Saint-Leger family added on the east, north and west of the interior courtyard, a succession of buildings with splendid oak woodwork, supporting the corbelling of the round walk which was covered with flat Burgundian tiles. At the end of the 19th century, alterations concealed certain aspects of the medieval structure. For example, the moat was filled in, the drawbridge and the large, protective, courtyard doors were removed, and a neo-Gothic building with machicolation was constructed inside the courtyard at the foot of the keep.

The ground floor rooms of the towers are arched and the bedrooms and the corridors are covered with ceilings with exposed beams and joists.

Lava roofed farm buildings, the remainders of the old lower courtyard, surround the large external courtyard and serve as an avenue of honour in front of the gate.

The castle is privately owned but is open to visitors. It is listed as a monument historique on the supplementary inventory of the French Ministry of Culture.

== History ==
- 851: Earliest mention
- 920: Rully was made part of the holdings of the powerful house of Vergy.
- 1194: The castle belonged to Hugues de Rully.
- 14th century: After the Rully family, the Duke of Burgundy gave the land to a knight returning from the Crusades, Robert de Saint-Léger, who married Isabelle de Rully.
- 15th century: The Saint-Léger family made the castle habitable.
- 1619: By inheritance, the castle went to the Montessus family, whose descendants are still owners.
- Revolutionary era: A certificate of the commune of Rully, in connection with the marquise of Montessus, held for some time in the prison of Chalon, attests that "les malheureux ont toujours trouvé en elle une mère, l'opprimé un soutien" ("the unhappy always found in it a mother, the oppressed support").
- Modern era: Property of the comte d'Aviau de Ternay, descendant of the Montessus.

== See also ==
- List of castles in France

== Bibliography ==
- Grivot, P. & F.: Notes sur l'histoire de Rully, (1971)
- de Ternay, J.: Notice à l'usage des visiteurs de Rully
- Perrault-Dabot, A.: Rully, (1922)
