= Aubert de Villaine =

French wine expert

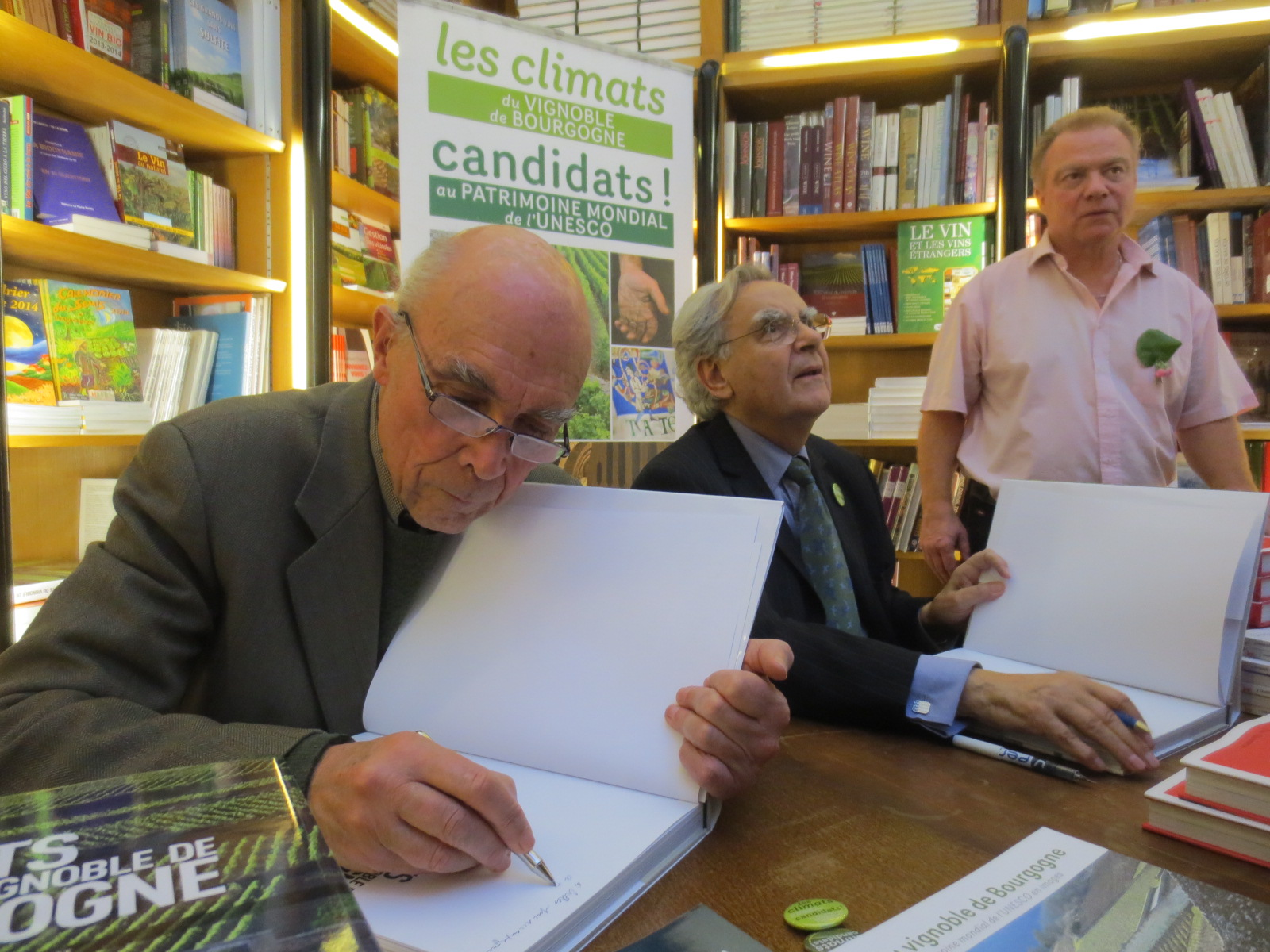
Aubert de Villaine (left) signs books with Bernard Pivot (center) at the 2013 Hospices de Beaune charity wine auction

Aubert de Villaine is a social economist and co-owner of the Domaine de la Romanée-Conti; he served as the Domaine's co-director from 1974 to 2021, stepping down to an advisory role in 2022. Some of the world's most expensive wines are produced on several of its approximately 50-acre (20 ha) vineyard holdings in Vosne-Romanée and Montrachet. He was originally co-director with Lalou Bize-Leroy, both having inherited their ownership. However, disagreements over the direction of the estate, led to Bize-Leroy's 1991 expulsion from the management and her replacement by her nephews, Charles and later Henry-Frédéric Roch, and eventually Bize-Leroy's daughter, Perrine Fenal, in 2018. De Villaine resigned from co-directorship at the end of 2021 and was replaced by his own nephew, Bertrand de Villaine.

Together with his wife Pamela, Aubert also owns and runs a domain in Bouzeron named Domaine de Villaine (alternately A et P de Villaine on some labels). This domain has extensive plantings of Aligoté Doré (golden Aligoté as opposed to the more greenish Aligoté Vert which is considered by many top winemakers in Burgundy to make inferior wine and the de Villaines were part of the campaign to create a separate appellation for the Aligoté wines of Bouzeron, which succeeded in 1998, when the Bouzeron AOC was created.

Aubert de Villaine is also the Director of HdV (Hyde de Villaine) Wines, a highly regarded winery in Napa Valley, California with an adjacent wholly owned 40 acre vineyard. Founded in 2000, most of the partnership's fruit is sourced from the nearby 170 acre Hyde Vineyard in the Los Carneros appellation.

He served as a judge at the Paris Wine Tasting of 1976.

He is the great-grandson of Peter von Baranoff (Peter’s daughter Olga was Aubert’s maternal grandmother).
