= Chassey-le-Camp =

- Commune
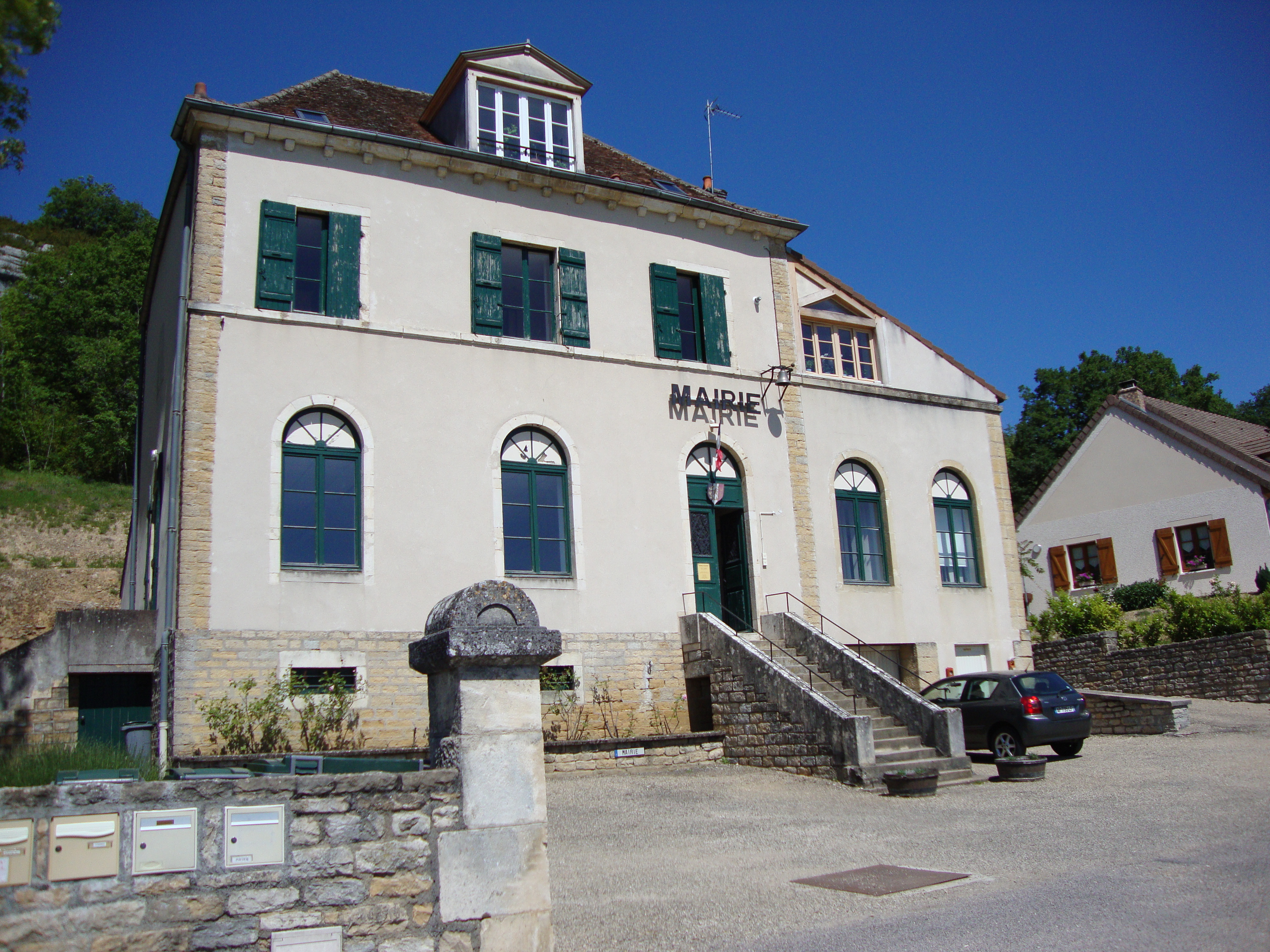
- The town hall in Chassey-le-Camp
- Location of Chassey-le-Camp
- Location within France Location within Bourgogne-Franche-Comté
- Coordinates: 46°53′15″N 4°41′50″E
- Country: France
- Region: Bourgogne-Franche-Comté
- Department: Saône-et-Loire
- Arrondissement: Chalon-sur-Saône
- Canton: Chagny
- Intercommunality: CA Le Grand Chalon
- Area^{1}: 8.62 km^{2} (3.33 sq mi)
- Elevation: 357 m (1,171 ft)
- Highest elevation: 432 m (1,417 ft)
- Lowest elevation: 216 m (709 ft)
- Population (2023): 366
  - Density: 42.5/km^{2} (110/sq mi)
- Time zone: UTC+01:00 (CET)
  - Summer (DST): UTC+02:00 (CEST)
- INSEE/Postal code: 71109 /71150
- ^{1} French Land Register data, which excludes lakes, ponds, glaciers > 1 km^{2} (0.386 sq mi or 247 acres) and river estuaries.

Chassey-le-Camp (French pronunciation: [ʃasɛ lə kɑ̃]) is a commune in the Saône-et-Loire department in the region of Bourgogne-Franche-Comté in eastern France.

== History ==
The commune of Chassey-le-Camp is known for giving its name to the archaeological culture of the late Neolithic (Stone Age) named Chasséen.

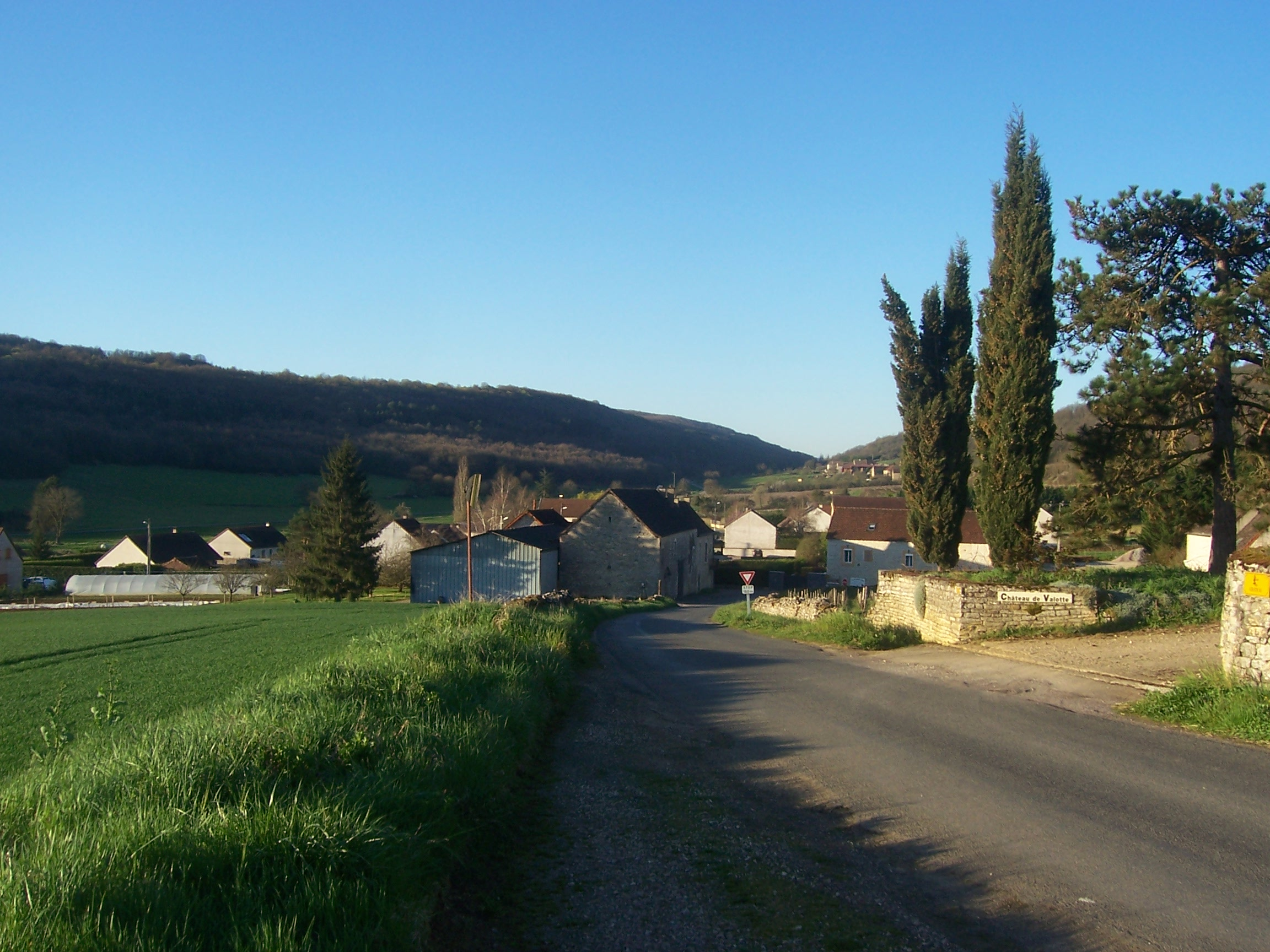
Valotte

== Wine ==
Vineyards of Chassey-le-Camp form part of the Bouzeron appellation d'origine contrôlée in the Cote Chalonnaise sub-region of Burgundy. Bouzeron is an appellation for white wine made exclusively from the Aligoté grape, created in 1998. Pinot noir and Chardonnay wines are also produced in the commune, but sold under the appellations Bourgogne rouge or blanc or Bourgogne Côte Chalonnaise.

== See also ==
- Communes of the Saône-et-Loire department
