= Bouzeron AOC =

Bouzeron is an appellation d'origine contrôlée (AOC) for white wine produced in the French communes of Bouzeron and Chassey-le-Camp in the Côte Chalonnaise subregion of Burgundy. Bouzeron wine is produced from the grape variety Aligoté, and Bouzeron AOC is therefore the only communal-level Burgundy appellation for Aligoté-based wines. Other Aligoté wines from Burgundy are restricted to the regional appellation Bourgogne Aligoté AOC, and all other white Burgundy wines from communal appellations (except Saint Bris AOC) are Chardonnay-based. However, Pinot blanc is technically allowed.

The Bouzeron AOC was created in 1998, and at this time replaced the Bourgogne Aligoté de Bouzeron AOC, which had been introduced in 1979 within the Bourgogne Aligoté AOC. There are no Premier Cru vineyards in the Bouzeron AOC. The move towards an own appellation for Bouzeron and its Aligoté was spearheaded by the efforts of Aubert de Villaine, co-owner of Domaine de la Romanee-Conti. Together with his wife Pamela de Villaine he owns Domaine A & P de Villaine in Bouzeron.

== Wine style ==
The wines of this appellation are more similar in style and fruit characteristics to Pinot gris than to Chardonnay. The wines tend to be light bodied with subtle spice notes that are usually most vibrant up to five years after vintage.

Pinot noir- and Chardonnay-based wine are also grown in the same geographical area but are typically sold under the regional appellations Bourgogne Rouge and Bourgogne Blanc. They could also be sold as Bourgogne Côte Chalonnaise AOC, but not as Bouzeron AOC.

== Production ==
In 2008, 47.05 hectares (116.3 acres) of vineyard surface was in production for Bouzeron AOC, and 2,459 hectoliter of wine was produced, corresponding to just under 330,000 bottles of white wine.

== AOC regulations ==
The AOC regulations require 100% Aligoté for Bouzeron, and a planting density of at least 8,000 vines per hectare. The allowed base yield is 55 hectoliter per hectare, and the grapes must reach a maturity of at least 9.5 per cent potential alcohol.
