= Climats, terroirs of Burgundy =

The Climats, terroirs of Burgundy
UNESCO World Heritage Site
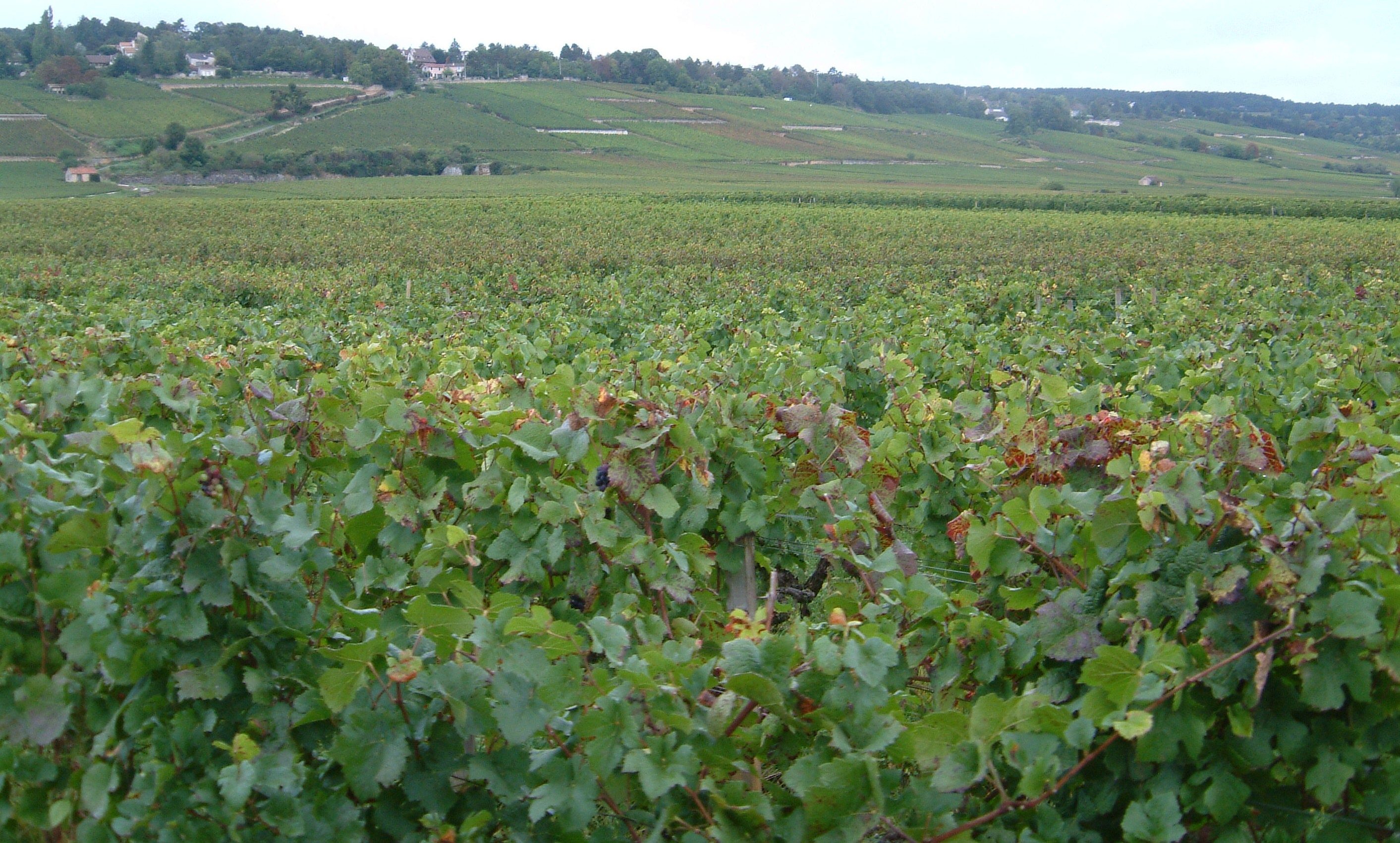
- Vineyard in the vicinity of Beaune

- Location within France
- Location: France
- Includes: 1. Les climats du vignoble de Bourgogne; 2. Les climats du vignoble de Bourgogne - Dijon
- Criteria: Cultural: (iii), (v)
- Reference: 1425
- Inscription: 2015 (39th Session)
- Area: 13,219 ha (32,660 acres)
- Buffer zone: 50,011 ha (123,580 acres)
- Coordinates: 47°03′29″N 4°51′52″E

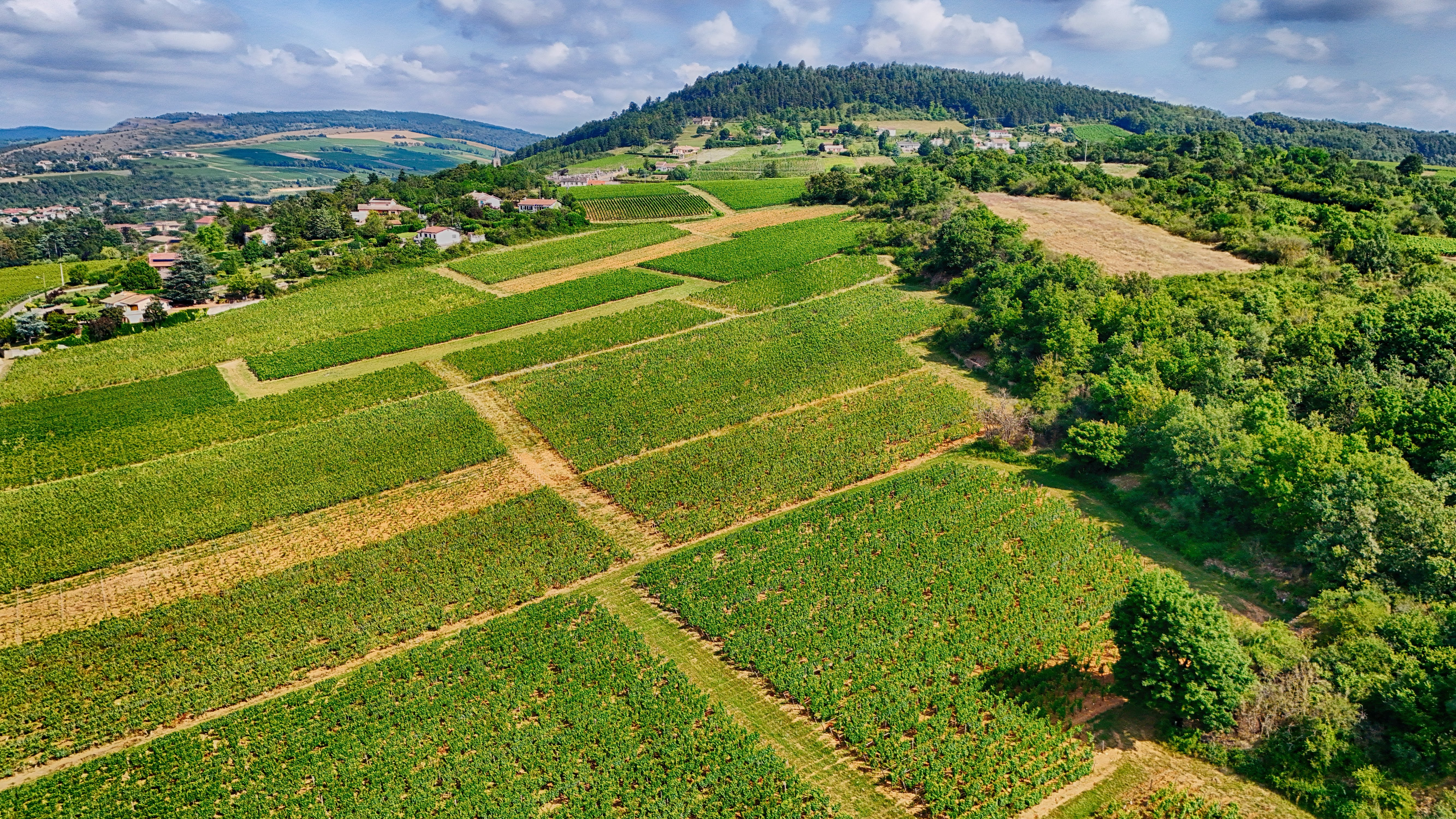
Vineyards on rolling hills in the Burgundy region of eastern France.

Climats, terroirs of Burgundy is a cultural landscape and a series of sites that exemplify the viticulture practices of the Burgundy wine region. The climats are small, precisely delimited land parcels that differ from each other in microclimate, geography, soil, and grape type. The Burgundy climats are the birthplace of the terroir system of French wine, where each geographical region has its own unique wine. The region was inscribed on the UNESCO World Heritage List in 2015 because of its historic significance and its importance in the production and development of wine.

== Description and History ==
The world heritage site consists of two parts: The first is the historic center of Dijon, where the precisely parceled climats have been defined and regulated since the Middle Ages. The second part of the site encompasses the vineyards and wine production sites near the town of Beaune and the Côte de Nuits and Côte de Beaune regions south of Dijon. The region is dominated by clay-limestone soils, but the extreme variance in soil composition, microclimate, and geography has led to a wide diversity of wines. In total, roughly 1247 different Climats exist, each with their own particular definition and certification by the Appellation d'origine contrôlée (AOC). Many of the boundaries of these parcels (marked by paths, stone walls, or fences) were built in 1938 and are still visible today.

In the 5th and 6th centuries, with the spread of Christianity to the region, vineyards were established on the slopes of the Côtes. The development of Cistercian order in the 11th century and the ownership of vineyards by members of the bourgeoisie in the 12th and 13th centuries contributed to the highly parceled nature of the landscape. In the 16th century, the concept of the climats was developed, with each parcel boasting its own wine. This system developed into the AOC and the current concept of describing wines from the precise location where they were produced.
