= Bourgogne Live =

- Available in: French
- Creators: François Desperriers and Aurélien Ibanez
- Website: www.bourgogne-live.com
- Current status: Active

Bourgogne Live is a website devoted to wine and gastronomy with a particular focus on the Burgundy region of France and Burgundy wine. In 2010, the website was listed by Wikio as the most read wine website in France.

== Web content ==
The website is run by François Desperriers and Aurélien Ibanez. They are noted for their niche focus on a single wine region as well as their efforts to modernize the region's image through online tastings, wine video, and communicating on social networking sites.

== Role in the region ==
Bourgogne Live frequently participates in local Burgundy events and reports on them. Notable examples include their video footage of Les Hospices de Beaune and their promotion of Les Climats de Bourgogne as a candidate for UNESCO's World Heritage status.
