= Bouzeron =

- Commune
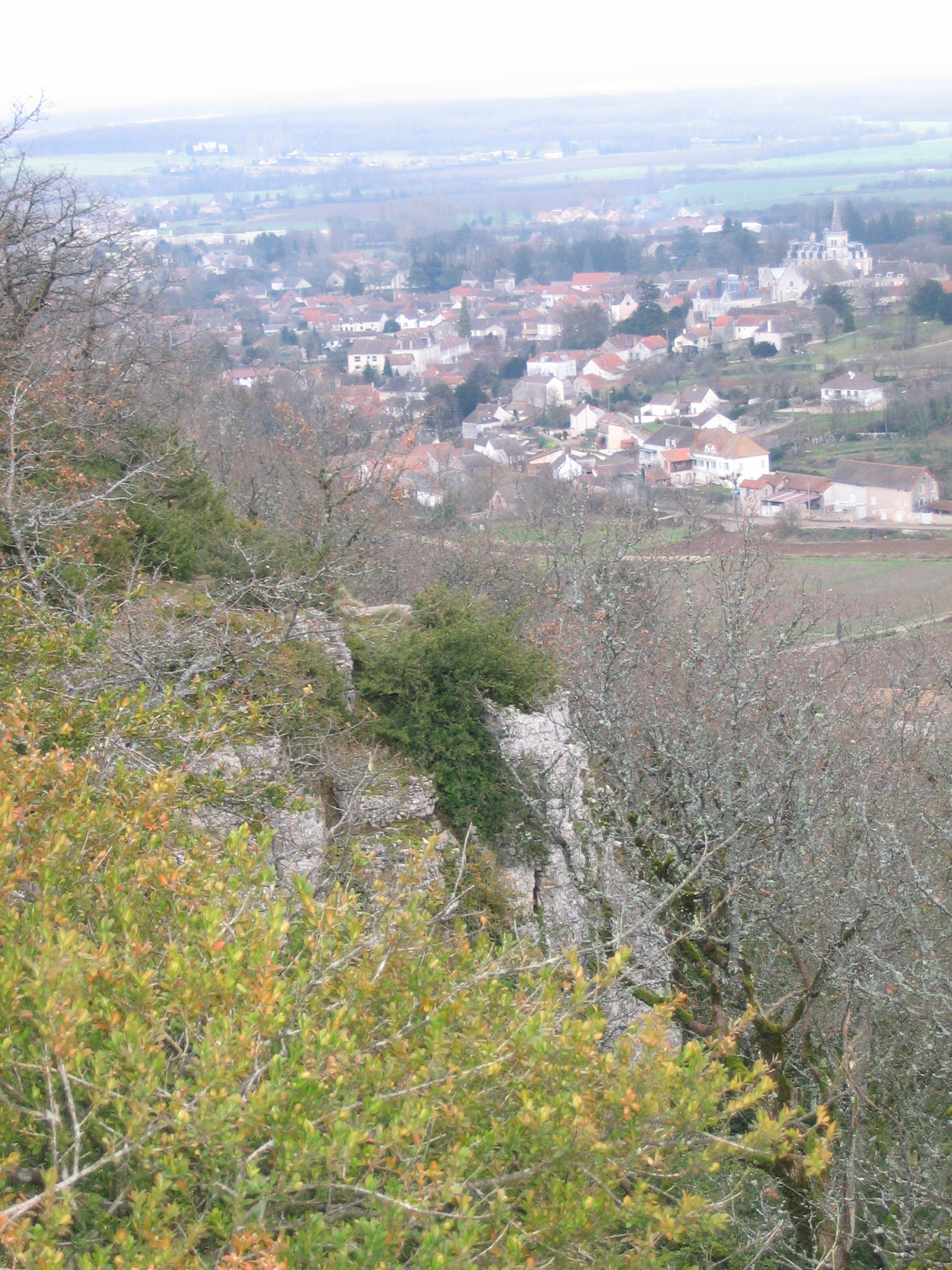
- Location of Bouzeron
- Location within France Location within Bourgogne-Franche-Comté
- Coordinates: 46°53′25″N 4°43′38″E
- Country: France
- Region: Bourgogne-Franche-Comté
- Department: Saône-et-Loire
- Arrondissement: Chalon-sur-Saône
- Canton: Chagny
- Intercommunality: CA Le Grand Chalon

Government
  - Mayor (2024–2026): Yves Martin
- Area^{1}: 3.7 km^{2} (1.4 sq mi)
- Elevation: 350 m (1,150 ft)
- Highest elevation: 405 m (1,329 ft)
- Lowest elevation: 221 m (725 ft)
- Population (2023): 143
  - Density: 39/km^{2} (100/sq mi)
- Time zone: UTC+01:00 (CET)
  - Summer (DST): UTC+02:00 (CEST)
- INSEE/Postal code: 71051 /71150
- ^{1} French Land Register data, which excludes lakes, ponds, glaciers > 1 km^{2} (0.386 sq mi or 247 acres) and river estuaries.

Bouzeron (French pronunciation: [buzʁɔ̃]) is a commune in the Saône-et-Loire department in Bourgogne-Franche-Comté in eastern France.

== Geography ==
Bouzeron is a wine-growing village located near Chagny. It is 15–20 kilometers (9.3–12.4 miles) from Beaune and 25 kilometres (16 mi) from Chalon-sur-Saône.

== Wine ==
Bouzeron is also an appellation d'origine contrôlée in the Cote Chalonnaise sub-region of Burgundy for a white wine made exclusively from the Aligoté grape, created in 1998. It is the only communal appellation for Aligoté wine, the rest of them being sold under the regional appellation Bourgogne Aligoté AOC. Pinot noir and Chardonnay wines are also produced in the commune, but sold under the appellations Bourgogne rouge or blanc or Bourgogne Côte Chalonnaise.

== See also ==
- Communes of the Saône-et-Loire department
