= Fromenteau =

Fromenteau (sometimes called Beurot) is the name for several grape varieties, most importantly the medieval name for a Burgundian variety which had pale red berries and white juice, and is probably the ancestor of Pinot gris.

It is also used as a synonym for the several grapes

- Roussanne of the Rhône

== Other usages ==
- Fromenteau Gris is furthermore a synonym of Pinot Gris
- Fromenteau Rouge a synonym of Savagnin Rose and possibly Gewürztraminer
