= Rully wine =

Regional French wine

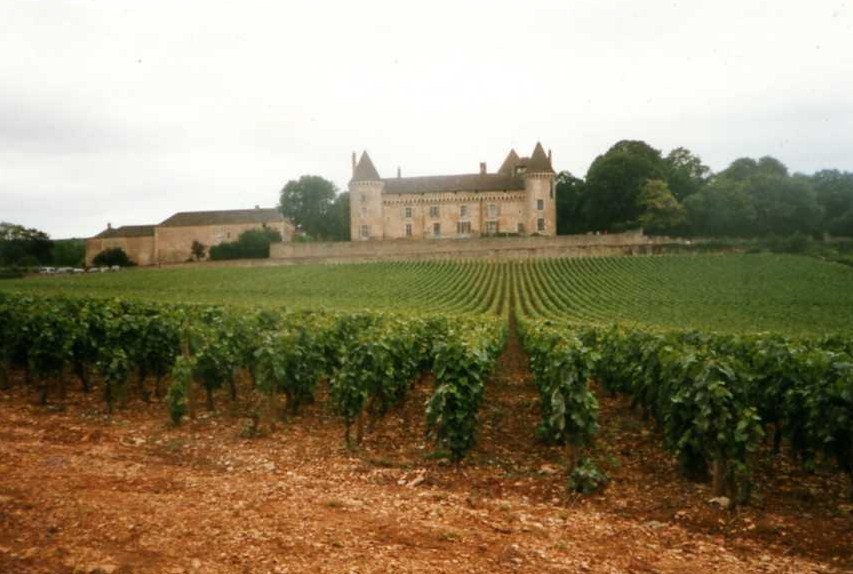
Rully vineyards at Château de Rully.

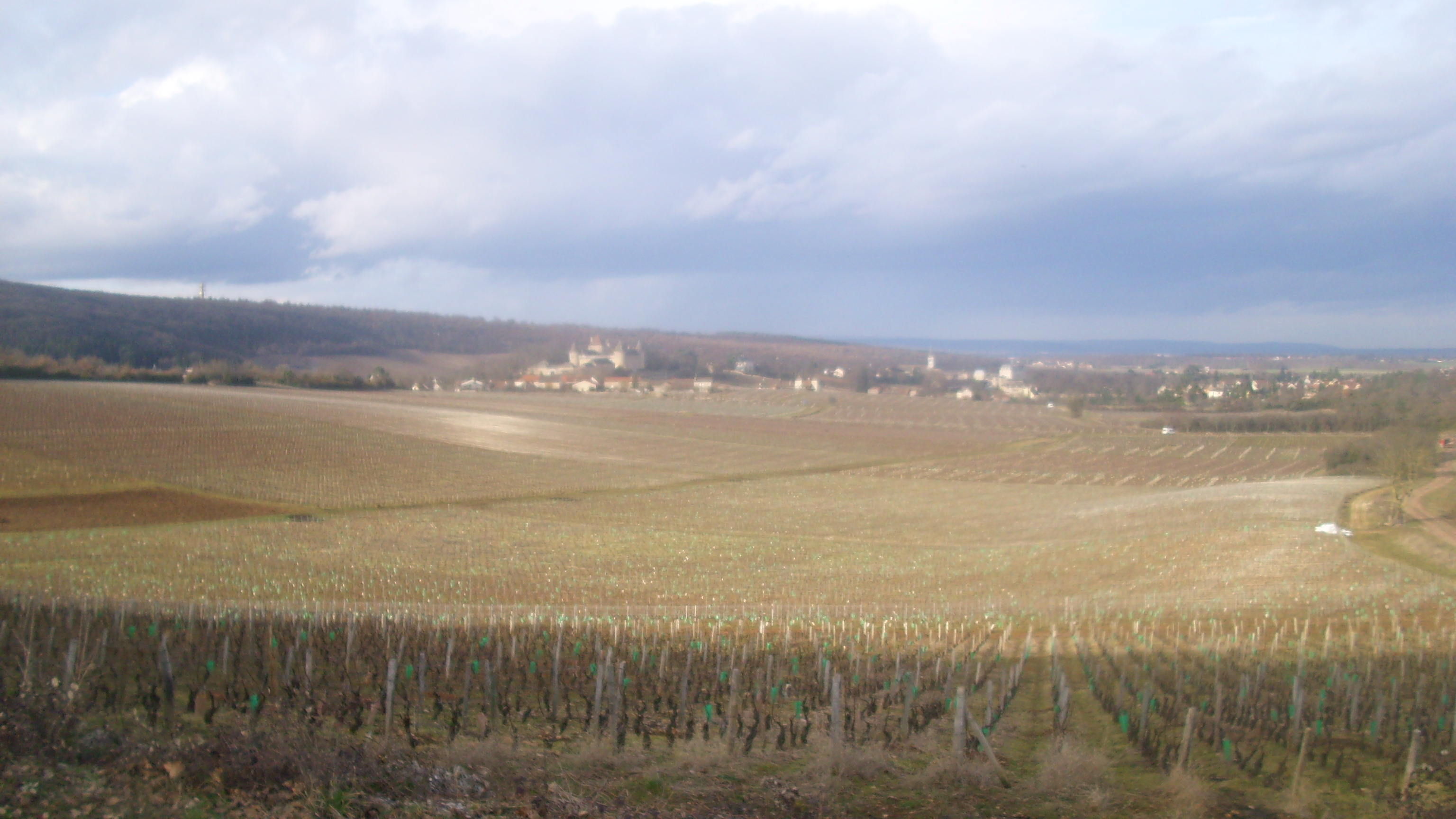
Rully vineyards

Rully wine is produced in the communes of Rully and Chagny in the Côte Chalonnaise subregion of Burgundy. The Appellation d'origine contrôlée (AOC) Rully may be used for red and white wine with respectively Pinot noir and Chardonnay as the main grape variety. Around two-thirds of the production consists of white wine, and around one-third is red. There are 23 Premier Cru vineyards within Rully AOC, but no Grand Cru vineyards exist in this part of Burgundy. The AOC was created in 1939.

== Production ==
In 2008, 357.03 hectares (882.2 acres) of vineyard surface was in production for Rully at village and Premier Cru level, and 16,057 hectoliter of wine was produced, of which 5,300 hectoliter red wine and 10,757 hectoliter white wine. Some 223.56 hectares (552.4 acres) of this area was used for the white wines. The total amount produced corresponds to over 2.1 million bottles, of which just over 700,000 bottles of red wine and just over 1.4 million bottles of white wine.

== Premiers Crus ==
There are 23 climats within the Rully AOC classified as Premier Cru vineyards. Their wines are designated Rully Premier Cru + vineyard name, or as just Rully Premier Cru, in which case it is possible to blend wine from several Premier Cru vineyards within the AOC.

In 2008, 96 hectares (240 acres) of the total Rully vineyard surface consisted of Premier Cru vineyards, of which 37.19 hectares (91.9 acres) red and 58.81 hectares (145.3 acres) white Rully Premier Cru. The annual production of Premier Cru wine, as a five-year average, is 1,185 hectoliter of red wine and 3,366 hectoliter of white wine.

The following Premier Cru vineyards are located in the commune of Rully:

- Le Meix Caillet
- Marissou
- La Fosse
- Les Pierres
- Pillot
- Raclot
- Les Cloux
- Rabourcé
- Chapitre
- Les Préaux
- Molesme
- Agneux
- La Bressande
- Les Champs Cloux
- Le Meix Cadot
- Les Montpalais
- Grésigny
- Les Margotés
- La Renarde
- Vauvry
- La Pucelle

The following Premier Cru vineyards are located in the commune of Chagny:

- Clos du Chaigne (à Jean de France)
- Clos Saint-Jacques
