= Bourgogne Aligoté AOC =

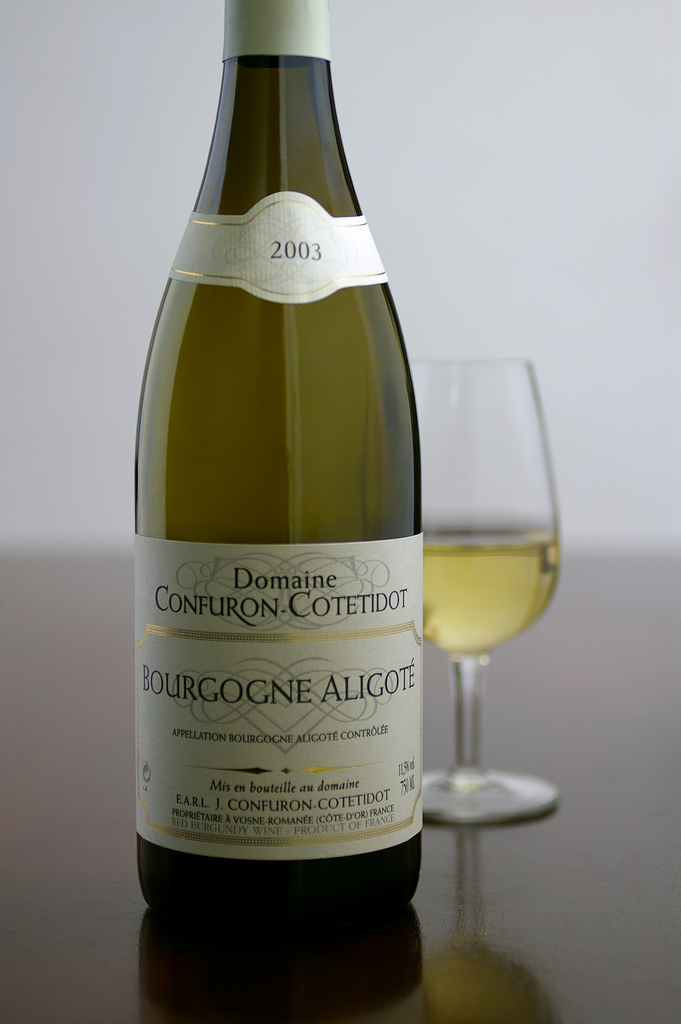
A bottle and glass of Bourgogne Aligoté AOC wine.

Bourgogne Aligoté is an Appellation d'origine contrôlée (AOC) for white wine produced from the Aligoté grape variety in the region of Burgundy in France. The AOC was created in 1937.

Approximately 1,700 hectares (4,200 acres) of Burgundy vineyards were devoted to the production of Bourgogne Aligoté in 2007, and the average annual production over the period 2003–2007 was 107,470 hectoliter.

== Production ==
Bourgogne Aligoté is a regional AOC, which means that the wines can be produced in all of the Burgundy region. Since 1998, there is also a delimited AOC for Aligoté-based wines called Bouzeron, which used to be known as Bourgogne Aligoté Bouzeron.

== Grapes and wine style ==
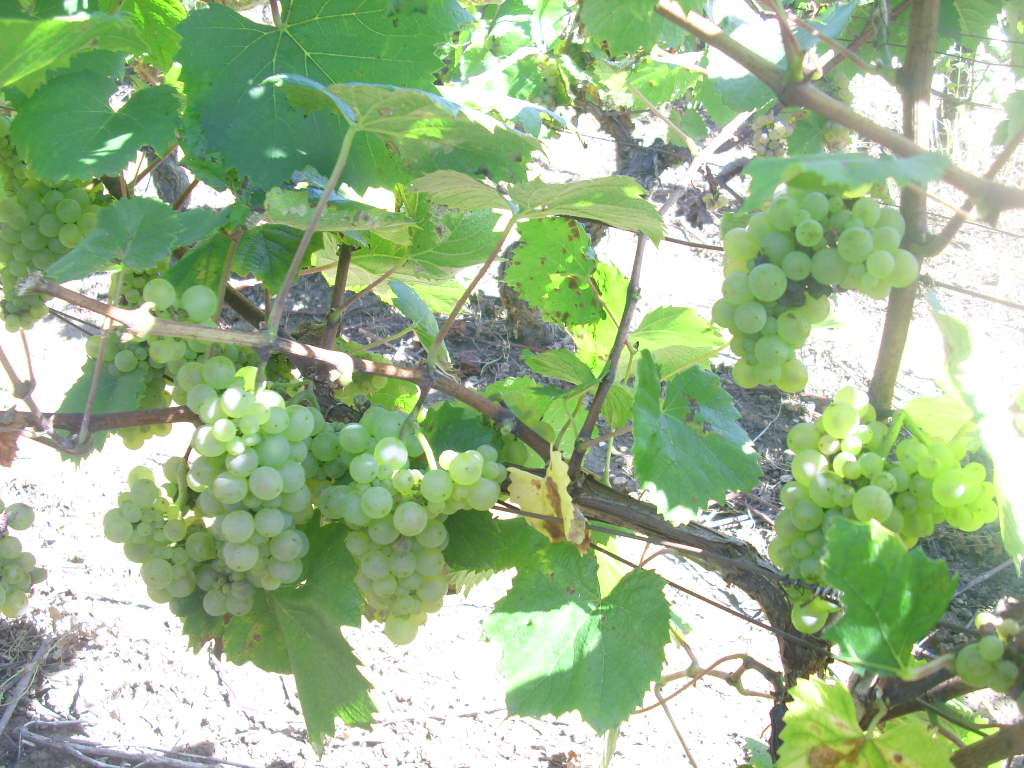
Aligoté grapes.

While the primary grape is Aligoté, AOC regulations allow up to 15% Chardonnay to be blended into these wines. The wines tend to be light and acidic in style, and are usually unoaked, in contrast to many of Burgundy's more common and more noted Chardonnay-based white wines. Bourgogne Aligoté is frequently mixed together with crème de cassis to make kir, a traditional pre-dinner drink.
