= Rully, Saône-et-Loire =

Rully
- Commune
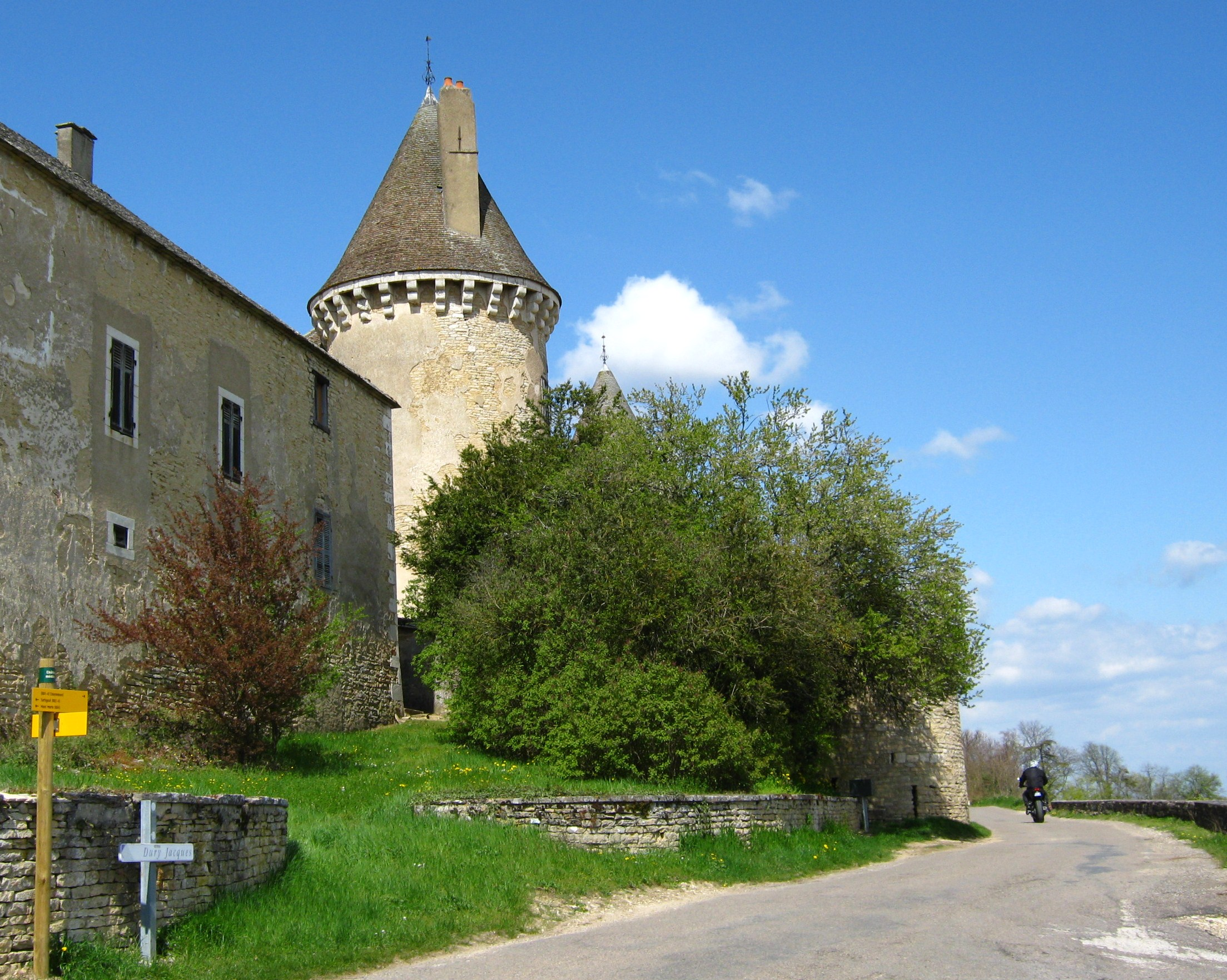
- The chateau in Rully

- Coat of arms
- Location of Rully
- Location within France Location within Bourgogne-Franche-Comté
- Coordinates: 46°52′34″N 4°44′27″E
- Country: France
- Region: Bourgogne-Franche-Comté
- Department: Saône-et-Loire
- Arrondissement: Chalon-sur-Saône
- Canton: Chagny
- Intercommunality: CA Le Grand Chalon
- Area^{1}: 15.61 km^{2} (6.03 sq mi)
- Elevation: 210 m (690 ft)
- Highest elevation: 407 m (1,335 ft)
- Lowest elevation: 194 m (636 ft)
- Population (2023): 1,609
  - Density: 103.1/km^{2} (267.0/sq mi)
- Time zone: UTC+01:00 (CET)
  - Summer (DST): UTC+02:00 (CEST)
- INSEE/Postal code: 71378 /71150
- ^{1} French Land Register data, which excludes lakes, ponds, glaciers > 1 km^{2} (0.386 sq mi or 247 acres) and river estuaries.

Rully is a commune in the Saône-et-Loire department in the region of Bourgogne-Franche-Comté in eastern France.

It is known for its red and white Rully wines made from Pinot noir and Chardonnay respectively. The AOC legal area encompasses the village of Chagny as well as Rully itself, contains over twenty Premier Cru designated sub-areas, and borders the Cote Chalonnaise appellations of Bouzeron to the west and Mercurey to the south.

== See also ==
- Communes of the Saône-et-Loire department
- Rully wine
