= Aligoté =

Variety of grape

- Grape (Vitis)
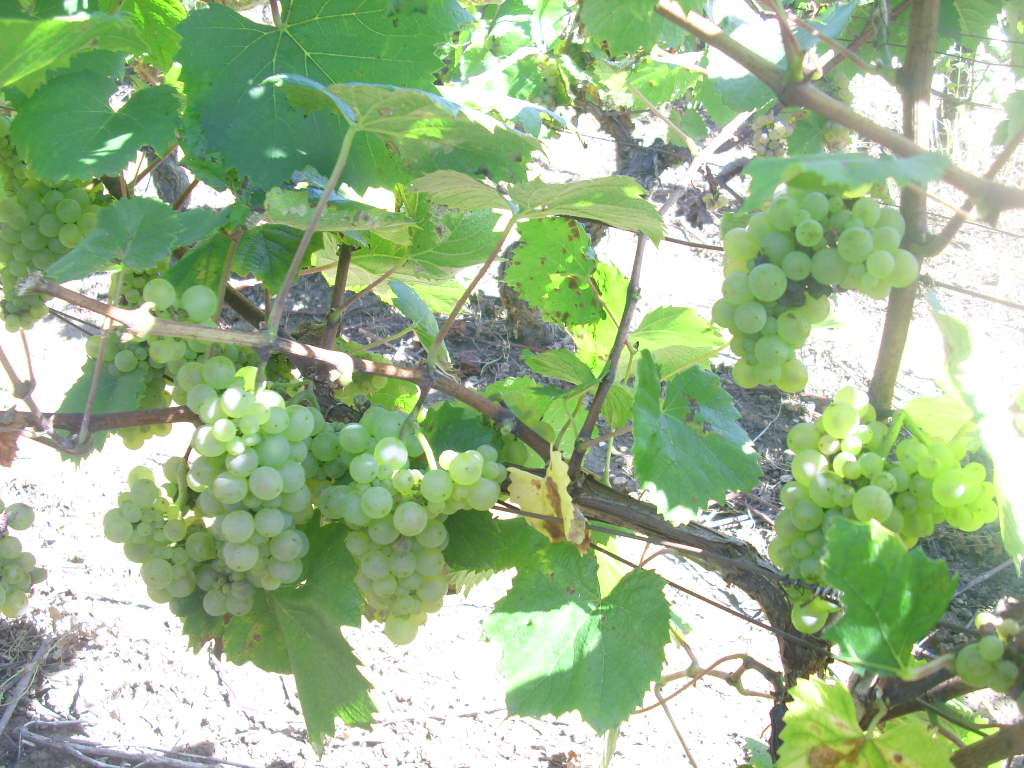
- Color of berry skin: Blanc
- Species: Vitis vinifera
- Also called: Blanc de Troyes, Vert blanc, Chaudenet gris, Plant gris, and other synonyms
- Origin: France
- Notable regions: (see major regions)
- VIVC number: 312

Aligoté is a white grape used to make dry white wines, especially in the Burgundy region of France where it was first recorded in the 18th century. Since it is tolerant to cold, this variety is also cultivated in Eastern European countries. In 2004, it was the 22nd most planted vine variety in the world at 45,000 hectares (110,000 acres).

== Description ==
Aligoté is used to produce a varietal white wine, and is sometimes included in the blend of Burgundian sparkling wine known as Crémant de Bourgogne. The varietal appellation Bourgogne Aligoté AOC is made exclusively from Aligoté grapes. Traditionally, the cocktail kir (also known as vin blanc cassis in French) is made by adding cassis to an Aligoté wine. In blends, Aligoté adds acidity and structure to other varieties. It is often blended with Sacy for this purpose.

The grape ripens early with moderate yields and produces wines high in acidity that can be drunk young. Its aroma includes elements of apples and lemons. Clive Coates says it is a variety of secondary importance in Burgundy which produces a light, primeur-style wine with slightly herbal flavour and rather higher acidity than the Chardonnay. The village of Bouzeron is considered to represent the region's finest examples of the variety with the appellation Bouzeron-Aligoté AOC restricting the yields to 45 hl/ha compared to the Bourgogne Aligoté AOC limited to 60 hl/ha.

== Regional production ==
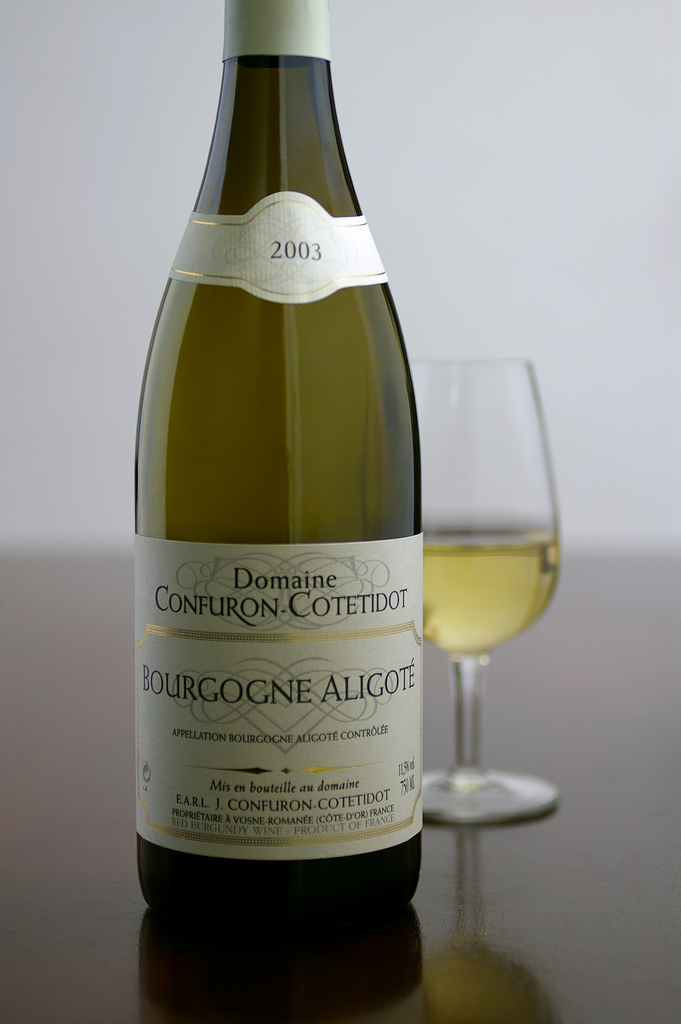
Aligoté wine from Burgundy.

The grape is the second most popular white grape variety grown in Burgundy after Chardonnay, though it lies a long way behind in terms of planted area, with 1,700 hectares (4,200 acres) against 12,800 hectares (32,000 acres). The vines were once inter-planted and field blended with Chardonnay for the benefit of added acidity but the vines have long since been separated. Aligoté often loses territory to more prestigious grape varieties and in some areas is relegated to less productive vineyard sections at the tops and bottoms of the slopes. In Burgundy the grape can be found along the fringe edges of the Côte-d'Or along Route Nationale 74, as well as in Mâconnais and Côte Chalonnaise. There are also small plantings just east of the Rhone Valley around the city Die and in the commune of Pierrevert in the Alpes-de-Haute-Provence. It has its own AOC's, Bourgogne Aligoté and Bouzeron.

Aligoté is also produced in Eastern European countries, including Ukraine, Bulgaria, Romania, Switzerland and Moldova. In Bulgaria, the grape is prized for its blending qualities and high acid; the quantity of Aligoté planted in Bulgaria is more than twice that in the grape's ancestral home of Burgundy. The grape is primarily found in the Stara Zagora Province around Chirpan. In Russia, it is used to make sparkling wines with varietal wines being made along the coast of the Black Sea around Gelendzhik.

Globally, Aligoté can be found in smaller plantings. It has been produced, though in very small quantity, by Australian wineries. In the United States, the wine is grown in Washington State, since it is resistant to the cold weather, and in California, where it is used mostly for blending. There have also been small, experimental plantings in Chile. In Canada, the grape is grown in Niagara by Chateau de Charmes.

== Origins ==
DNA fingerprinting has found Aligoté to be a crossing of Pinot noir and Gouais blanc, an ancestry consistent with an origin in Burgundy or nearby areas of eastern France.

== Synonyms ==
Synonyms for Aligoté include Aligotay, Alligotay, Alligoté, Blanc de Troyes, Carcairone blanc, Carcarone, Carchierone, Chaudenet, Chaudenet Gras, Giboudot blanc, Griset blanc, Karkarone Blank, Melon de Jura, Muhranuli, Mukhranudi, Pistone, Plant de Trois, Plant de Trois Raisins, Plant gris, Purion blanc, Selon Molon, Selon Odart, Troyen blanc, Vert blanc.
