= Burgundy wine =

Wine made in the Burgundy region in east-central France

Burgundy
- Wine region
- Official name: Bourgogne
- Type: Wine region
- Year established: AOC in 1936
- Country: France
- Sub-regions: Côte d'Auxerre (Chablis); Côte de Nuits; Côte de Beaune; Côte Chalonnaise; Mâconnais; Beaujolais
- Climate region: Zone C I
- Soil conditions: Argilo-limestone
- Size of planted vineyards: 29,500 hectares 25,000 classified as AOC vineyards
- No. of vineyards: 100 AOCs
- Grapes produced: 59.5% of white varieties, 33.8% of red varieties and 6.7% of crémant
- Varietals produced: Pinot noir, Gamay, Chardonnay, Aligoté
- Official designation(s): Regional, village, 1^{er} cru and Grand cru
- Comments
- Location within France

UNESCO World Heritage Site
- Official name: Les climats du vignoble de Bourgogne
- Location: Yonne, Saône-et-Loire, Côte d'Or, France
- Part of: The Climats, terroirs of Burgundy
- Criteria: Cultural: (iii)(v)
- Reference: 1425-001
- Inscription: 2015 (39th Session)
- Area: 13,118 ha (50.65 sq mi)
- Buffer zone: 50,011 ha (193.09 sq mi)
- Coordinates: 47°3′29″N 4°51′52″E

Burgundy wine (French: Bourgogne or vin de Bourgogne) is a wine made in the Burgundy region of east-central France, in the valleys and slopes west of the Saône, a tributary of the Rhône. The most famous wines produced here, and those commonly referred to as "Burgundies", are dry red wines made from pinot noir grapes and white wines made from chardonnay grapes.

Red and white wines are also made from other grape varieties, such as gamay and aligoté, respectively. Small amounts of rosé and sparkling wines are also produced in the region. Chardonnay-dominated Chablis and gamay-dominated Beaujolais are recognised as part of the Burgundy wine region, but wines from those subregions are usually referred to by their own names rather than as "Burgundy wines".

Burgundy has a higher number of appellations d'origine contrôlée (AOCs) than any other French region, and is often seen as the most terroir-conscious of the French wine regions. The various Burgundy AOCs are classified from carefully delineated grand cru vineyards down to more non-specific regional appellations. The practice of delineating vineyards by their terroir in Burgundy goes back to medieval times, when various monasteries played a key role in developing the Burgundy wine industry. The historical importance of the Burgundy wine region and its unique climats system led to sites in the region being inscribed on the UNESCO World Heritage List as part of the Climats, terroirs of Burgundy site.

== Geography and climate ==
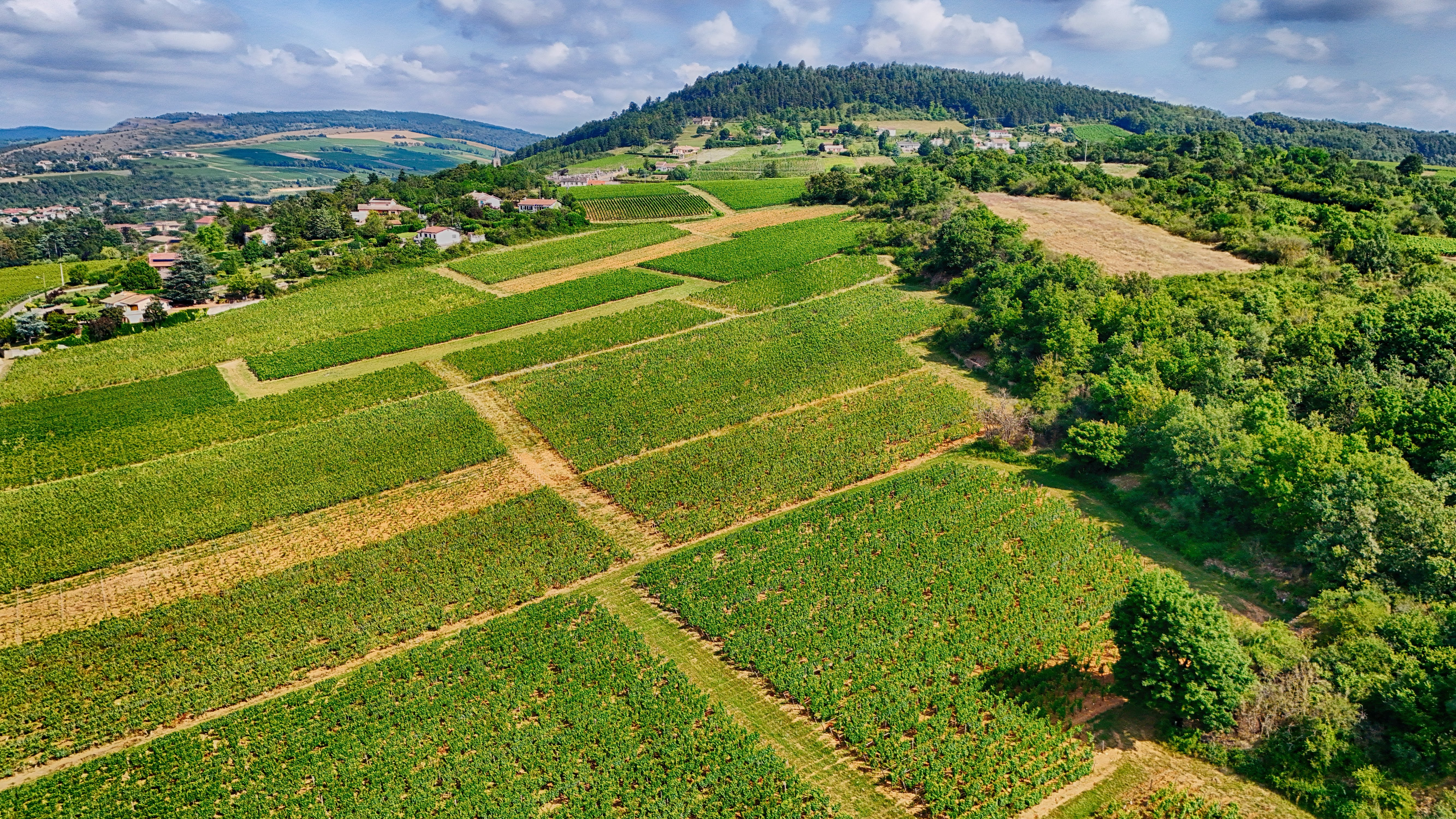
Vineyards in the Burgundy wine region of France

The Burgundy region runs from Auxerre in the north to Mâcon in the south, or to Lyon if the Beaujolais area is included as part of Burgundy. Chablis, a white wine made from Chardonnay grapes, is produced in the area around Auxerre. Other smaller appellations near Chablis include Irancy, which produces red wines and Saint-Bris, which produces white wines from Sauvignon blanc.

There are 100 appellations in Burgundy and these are classified into four quality categories. These are Bourgogne, village, premier cru and grand cru. Eighty-five miles southeast of Chablis is the Côte d'Or, where Burgundy's most famous and most expensive wines originate, and where all Grand Cru vineyards of Burgundy (except for chablis grand cru) are situated. The Côte d'Or itself is split into two parts: the Côte de Nuits which starts just south of Dijon and runs till Corgoloin, a few kilometers south of the town of Nuits-Saint-Georges, and the Côte de Beaune which starts at Ladoix and ends at Dezize-les-Maranges. The wine-growing part of this area in the heart of Burgundy is just 40 kilometres (25 mi) long, and in most places less than 2 kilometres (1.2 mi) wide. The area is made up of tiny villages surrounded by a combination of flat and sloped vineyards on the eastern side of a hilly region, providing some rain and weather shelter from the prevailing westerly winds. The best wines - from grand cru vineyards - of this region are usually grown from the middle and higher part of the slopes, where the vineyards have the most exposure to sunshine and the best drainage, while the premier cru come from a little less favourably exposed slopes. The relatively ordinary "village" wines are produced from the flat territory nearer the villages. The Côte de Nuits contains 24 out of the 25 red grand cru appellations in Burgundy, while all but one of the region's white Grand Cru wines are in the Côte de Beaune (the exception being Musigny blanc). This is explained by the presence of different soils, which favour pinot noir and chardonnay, respectively.

Further south is the Côte Chalonnaise, where again a mix of mostly red and white wines are produced, although the appellations found here such as Mercurey, Rully and Givry are less well-known than their counterparts in the Côte d'Or.

Below the Côte Chalonnaise is the Mâconnais region, known for producing large quantities of easy-drinking and more affordable white wine. Further south again is the Beaujolais region, famous for fruity red wines made from Gamay grapes.

Burgundy's terrain is continental climate characterized by cold winters and hot summers. The weather is unpredictable, with rains, hail, and frost all possible around harvest time. Such a climate results in vintages from Burgundy varying considerably.

== History ==
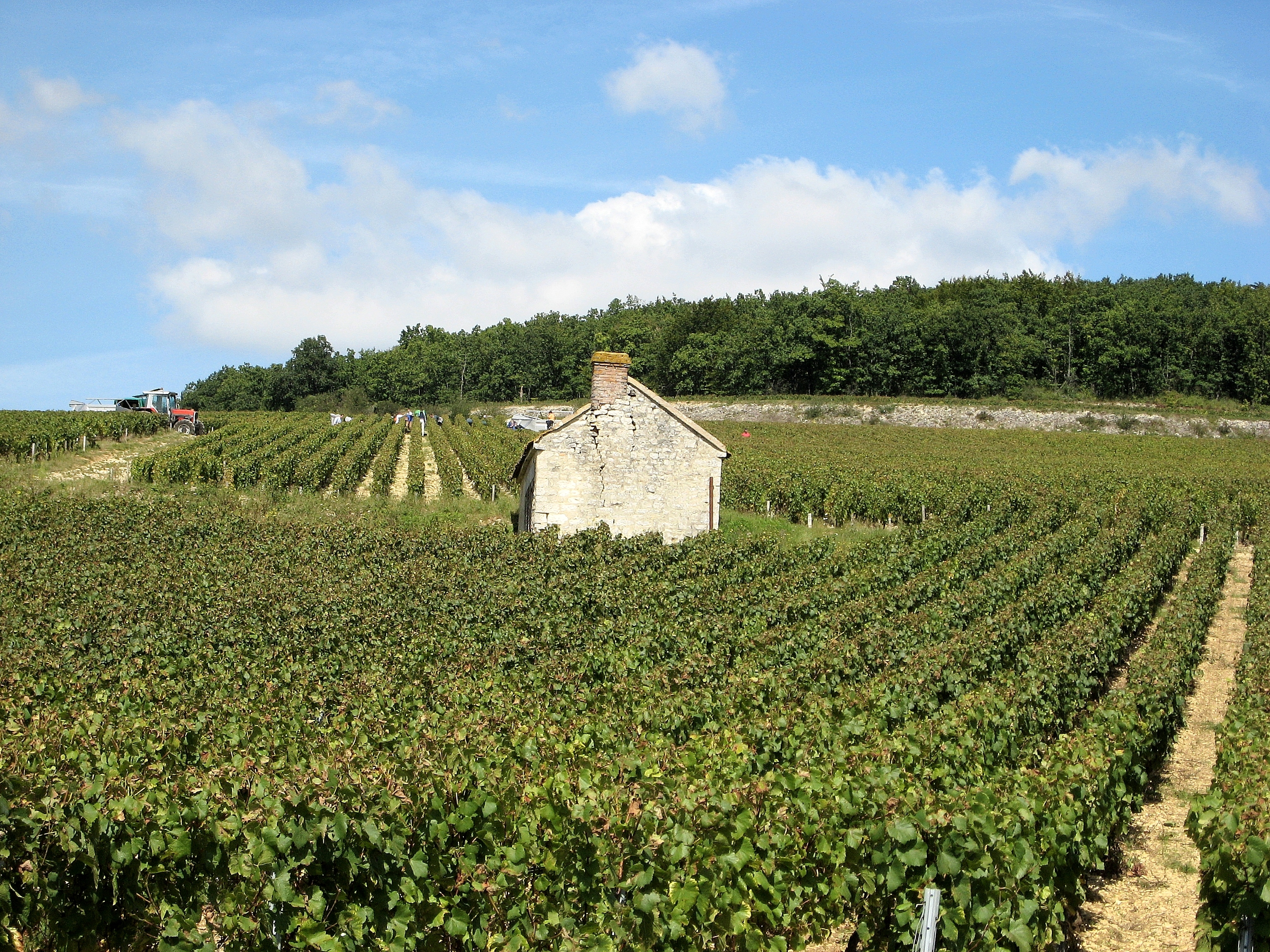
Harvest time in the Chablis Premier Cru of Fourchaume

Archaeological evidence establishes viticulture in Burgundy as early as the second century AD, although the Celts may have been growing vines in the region previous to the Roman conquest of Gaul in 51 BC. Greek traders, for whom viticulture had been practiced since the late Neolithic period, had founded Massalía in about 600 BC, and traded extensively up the Rhône valley, where the Romans first arrived in the second century BC. The earliest recorded praise of the wines of Burgundy was written in 591 by Gregory of Tours, who compared it to the Roman wine Falernian.

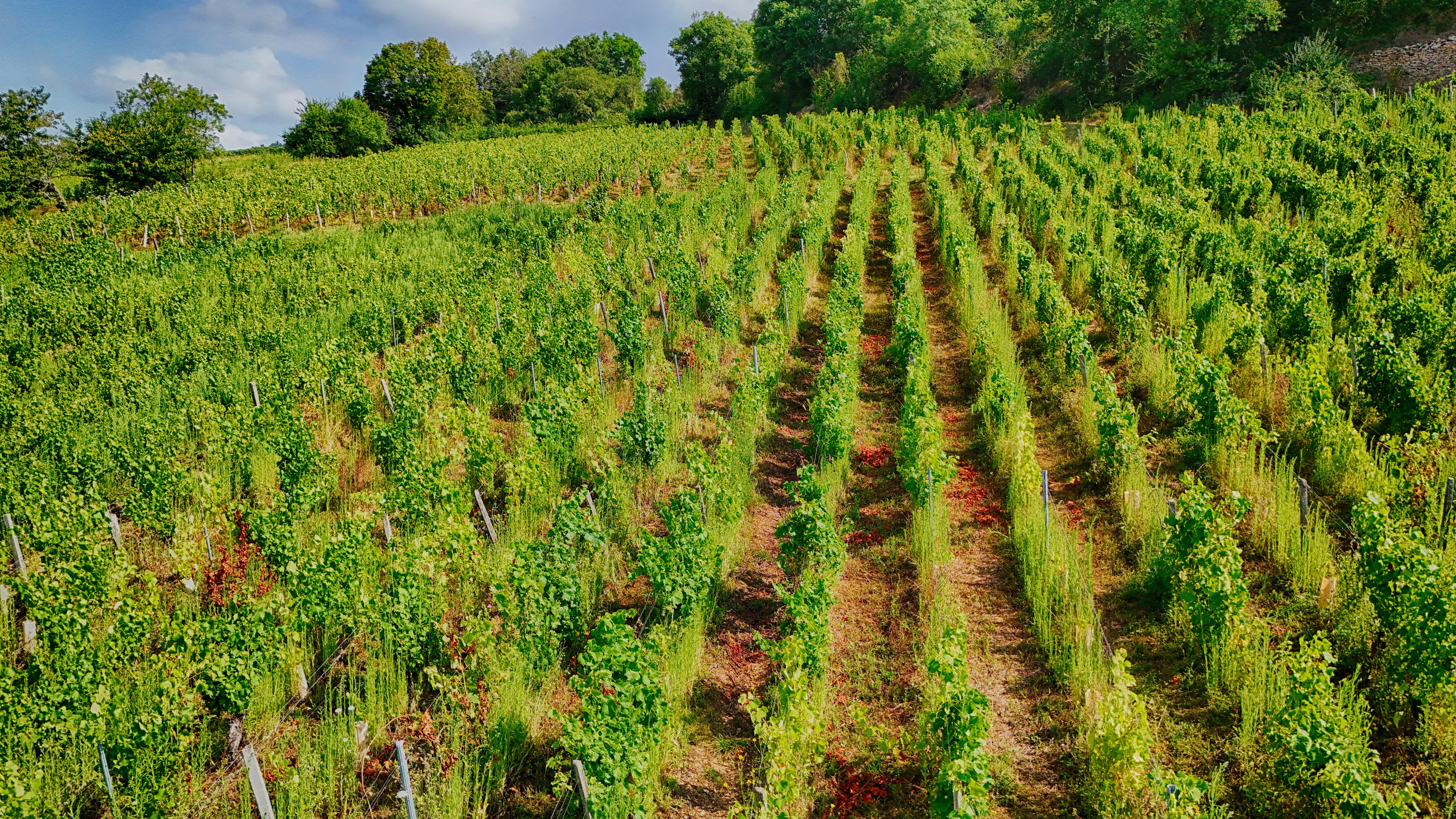
Vineyard rows in the Burgundy wine region

Monks and monasteries of the Roman Catholic Church have had an important influence on the history of Burgundy wine. The first known donation of a vineyard to the Church was by King Guntram in 587, but the influence of the Church became important in Charlemagne's era. The Benedictines, through their Abbey of Cluny founded in 910, became the first truly big Burgundy vineyard owner over the following centuries. Another order which exerted influence was the Cistercians, founded in 1098 and named after Cîteaux, their first monastery, situated in Burgundy. The Cistercians created Burgundy's largest wall-surrounded vineyard, the Clos de Vougeot, in 1336. More importantly, the Cistercians, extensive vineyard owners as they were, were the first to notice that different vineyard plots gave consistently different wines. They therefore laid the earliest foundation for the naming of Burgundy crus and the region's terroir thinking.

Since Burgundy is land-locked, very little of its wine left the region in medieval times, when wine was transported in barrels, meaning that waterways provided the only practical means of long-range transportation. The only part of Burgundy which could reach Paris in a practical way was the area around Auxerre by means of the Yonne. This area includes Chablis, but had much more extensive vineyards until the 19th century. These were the wines referred to as vin de Bourgogne in early texts. The wines from Côte d'Or would then be called (vin de) Beaune. These wines first became famous in the 14th century, during the Babylonian Captivity of the Papacy in Avignon, which was reachable by Saône and Rhône after some overland transport. In the extravagance of the papal court, Beaune was generally seen as the finest wine, and better than anything available in Rome at that time.

The status of Burgundy wines continued in the court of the House of Valois, which ruled as Dukes of Burgundy for much of the 14th and 15th centuries. Their ban on the import and export of non-Burgundian wines, effectively shutting out the then popular wines of the Rhone Valley from Northern European markets, gave a considerable boost to the Burgundy wine industry. It was during this era that the first reliable references to grape varieties in Burgundy were made. Pinot noir was first mentioned in 1370 under the name Noirien, but it was believed to have been cultivated earlier than that, since no other grape variety associated with medieval Burgundy is believed to have been able to produce red wines of a quality able to impress the papal court. On 6 August 1395, Duke Philip the Bold issued a decree concerned with safeguarding the quality of Burgundy wines. The duke declared the "vile and disloyal Gamay"—which was a higher-yielding grape than Pinot noir in the 14th century, as it is today—unfit for human consumption and banned the use of organic fertilizer (manure), which probably increased yields even further to the detriment of quality. High-quality white Burgundy wines of this era were probably made from Fromenteau, which is known as a quality grape in northeastern France in this time. Fromenteau is probably the same variety as today's Pinot gris. Chardonnay is a much later addition to Burgundy's vineyards.

In the 18th century, the quality of roads in France became progressively better, which facilitated commerce in Burgundy wines. The first négociant houses of the region were established in the 1720s and 1730s. In the 18th century, Burgundy and Champagne were rivals for the lucrative Paris market, to which Champagne had earlier access. The two regions overlapped much in wine styles in this era, since Champagne was then primarily a producer of pale red still wines rather than of sparkling wines. A major work on Burgundy wines written by Claude Arnoux in 1728 deals with the famous red wines of Côte de Nuits and the Œil-de-Perdrix pink wines of Volnay, but only briefly mentions white wines.

After Burgundy became incorporated in the Kingdom of France, and the power of the Church decreased, many vineyards which had been in the Church's hands were sold to the bourgeoisie from the 17th century. After the French Revolution of 1789, the Church's remaining vineyards were broken up and from 1791 sold off. The Napoleonic inheritance laws then resulted in the continued subdivision of the most precious vineyard holdings, so some growers hold only a row or two of vines. This led to the emergence of négociants who aggregate the produce of many growers to produce a single wine. It has also led to a profusion of increasingly smaller, family-owned wineries, exemplified by the dozen-plus Gros family domaines.

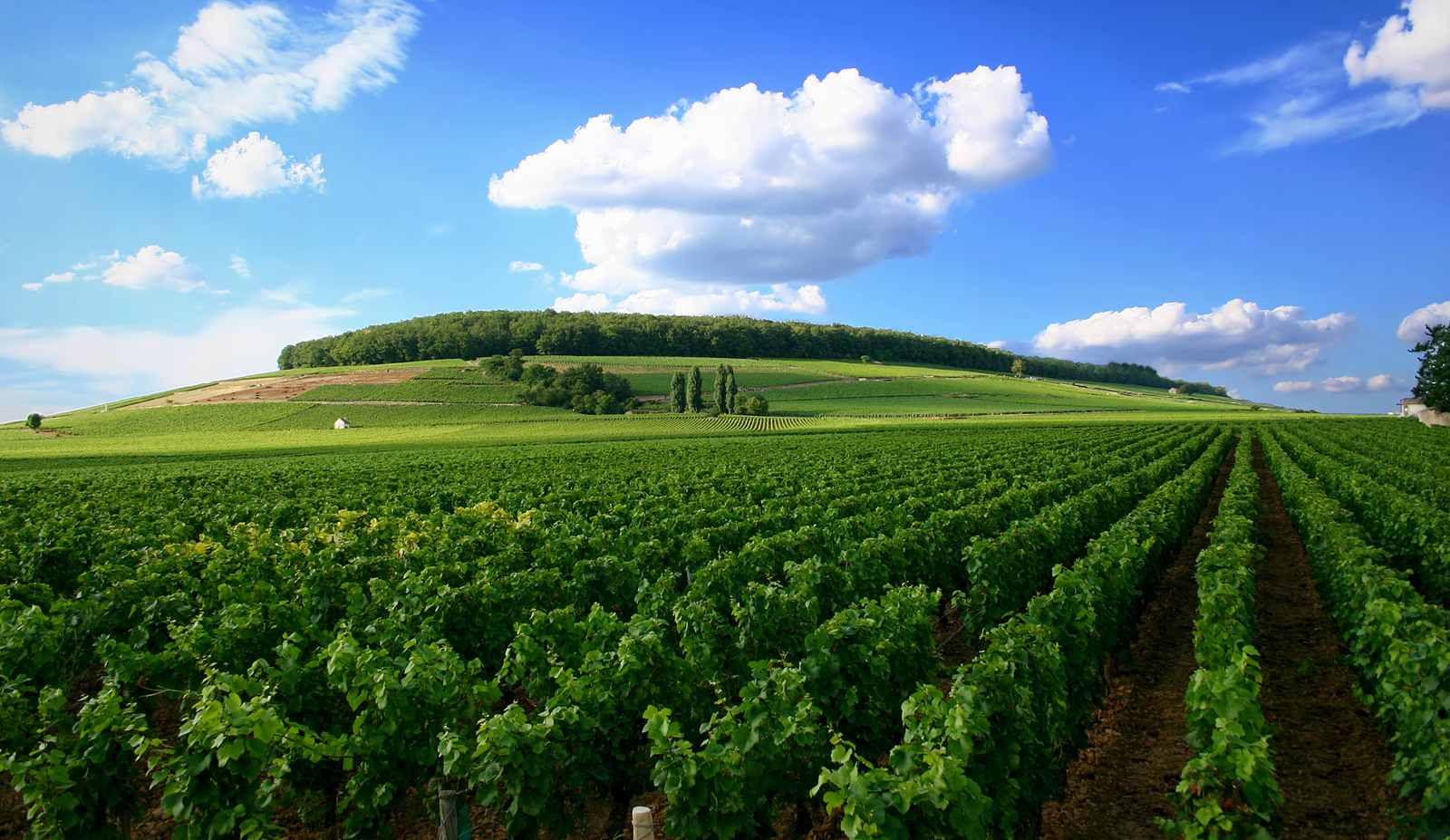
Vineyard in Côte de Beaune

The awareness of the difference of quality and style of Burgundy wines produced from different vineyards goes back to medieval times, with certain climats being more highly rated than others. An early author on this aspect of Burgundy wines was Denis Morelot with his La Vigne et le Vin en Côte d'Or from 1831. In 1855, the same year as the famous Bordeaux Wine Official Classification was launched, Dr. Jules Lavalle published an influential book, Histoire et Statistique de la Vigne de Grands Vins de la Côte-d'Or, which included an unofficial classification of the Burgundy vineyards in five classes and which built on Morelot's book. In decreasing order, Lavalle's five classes were hors ligne, tête de cuvée, 1^{ère} cuvée, 2^{me} cuvée and 3^{me} cuvée. Lavalle's classification was formalized in modified form by the Beaune Committee of Agriculture in 1861, and then consisted of three classes. Most of the "first class" vineyards of the 1861 classification were made into Grand Cru appellations d'origine contrôlées when the national AOC legislation was implemented in 1936.

Burgundy wine has experienced much change over the past 75 years. Economic depression during the 1930s was followed by the devastation caused by World War II. After the War, the vignerons returned home to their unkempt vineyards. The soils and vines had suffered and were sorely in need of nurturing. The growers began to fertilize, bringing their vineyards back to health. Those who could afford it added potassium, a mineral fertilizer that contributes to vigorous growth. By the mid-1950s, the soils were balanced, yields were reasonably low and the vineyards produced some of the most stunning wines in the 20th century.

For the next 30 years, they followed the advice of renowned viticultural experts, who advised them to keep spraying their vineyards with chemical fertilizers, including potassium. While a certain amount of potassium is natural in the soil and beneficial for healthy growth, too much is harmful because it leads to low acidity levels, which adversely affect the quality of the wine.

As the concentration of chemicals in the soil increased, so did the yields. In the past 30 years, yields have risen by two-thirds in the appellations contrôlées vineyards of the Côte d'Or, from 29 hectoliters per hectare (hl/ha) (yearly average from 1951 to 1960) to almost 48 hl/ha (1982–91), according to a study by the Institut National des Appellations d'Origine. With higher yields came wines of less flavor and concentration. Within 30 years, the soils had been significantly depleted of their natural nutrients.

The period between 1985 and 1995 was a turning point in Burgundy. During this time, many Burgundian domaines renewed efforts in the vineyards and gradually set a new course in winemaking, producing deeper, more complex wines. Today, the Burgundy wine industry is reaping the rewards of those efforts.

== Wine characteristics and classification ==
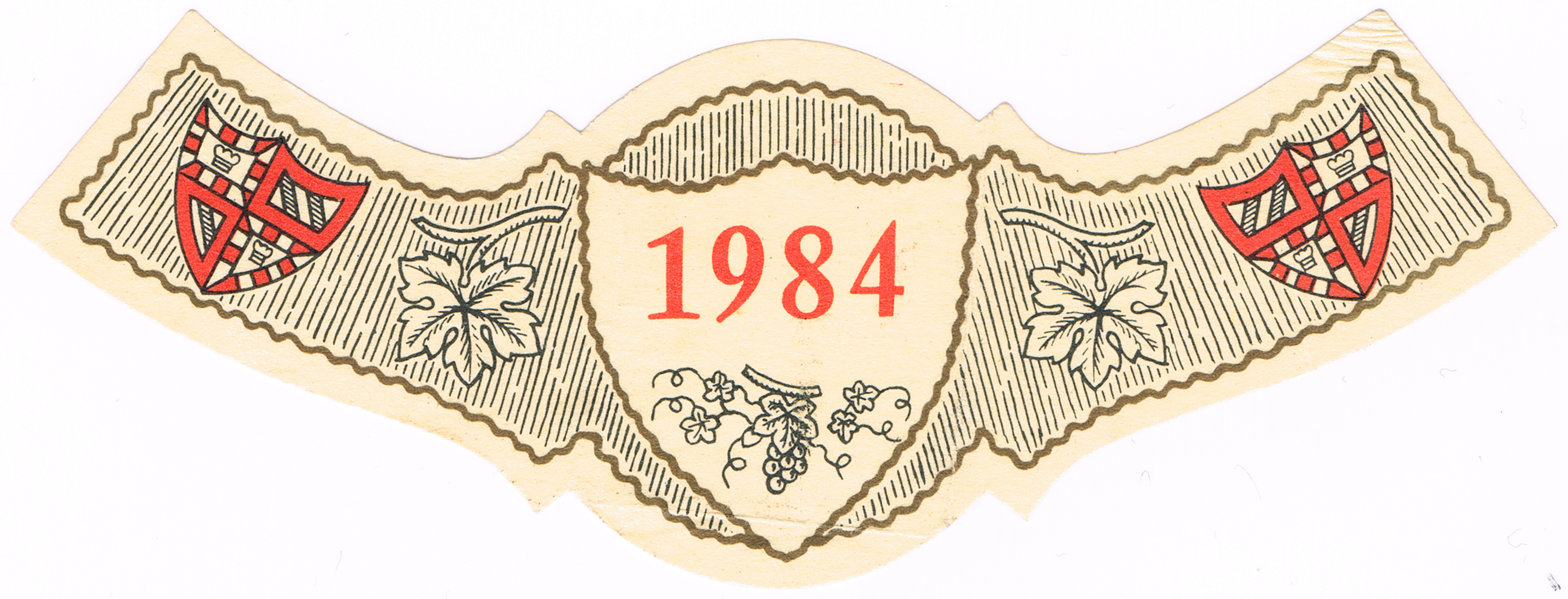
A label used on a 1984 bottle's neck, showing the Burgundy coat of arms

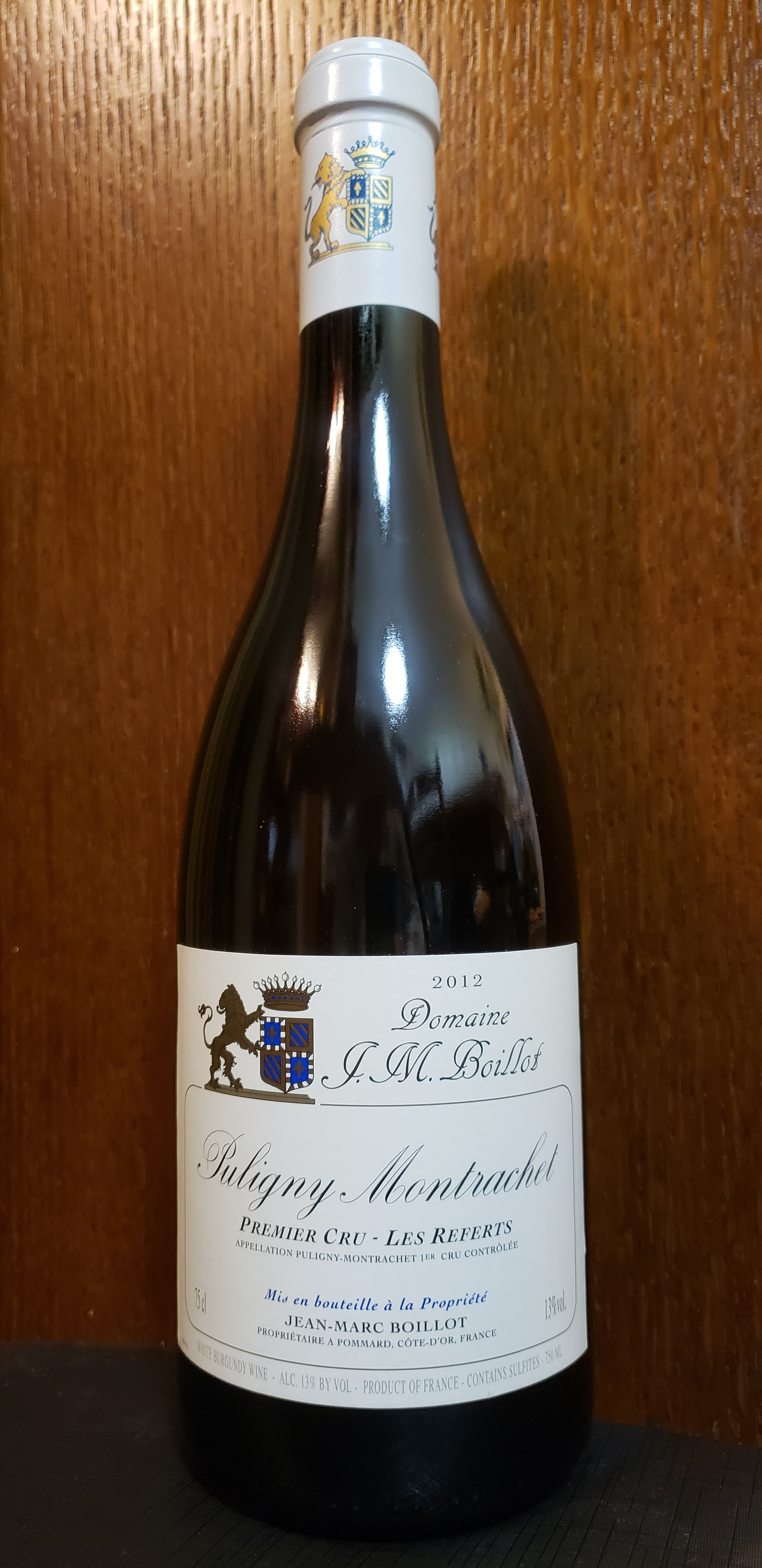
Premier Cru from Puligny-Montrachet

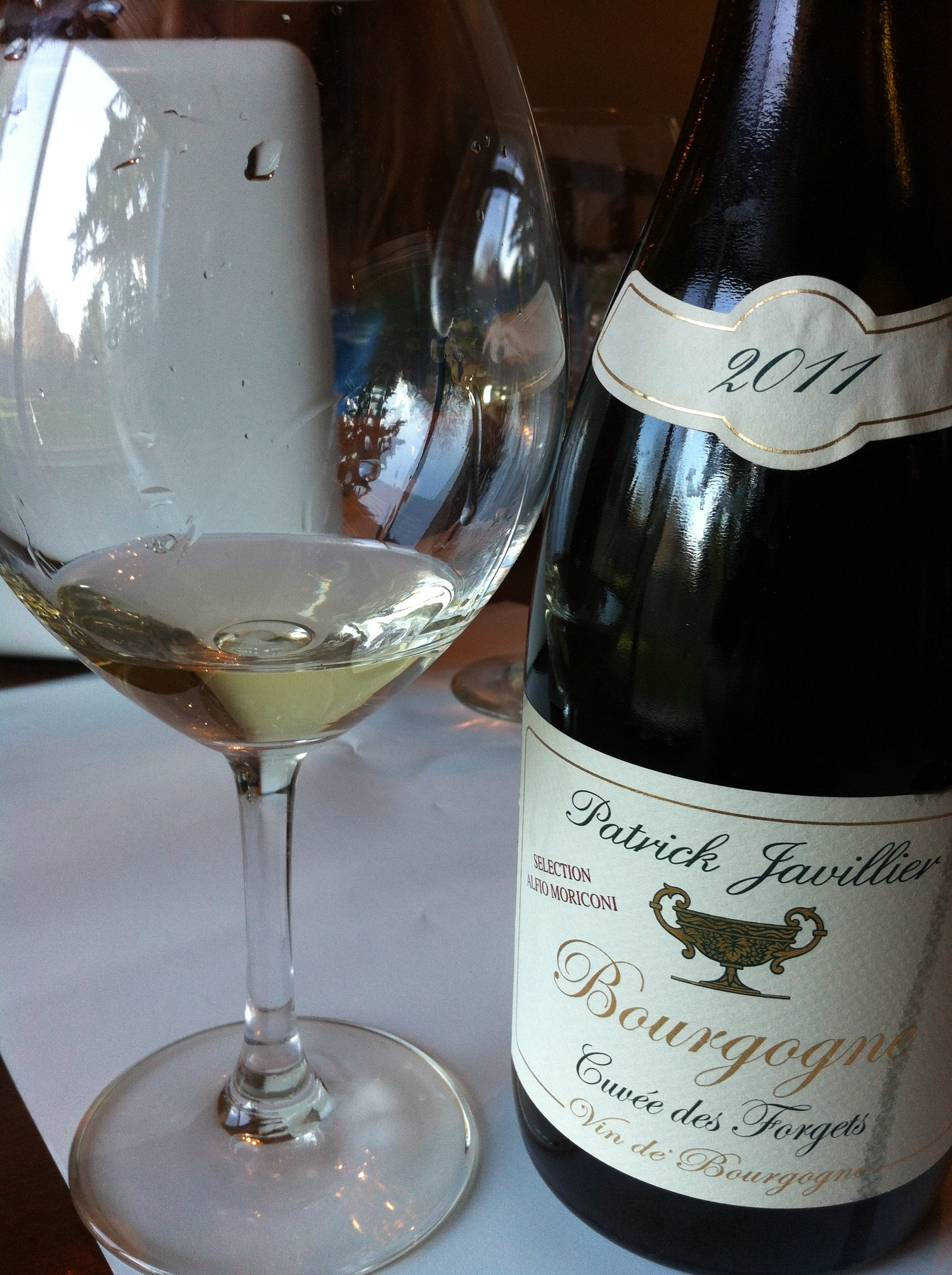
A white wine made from declassified AOC Meursault wine that is sold as a general AOC Bourgogne

Burgundy is in some ways the most terroir-oriented region in France; immense attention is paid to the area of origin, and in which of the region's 400 types of soil a wine's grapes are grown. As opposed to Bordeaux, where classifications are producer-driven and awarded to individual chateaux, Burgundy classifications are geographically focused. A specific vineyard or region will bear a given classification, regardless of the wine's producer. This focus is reflected on the wine's labels, where appellations are most prominent and producers' names often appear at the bottom in much smaller text.

The main levels in the Burgundy classifications, in descending order of quality, are: Grand crus, Premier crus, village appellations, and finally regional appellations:

- Grand Cru wines are produced by a small number of the best vineyard sites in the Côte d'Or region, as strictly defined by the AOC laws. These Cru wines make up 2% of the production at 35 hl/ha, and are generally produced in a style meant for cellaring, and typically need to be aged a minimum of five to seven years. The best examples can be kept for more than 15 years. Grand Cru wines will only list the name of the vineyard as the appellation - such as Corton or Montrachet - on the wine label, plus the Grand Cru term, but not the village name. Several Grand Cru vineyards have compound names (double-barrelled names), mostly due to adding a more famous vineyard which they neighbor, as in Charmes-Chambertin (adding Chambertin to "Charmes") or Romanée-Saint-Vivant (adding La Romanée to "Saint-Vivant"; these no longer quite neighbor), though other compound names such as Corton-Charlemagne have idiosyncratic histories. There are two triple names of this form: Bienvenues-Bâtard-Montrachet and Criots-Bâtard-Montrachet, corresponding to vineyards that neighbor Bâtard-Montrachet, which neighbors Montrachet. Compound names using a more famous vineyard are sometimes referred to as "satellites" of the more famous one.
- Premier Cru wines are produced from specific vineyard sites that are still considered to be of high quality, but not as well regarded as the Grand Cru sites. Premier Cru wines make up 12% of production at 45 hl/ha. These wines often should be aged three to five years, and again the best wines can keep for much longer. Premier Cru wines are labelled with the name of the village of origin, the Premier Cru status, and usually the vineyard name, for example, "Volnay 1er Cru Les Caillerets". Some Premier Cru wines are produced from several Premier Cru vineyards in the same village, and do not carry the name of an individual vineyard. Blending premier crus is more common in Morey-Saint-Denis than other villages.
- Village appellation wines are produced from a blend of wines from supposedly lesser vineyard sites within the boundaries of one of 42 villages, or from one individual but unclassified vineyard. Wines from each different village are considered to have their own specific qualities and characteristics, and not all Burgundy communes have a village appellation. Village wines make up 36% of production at 50 hl/ha. These wines can be consumed two to four years after the release date, although again some examples will keep for longer. Village wines will show the village name on the wine label, such as "Pommard", and sometimes - if applicable - the name of the single vineyard or climat where it was sourced. Several villages in Burgundy have appended the names of their most famous Grand Cru vineyards to the original village name, for marketing reasons, resulting in double-barrelled names, starting with "Gevrey-Chambertin" in 1847 and ending with "Morey-Saint-Denis" in 1927.
- Regional appellation wines are wines which are allowed to be produced over the entire region, or over an area significantly larger than that of an individual village. At the village, Premier Cru and Grand Cru levels, only red and white wines are found, but some of the regional appellations also allow the production of rosé and sparkling wines, as well as wines dominated by grape varieties other than Pinot noir or Chardonnay. These appellations can be divided into three groups:

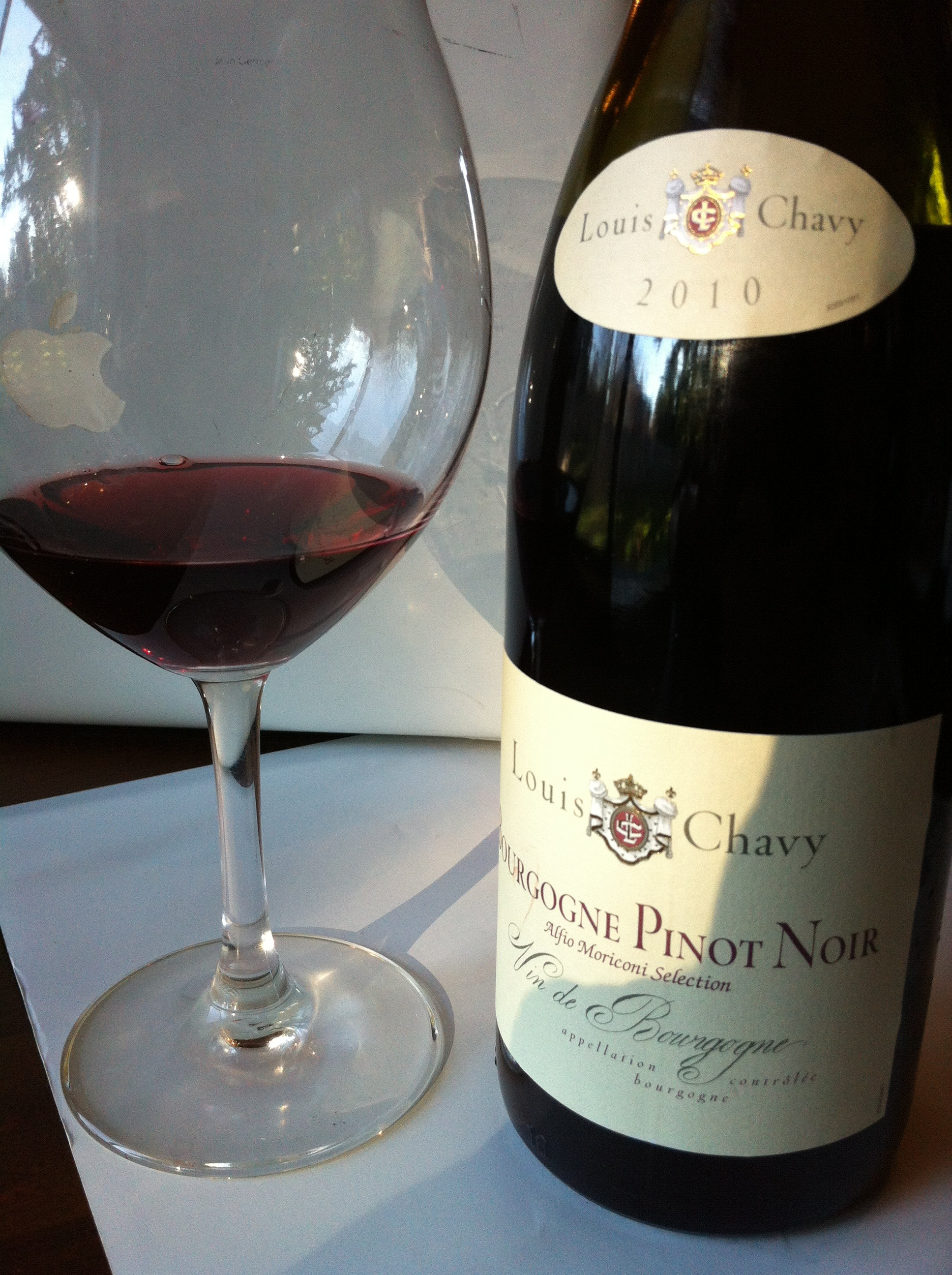
An AOC Bourgogne Pinot noir

- AOC Bourgogne, the standard or "generic" appellation for red or white wines made anywhere throughout the region, and represent simpler wines which are still similar to the village. These wines may be produced at 55 hl/ha. These wines are typically intended for immediate consumption, within three years after the vintage date.
- Subregional (sous-régional) appellations cover a part of Burgundy larger than a village. Examples are Bourgogne Hautes-Côtes de Beaune, Bourgogne Hautes-Côtes de Nuits and Mâcon-Villages. Typically, those communes which do not have a village appellation will have access to at least one subregional appellation. This level is sometimes described as intermediate between AOC Bourgogne and the village level.
- Wines of specific styles or other grape varieties include white Bourgogne Aligoté (which is primarily made with the Aligoté grape), red Bourgogne Passe-Tout-Grains (which can contain up to two-thirds Gamay) and sparkling Crémant de Bourgogne.

Chablis wines are labeled using a similar hierarchy of Grand Cru, Premier Cru, and Village wines, plus Petit Chablis as a level below Village Chablis. Wines from Beaujolais are treated still differently.

In general, producers are always allowed to declassify their wine in steps to a lower-ranked AOC if they wish to do so. Thus, a wine from a Grand Cru vineyard may be sold as a Premier Cru from that vineyard's village, a Premier Cru wine may be sold as a Village wine, and so on. This practice will almost invariably mean the declassified wine will have to be sold at a lower price, so this is only practiced when something is to be gained overall in the process. One motive may be to only include vines of a certain age in a Grand Cru wine, to improve its quality and raise its prestige and price, in which case the wine coming from younger vines may be sold as a Premier Cru at a lower price. Overall, such a practice may allow a producer to keep a higher average price for the wine sold.

In total, around 150 separate AOCs are used in Burgundy, including those of Chablis and Beaujolais. While an impressive number, it does not include the several hundred named vineyards (lieux-dits) at the Village and Premier Cru level, which may be displayed on the label, since at these levels, only one set of appellation rules is available per village. The total number of vineyard-differentiated AOCs that may be displayed is well in excess of 500.

== Production ==
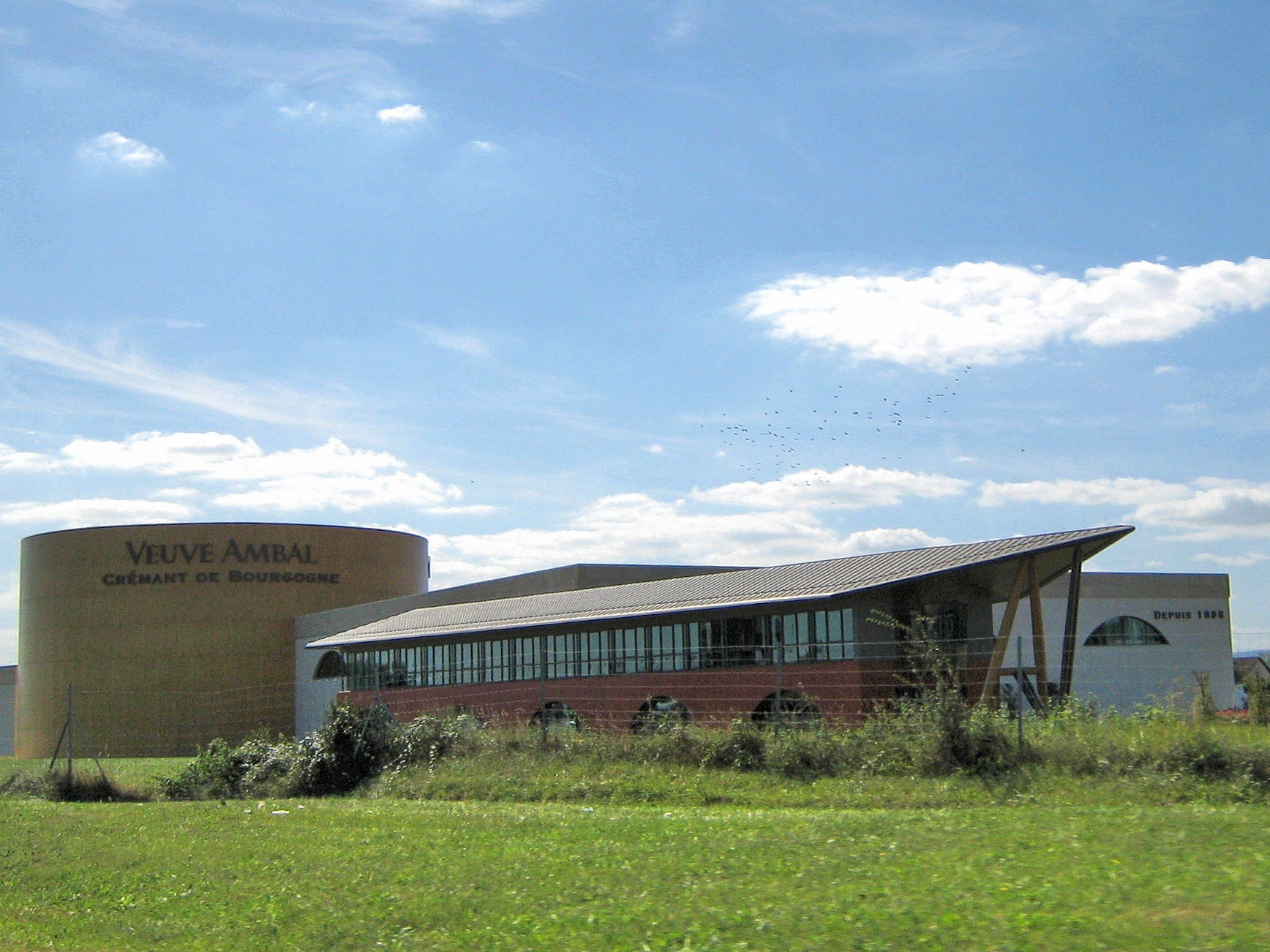
One of the main wineries that produces Crémant de Bourgogne

In 2003, the Burgundy vineyards (including Chablis but excluding Beaujolais) covered a total of 28,530 hectares (70,500 acres). Côte d'Or as a whole, including Hautes Côtes de Beaune and Hautes Côtes de Nuits, covered 8,000 hectares (20,000 acres), of which the heartland of Côte de Nuits covered 1,700 hectares (4,200 acres) and Côte de Beaune 3,600 hectares (8,900 acres).

In 2000, Burgundy had a total of 3,200 wine domaines (compared to 50 in the early 19th century), of which 520 were in the department of Yonne, 1,100 in Côte-d'Or and 1,570 in Saône-et-Loir. Generally, the small growers sell their grapes to larger producers, merchants called négociants, who blend and bottle the wine. The roughly 115 négociants who produce the majority of the wine only control around 8% of the area. Individual growers have around 67% of the area, but produce and market only around 25% of the wine. Some small wineries produce only 100–200 cases/year, while many producers make a few thousand cases/year.

Grower/producer-made wines can be identified by the terms Mis en bouteille au domaine, Mis au domaine, or Mis en bouteille à la propriété. The largest producer is Maison Louis Latour in Beaune with 350,000 cases/year. The négociants may use the term Mis en bouteille dans nos caves (bottled in our cellars), but are not entitled to use the estate-bottled designation of the grower/producers. Most négociants tend to use the term Mis en bouteille par... (bottled by...).

== Grape varieties ==
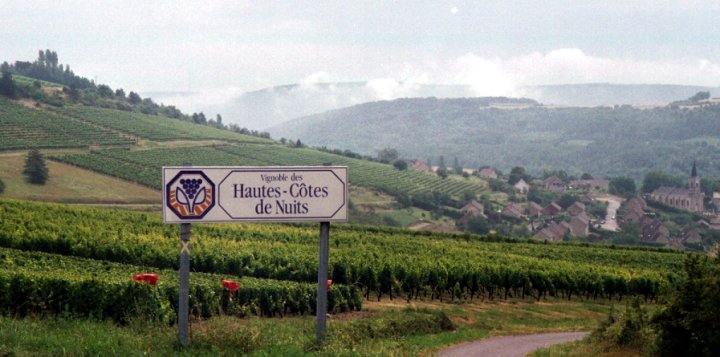
Burgundy vineyards: The Hautes-Côtes de Nuits

Of the white grapes, Chardonnay is the most common. Another grape found in the region, Aligoté, tends to produce cheaper wines which are higher in acidity. Aligoté from Burgundy is the wine traditionally used for the Kir drink, where it is mixed with black currant liqueur. Sauvignon blanc is also grown in the Saint Bris appellation. Chablis, Mâcon wines and the Côte d'Or whites are mostly produced from 100% Chardonnay grapes.

Of the red grapes, the majority of production in the Côte d'Or is focused on the Pinot noir grape, while the Gamay grape is grown in Beaujolais. In the Côte de Nuits region, 90% of the production is red grapes.

Rules for the red Burgundy appellations, from regional to Grand Cru level, generally allow up to 15% of the white grape varieties Chardonnay, Pinot blanc and Pinot gris to be blended in, but this is not widely practised today.

== Reputation and appreciation ==
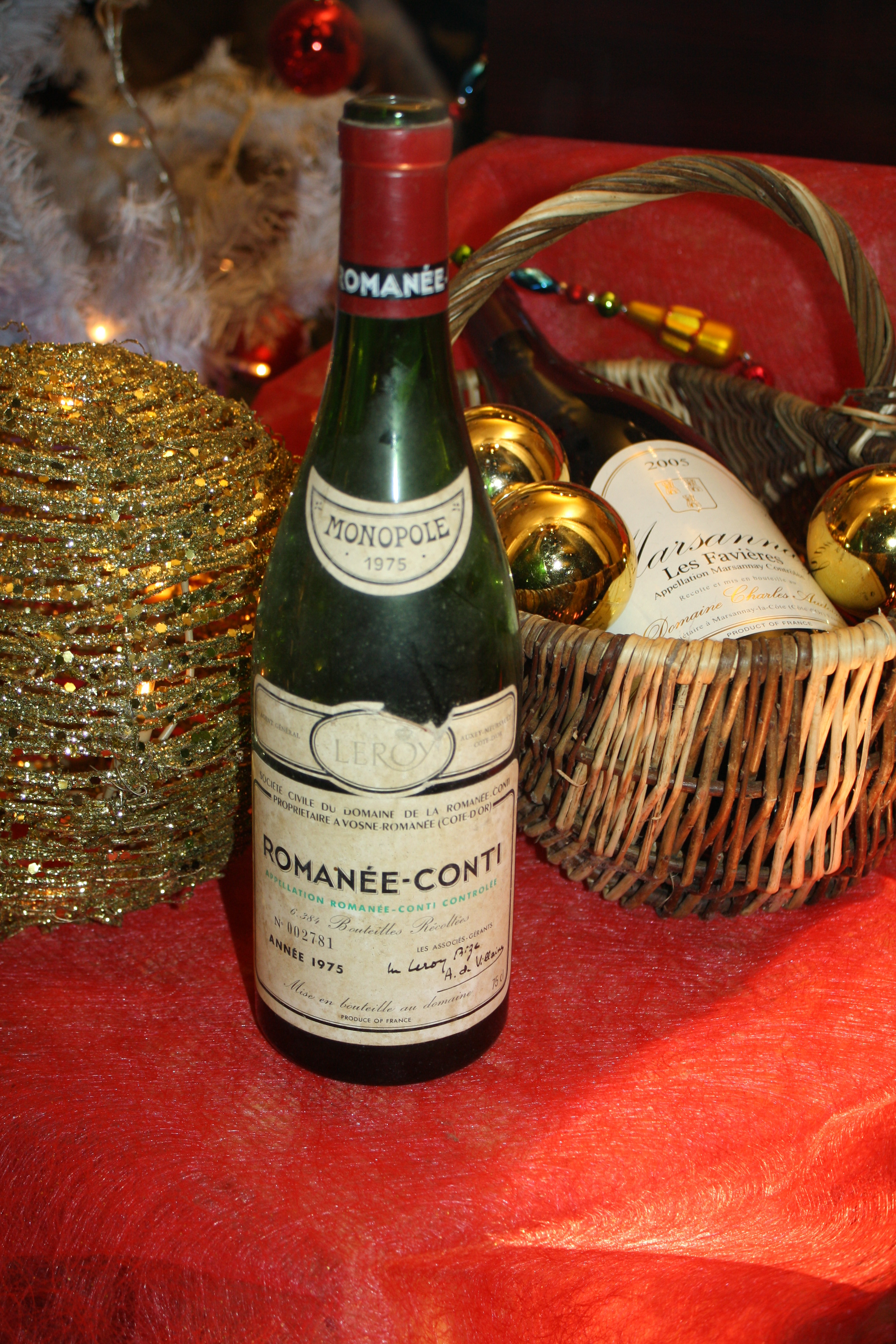
Romanée-Conti, a Burgundy wine, is among the world's most expensive wines.

Burgundy is home to some of the most expensive wines in the world, including those of Domaine de la Romanée-Conti, Domaine Leroy, Henri Jayer, Domaine Leflaive and Domaine Armand Rousseau.

Its renown goes back many centuries; in 1522 Erasmus wrote: "O happy Burgundy which merits being called the mother of men since she furnishes from her mammaries such a good milk" This was echoed by Shakespeare, who refers in King Lear to "the vines of France and milk of Burgundy".

British wine critic Jancis Robinson has stated that "price is an extremely unreliable guide" and "what a wine sells for often has more to do with advertising hype and marketing decisions than the quality contained in the bottle". While Grand Crus often command steep prices, village level wines from top producers can be found at lower price points.

In 2010, the Burgundy region experienced a notable increase in internet coverage thanks to official efforts like the online broadcast of the famous Hospices de Beaune, as well as the efforts of independent wine aficionados, such as Bourgogne Live. Some burgundies are also increasingly valued as investment wines.

Fans of Burgundy wine have been organizing events celebrating its virtues for decades. The most famous of these is La Paulée de Meursault.

== See also ==
- Bordeaux wine
- Confrérie des Chevaliers du Tastevin
- French wine
- List of Burgundy Grand Crus
- List of Chablis crus
- Premature oxidation
