= Canton of Chalamont =

Coordinates: 45°59′47″N 5°10′19″E

Chalamont
- Former canton
- Interactive map of Chalamont
- Country: France
- Region: Auvergne-Rhône-Alpes
- Department: Ain
- No. of communes: {{{nbcomm}}}
- Disbanded: 2015
- Area: 158.14 km^{2} (61.06 sq mi)
- Population (2012): 7,033
  - Density: 44.47/km^{2} (115.2/sq mi)

The canton of Chalamont is a former administrative division in eastern France. It was disbanded following the French canton reorganisation which came into effect in March 2015. It consisted of 8 communes, which joined the canton of Ceyzériat in 2015. It had 7,033 inhabitants (2012).

The canton comprised 8 communes:

- Chalamont
- Châtenay
- Châtillon-la-Palud
- Crans
- Le Plantay
- Saint-Nizier-le-Désert
- Versailleux
- Villette-sur-Ain

== Demographics ==
Historical population Canton of Chalamont
Year	1962	1968	1975	1982	1990	1999
Pop.	3,112	3,374	3,421	3,960	4,294	4,931
±%	—	+8.4%	+1.4%	+15.8%	+8.4%	+14.8%
From the year 1962 on: No double counting – residents of multiple communes (e.g. students and military personnel) are counted only once. Source: INSEE

== See also ==
- Cantons of the Ain department
- Communes of France
