= Abbey of Notre-Dame des Dombes =

Former Trappist monastery in Ain, France

- Abbaye Notre-Dame-des-Dombes
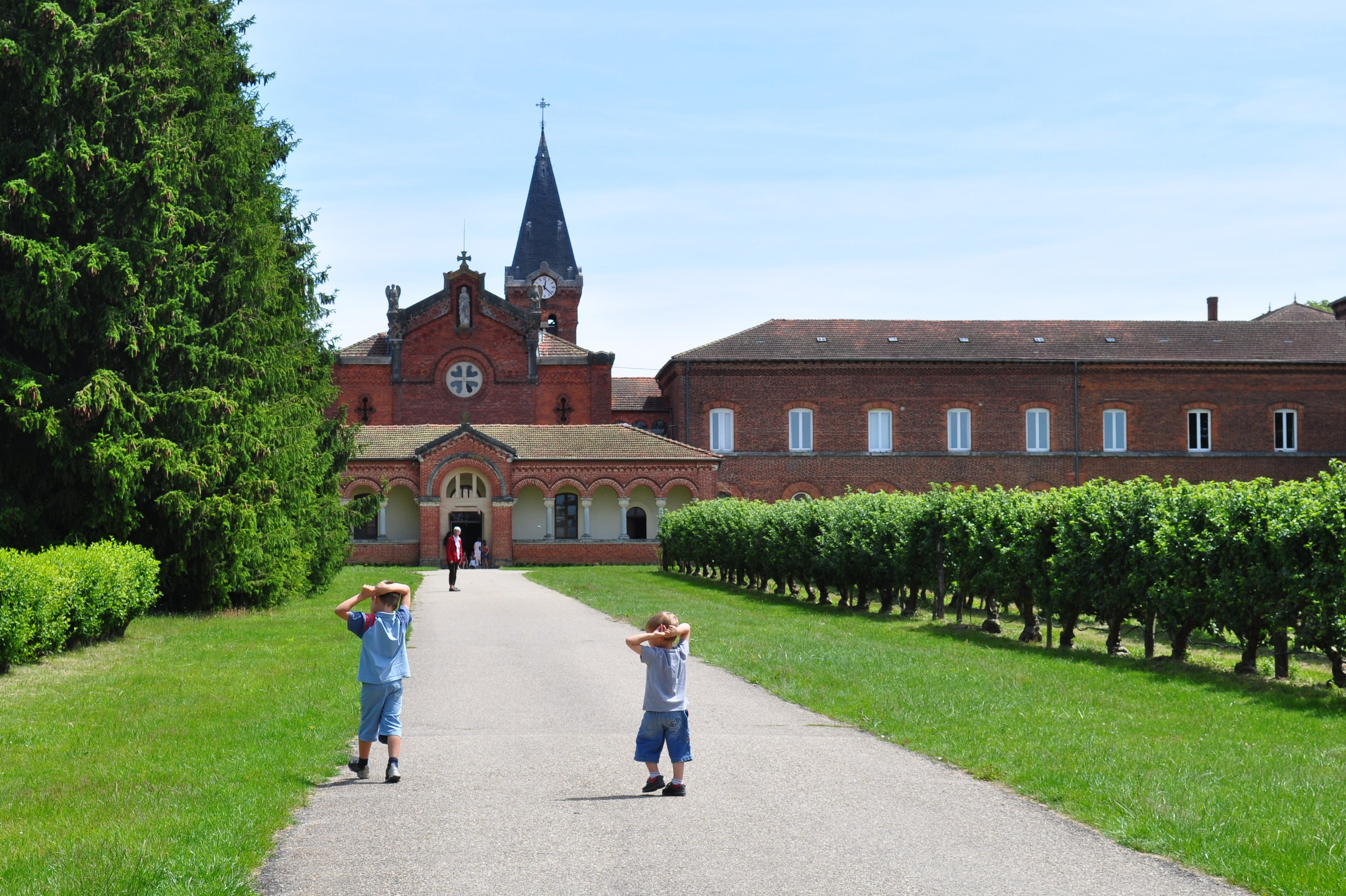
- The main entrance of the abbey

- Location in France
- Interactive map of Abbey of Notre-Dame des Dombes

Monastery information
- Order: Trappist (formerly)
- Established: 1863
- Disestablished: 2001
- Diocese: Roman Catholic Diocese of Belley–Ars

Site
- Location: Le Plantay, Ain, France
- Coordinates: 46.0380°N 5.0963°E

The Abbey of Notre-Dame des Dombes (French: Abbaye Notre-Dame-des-Dombes) is a former Trappist monastery located in Le Plantay in the Dombes region, in the Ain department of eastern France. It is now occupied by members of the Chemin Neuf movement.

== History ==
The monastery was established by 44 monks from Aiguebelle Abbey in 1863, on the invitation of Mgr Pierre-Henri Gérault de Langalerie, bishop of Belley, with the aim not only of evangelizing the country, but also of draining the swamps of the Dombes, so as to improve agriculture and fishing and raise the standard of living of the inhabitants.

The importance of the abbey grew quickly, and it was successful in its intended purposes.

In 1937 Paul Couturier launched the Dombes Group (Groupe des Dombes), a francophone ecumenical group consisting of equal numbers of Roman Catholic and Protestant theologians, which met between 1968 and 1997 in the abbey.

During World War II the monks worked with the Resistance and helped many people, especially Jews. There were many visits by the Gestapo; on 2 May 1944 two monks were executed, and others arrested. For the community's actions the abbey was awarded in 1946 the Legion of Honour.

In 2001, there were very few monks remaining, who asked the Chemin Neuf Community to come and replace them in their mission of prayer and welcoming visitors.
