= Doane Stuart School =

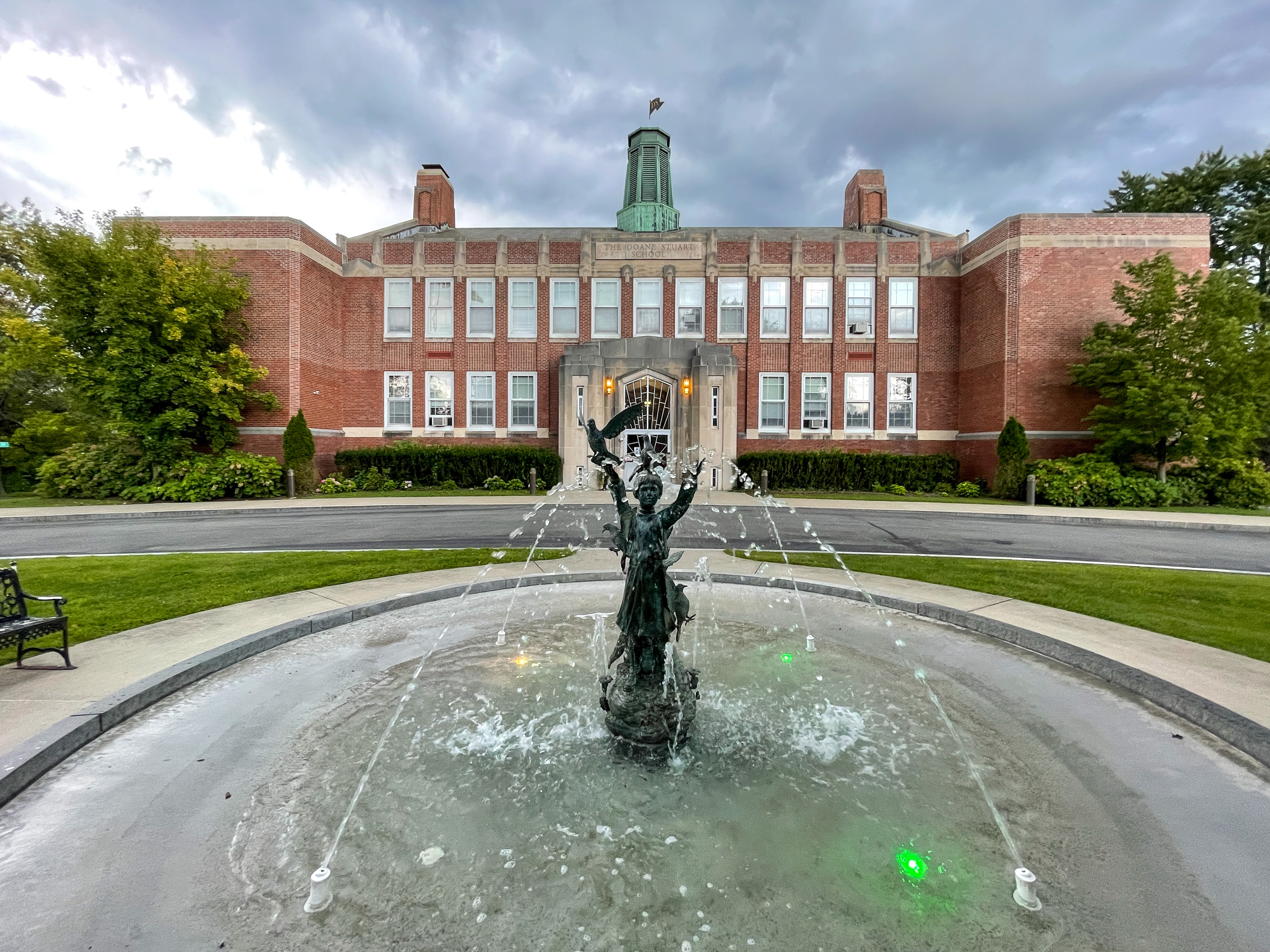
- Rensselaer, New York; United States

Information
- Type: Independent school, private school, co-educational
- Religious affiliation: Interfaith
- Established: 1852 (as Kenwood Academy)
- Closed: 2026
- Head teacher: Marcy Cathey
- Grades: Prekindergarten through Grade 12.
- Student to teacher ratio: 8:1
- Campus: 24 acres (97,000 m^{2})
- Colors: Blue & green
- Mascot: Thunderchicken
- Website: www.doanestuart.org
- The Doane Stuart School (formerly Van Rensselaer High School)
- U.S. National Register of Historic Places
- Location within New York Location within the United States
- Location: 199 Washington Ave., Rensselaer, New York
- Coordinates: 42°39′32″N 73°43′37″W
- Area: 24.53 acres (9.93 ha)
- Built: 1930-1931, 1938-1939
- Architect: Clarence H. Gardinier, Howard O. Fullerton
- Architectural style: Art Deco
- NRHP reference No.: 12000511
- Added to NRHP: August 14, 2012

The Doane Stuart School was a private college preparatory school in Rensselaer, New York. The school was coeducational and interfaith, and it educated students in prekindergarten through Grade 12.

== History ==
The Doane Stuart School ("Doane Stuart") was founded in 1975 as the result of a merger between the Roman Catholic Kenwood Academy (founded by the Society of the Sacred Heart in 1852) and the Episcopal St. Agnes School (founded in 1870). The name "Doane Stuart" was chosen to honor the first Episcopal Bishop of Albany, the Right Reverend William Croswell Doane, and Roman Catholic educator Janet Erskine Stuart. Doane Stuart's first home was the campus of the old Kenwood Academy in Albany, New York.

Doane Stuart was established as an ecumenical Christian school, but later became an interfaith school. In 2007, the School offered to purchase the former Kenwood Academy from the Society of the Sacred Heart for $7.2 million. The Society rejected the offer. In March 2008, the Board of Trustees of Doane Stuart announced it had decided to end its affiliation with the Network of Sacred Heart Schools due to religious differences. At about the same time, the Society of the Sacred Heart notified the school it would not renew its lease of the former Kenwood Academy. On May 20, 2008, Rensselaer, New York voters approved the proposed sale of the former Van Rensselaer High School to Doane Stuart; Doane Stuart purchased the building for $4 million in September 2008. After a year-long renovation and restoration effort, Doane Stuart opened on September 16, 2009 at its new Rensselaer location.

The Doane Stuart School building in Rensselaer, New York was listed on the National Register of Historic Places in 2012. As of April 2016, the School's 22,000-square-foot "green roof" was reportedly the largest vegetative roof in the Capital District. The school is co-educational and college preparatory. It educates students from early childhood through Grade 12.

On March 23, 2023, the former Doane Stuart School building in Albany was destroyed by a massive fire. Speaking about the fire, Albany Mayor Kathy Sheehan said, "'We lost a treasure here and it’s challenging, it’s frustrating'".

Doane Stuart celebrated its 50th anniversary in 2025.

In June 2026, the school announced it would close, citing low enrollment.

== Exchange program ==
The School hosts an Irish American Exchange program, begun in 2003, which brings together Protestant and Catholic students from Lagan College (a secondary school in Belfast, Northern Ireland) to spend a year at Doane Stuart and live with local families. According to the Albany Times Union, as of 2014, 22 exchange students from Lagan College had spent a school year studying at Doane Stuart, while approximately 100 Doane Stuart students had made one-week visits to Lagan College.

== Notable alumni ==
- Paul Carey - White House Special Assistant to U.S. President Bill Clinton and 77th Commissioner of the Securities and Exchange Commission.
- Leila Herbert (St. Agnes School) - author
- Joan Vollmer (St. Agnes School) - prominent female member of the early Beat Generation circle.
- Lurana White (St. Agnes School), co-founder of the Society of the Atonement
- Alice Morgan Wright (St. Agnes School) - American sculptor, suffragist, and animal welfare activist. She was one of the first American artists to embrace Cubism and Futurism.
- David Yezzi - American poet, editor, actor, and professor at Johns Hopkins University.
