= Saint-Martin-du-Mont, Ain =

Commune in Auvergne-Rhône-Alpes, France

Saint-Martin-du-Mont
- Commune
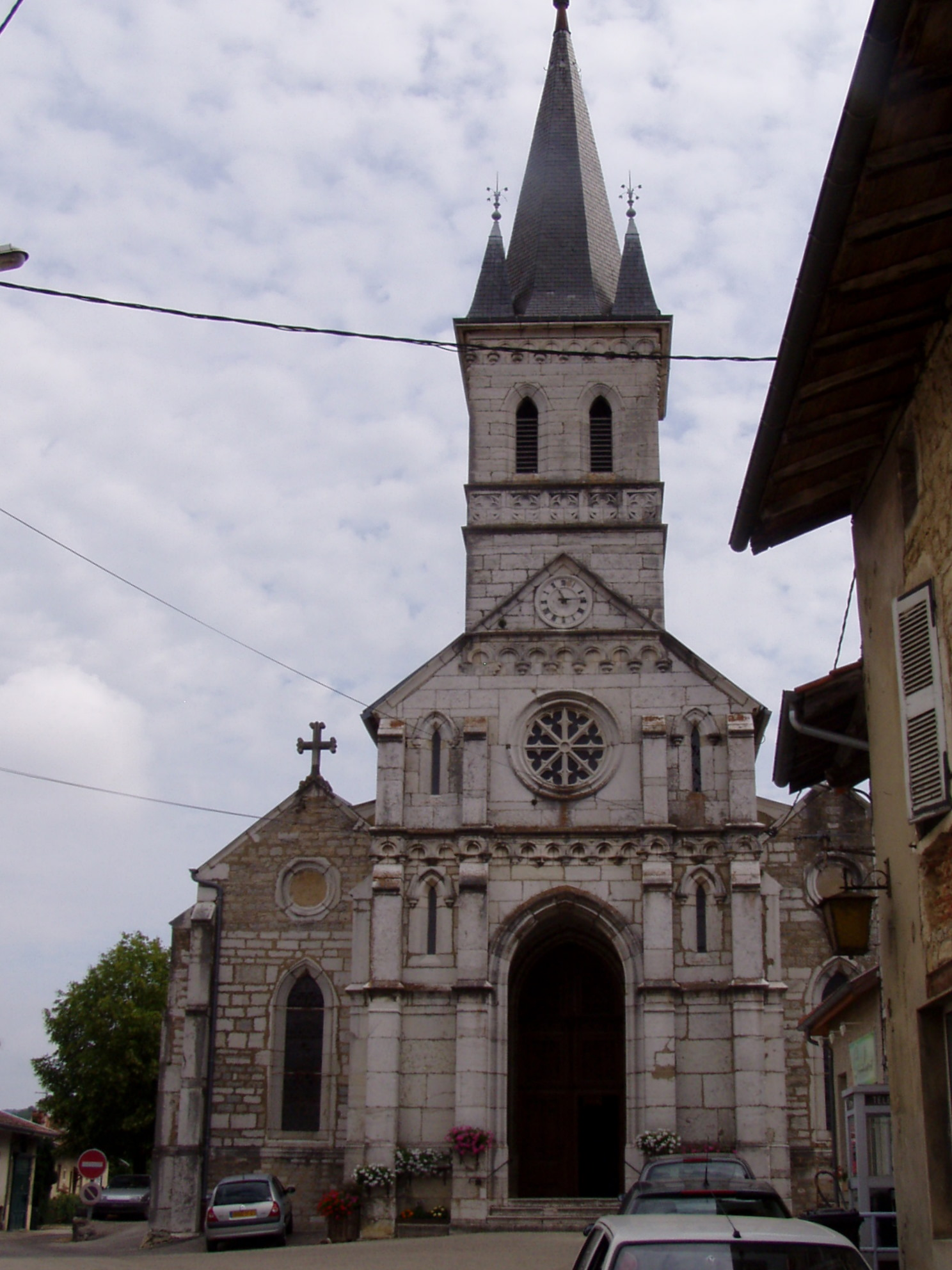
- Location of Saint-Martin-du-Mont
- Location within France Location within Auvergne-Rhône-Alpes
- Coordinates: 46°06′08″N 5°19′45″E
- Country: France
- Region: Auvergne-Rhône-Alpes
- Department: Ain
- Arrondissement: Bourg-en-Bresse
- Canton: Ceyzériat
- Intercommunality: CA Bassin de Bourg-en-Bresse

Government
  - Mayor (2026–32): Françoise Legouge
- Area^{1}: 28.09 km^{2} (10.85 sq mi)
- Elevation: 340 m (1,120 ft)
- Highest elevation: 556 m (1,824 ft)
- Lowest elevation: 246 m (807 ft)
- Population (2023): 2,023
  - Density: 72.02/km^{2} (186.5/sq mi)
- Time zone: UTC+01:00 (CET)
  - Summer (DST): UTC+02:00 (CEST)
- INSEE/Postal code: 01374 /01160
- ^{1} French Land Register data, which excludes lakes, ponds, glaciers > 1 km^{2} (0.386 sq mi or 247 acres) and river estuaries.

Saint-Martin-du-Mont (French pronunciation: [sɛ̃ maʁtɛ̃ dy mɔ̃]) is a commune in the Ain department in the region of Auvergne-Rhône-Alpes in eastern France.

== Population ==
Historical population
Year	Pop.	±% p.a.
1968	1,007	—
1975	909	−1.45%
1982	1,078	+2.47%
1990	1,179	+1.13%
1999	1,302	+1.11%
2007	1,535	+2.08%
2012	1,699	+2.05%
2017	1,826	+1.45%
2023	2,023	+1.72%
Source: INSEE

== See also ==
- Communes of the Ain department
