= Hilary A. Herbert =

American politician (1834–1919)

Hilary Herbert
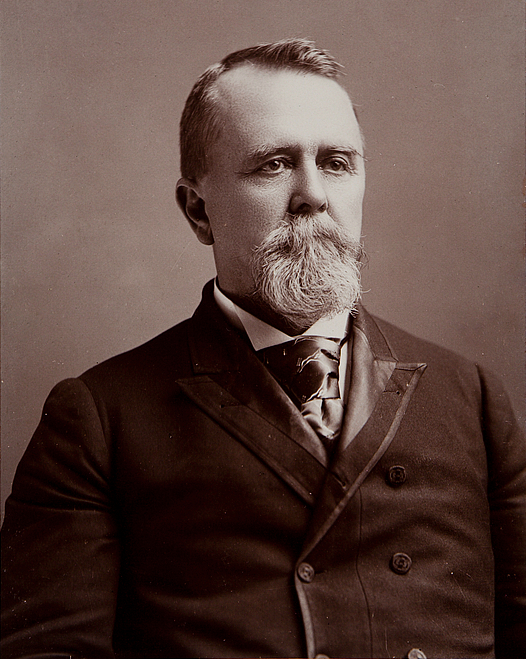

33rd United States Secretary of the Navy
- In office March 7, 1893 – March 4, 1897
- President: Grover Cleveland
- Preceded by: Benjamin F. Tracy
- Succeeded by: John Long

Member of the U.S. House of Representatives from Alabama's 2nd district
- In office March 4, 1877 – March 3, 1893
- Preceded by: Jeremiah Norman Williams
- Succeeded by: Jesse F. Stallings

Personal details
- Born: Hilary Abner Herbert; March 12, 1834 Laurens, South Carolina, U.S.
- Died: March 6, 1919 (aged 84) Tampa, Florida, U.S.
- Party: Democratic
- Children: Leila Herbert
- Education: University of Alabama, Tuscaloosa; University of Virginia, Charlottesville

Military service
- Allegiance: Confederate States
- Branch/service: Confederate States Army
- Rank: Colonel
- Commands: 8th Regiment Alabama Infantry
- Battles/wars: American Civil War; Battle of the Wilderness

Hilary Abner Herbert (March 12, 1834 – March 6, 1919) was Secretary of the Navy in the second administration of President Grover Cleveland. He also served as a member of the United States House of Representatives from Alabama.

== Biography ==
Herbert was born in Laurensville, South Carolina in 1834, and moved with his family to Greenville, Alabama in 1846. He was educated at the University of Alabama and the University of Virginia, where he was a member of the Delta Kappa Epsilon fraternity (Eta chapter). He practiced law in Greenville until the Civil War.

Herbert entered the Confederate Army as a second lieutenant. He served as captain of the Greenville Guards, and was later promoted to the rank of colonel of the Eighth Regiment, Alabama Infantry. Herbert was wounded at the Battle of the Wilderness May 6, 1864.

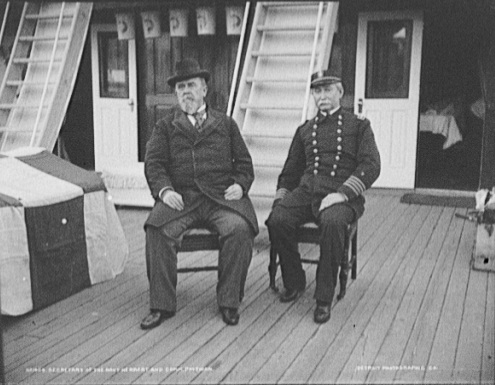
Secretary Herbert meeting with Commander Robert Lees Phythian

After the war, Herbert returned to his law practice in Greenville, Alabama. He was elected to Congress in 1877 from Montgomery, Alabama as a Democrat. He served eight terms in this office. During his tenure as Congressman, Herbert was chairman of the Committee on Naval Affairs and was largely responsible for the increased appropriations which led to the revival of the United States Navy. However, he was among those who favored a more limited program than the one proposed by Secretary of the Navy Benjamin F. Tracy in 1890, which called for 40 battleships; only four battleships were authorized as a result. Tracy had been influenced by the works of naval strategist Captain Alfred Thayer Mahan, which called for a large fleet capable of offensive action. Herbert also became well known for leading a charge in Congress to reduce the funding of the United States Geological Survey, resulting in a public feud with paleontologist Othniel Charles Marsh.

Herbert espoused racist views during his tenure in Congress, namely in his opposition to the Reconstruction Acts. Herbert vocally opposed the acts and any granting of suffrage to African Americans, speaking in congress and claiming African Americans were unfit to have such rights. He claimed "the granting of universal suffrage to the Negro was the mistake of the nineteenth century".

In 1893, President Grover Cleveland appointed Herbert as Secretary of the Navy. By this time Herbert was able to muster support for an enlarged navy, despite the Depression of 1893, and brought the fleet to some level of preparedness for the Spanish–American War. Having converted to Mahan's school of naval thought, five battleships (the Kearsarge and Illinois classes) and sixteen torpedo boats were authorized during Herbert's tenure.

From 1897, when he left his Cabinet seat, to his death on March 6, 1919, six days before his 85th birthday, Herbert practiced law in Washington, D.C.

== Namesake ==
USS Herbert (DD-160) was named in honor of Secretary Herbert.

U.S. House of Representatives
Preceded by Jeremiah Norman Williams	Member of the U.S. House of Representatives from Alabama's 2nd congressional district 1877–1893	Succeeded by Jesse F. Stallings
Government offices
Preceded by Benjamin F. Tracy	United States Secretary of the Navy; 1893–1897	Succeeded by John D. Long
