= Journans =

Commune in Auvergne-Rhône-Alpes, France

- Commune
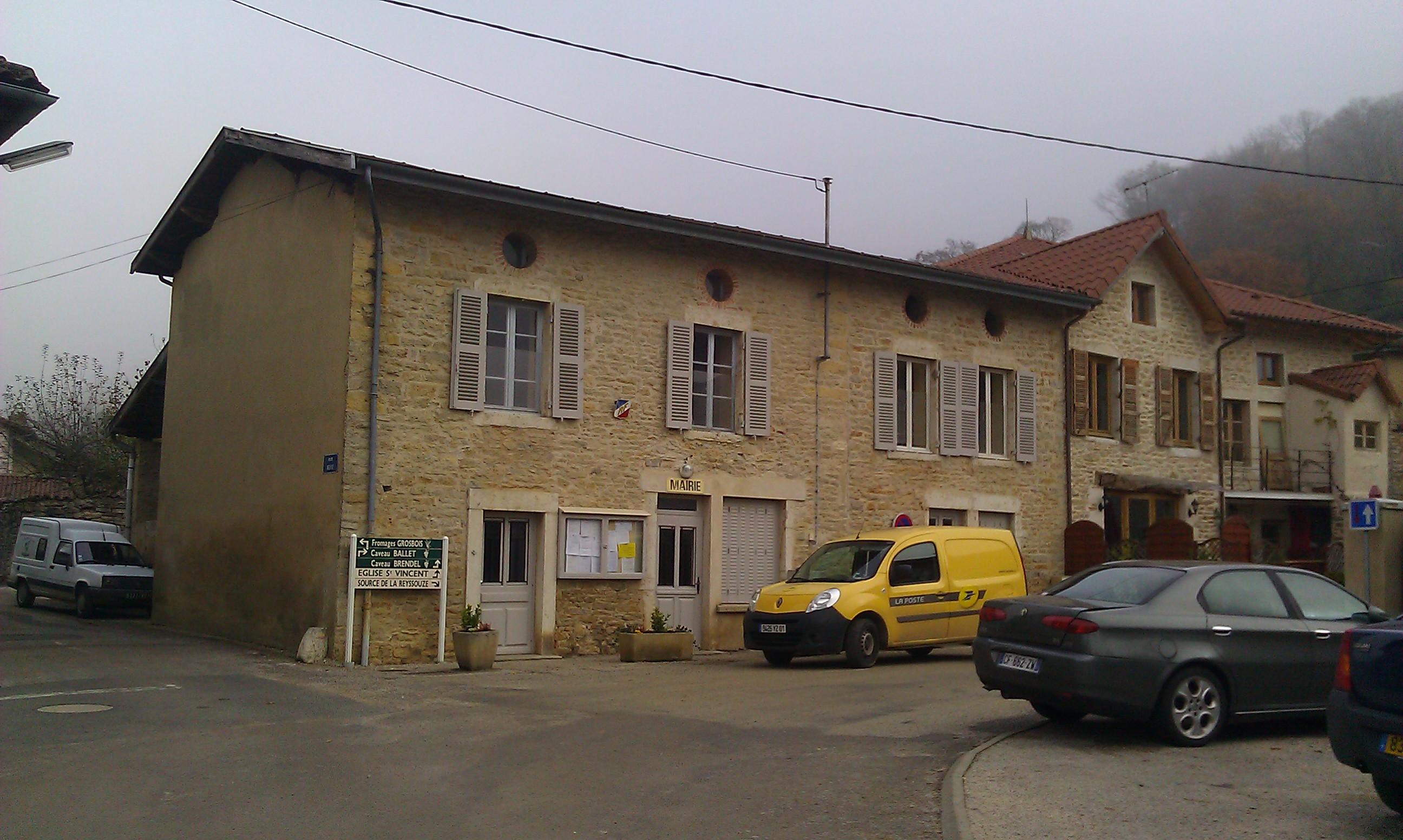
- Town hall
- Location of Journans
- Location within France Location within Auvergne-Rhône-Alpes
- Coordinates: 46°08′44″N 5°20′00″E
- Country: France
- Region: Auvergne-Rhône-Alpes
- Department: Ain
- Arrondissement: Bourg-en-Bresse
- Canton: Ceyzériat
- Intercommunality: CA Bassin de Bourg-en-Bresse

Government
  - Mayor (2026–32): Yves Perron
- Area^{1}: 2.43 km^{2} (0.94 sq mi)
- Elevation: 290 m (950 ft)
- Highest elevation: 506 m (1,660 ft)
- Lowest elevation: 269 m (883 ft)
- Population (2023): 387
  - Density: 159/km^{2} (412/sq mi)
- Time zone: UTC+01:00 (CET)
  - Summer (DST): UTC+02:00 (CEST)
- INSEE/Postal code: 01197 /01250
- ^{1} French Land Register data, which excludes lakes, ponds, glaciers > 1 km^{2} (0.386 sq mi or 247 acres) and river estuaries.

Journans (French pronunciation: [ʒuʁnɑ̃]) is a commune in the Ain department in eastern France.

== Population ==
Historical population
Year	Pop.	±% p.a.
1968	191	—
1975	174	−1.32%
1982	277	+6.87%
1990	286	+0.40%
1999	330	+1.60%
2007	322	−0.31%
2012	341	+1.15%
2017	355	+0.81%
2023	387	+1.45%
Source: INSEE

== See also ==
- Communes of the Ain department
