= Certines =

Commune in Auvergne-Rhône-Alpes, France

- Commune
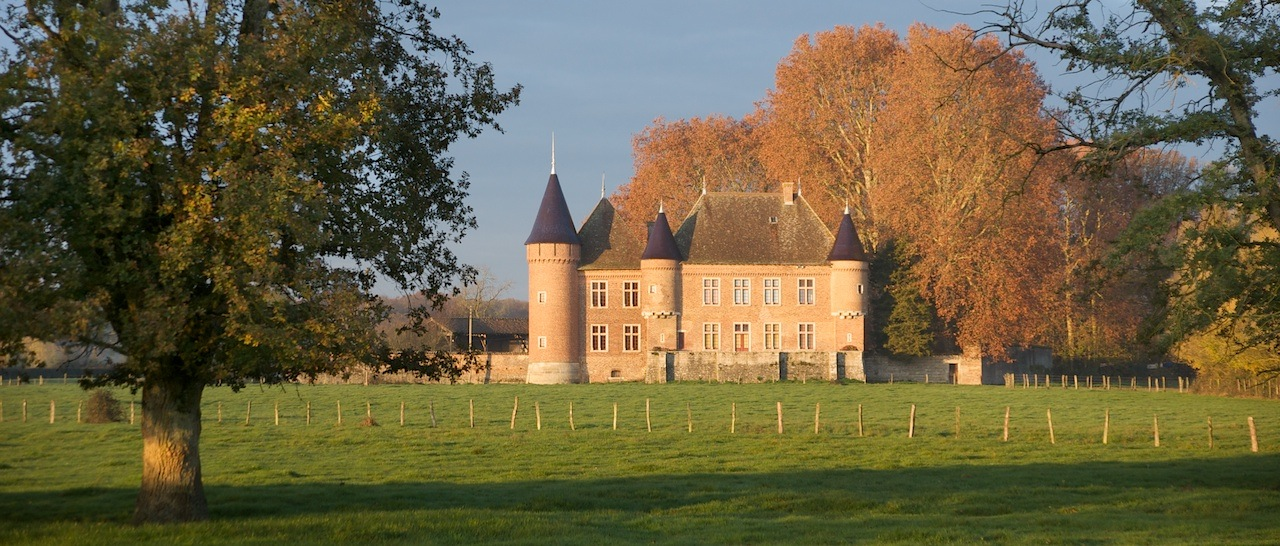
- Chateau of Genoud
- Location of Certines
- Location within France Location within Auvergne-Rhône-Alpes
- Coordinates: 46°07′59″N 5°16′01″E
- Country: France
- Region: Auvergne-Rhône-Alpes
- Department: Ain
- Arrondissement: Bourg-en-Bresse
- Canton: Ceyzériat
- Intercommunality: Bassin de Bourg-en-Bresse

Government
  - Mayor (2026–32): Denis Tavel
- Area^{1}: 15.92 km^{2} (6.15 sq mi)
- Highest elevation: 276 m (906 ft)
- Lowest elevation: 247 m (810 ft)
- Population (2023): 1,531
  - Density: 96.17/km^{2} (249.1/sq mi)
- Time zone: UTC+01:00 (CET)
  - Summer (DST): UTC+02:00 (CEST)
- INSEE/Postal code: 01069 /01240
- ^{1} French Land Register data, which excludes lakes, ponds, glaciers > 1 km^{2} (0.386 sq mi or 247 acres) and river estuaries.

Certines (French pronunciation: [sɛʁtin]) is a commune in the Ain department in eastern France.

== Population ==
Historical population
Year	Pop.	±% p.a.
1968	429	—
1975	491	+1.95%
1982	675	+4.65%
1990	916	+3.89%
1999	1,288	+3.86%
2007	1,432	+1.33%
2012	1,443	+0.15%
2017	1,517	+1.01%
2023	1,531	+0.15%
Source: INSEE

== See also ==
- Communes of the Ain department
