= Week of Prayer for Christian Unity =

Ecumenical Christian observance

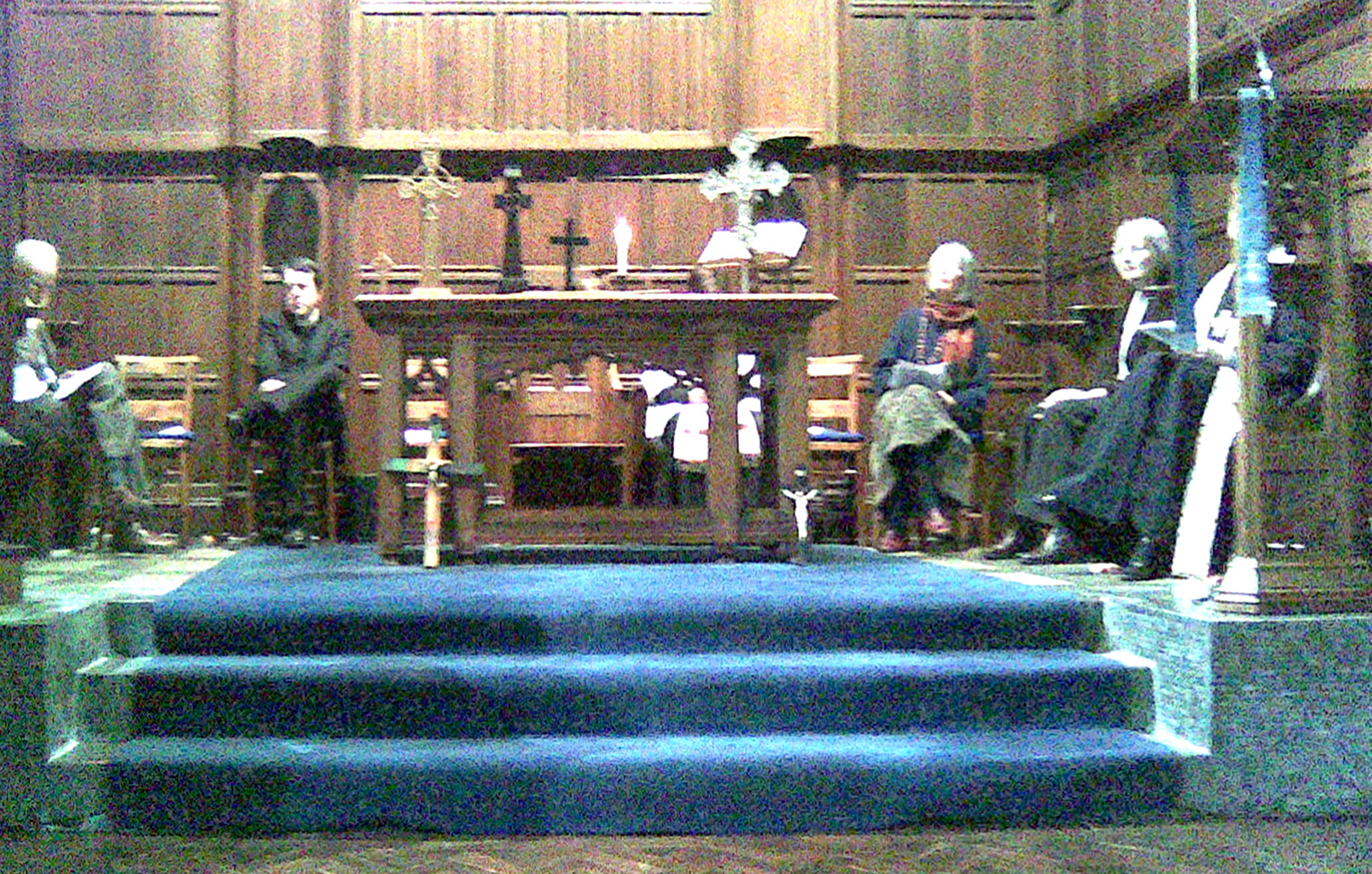
Christian crosses at a joint service for the Week of Prayer for Christian Unity

The Week of Prayer for Christian Unity is an ecumenical Christian observance in the Christian calendar that is celebrated internationally. It is kept annually between Ascension Day and Pentecost in the Southern Hemisphere and between 18 January and 25 January in the Northern Hemisphere. It is an octave, that is, an observance lasting eight days, and was founded in 1908 as the Octave of Christian Unity by Fr Paul Wattson and Lurana White, the co-founders of the Society of the Atonement.

The Week of Prayer for Christian Unity is annually coordinated by the World Council of Churches, with participation by its member Churches, which include the Assyrian Church of the East, the Oriental Orthodox Churches, the Eastern Orthodox Church, the Old Catholic Church, the Moravian Church, the Lutheran churches, the Anglican Communion, the Mennonite Churches, the Methodist churches and the Reformed churches, as well as the Baptist churches and the Pentecostal churches. The Roman Catholic Church, which is an observer in the World Council of Churches, also celebrates the Week of Prayer for Christian Unity.

== History ==
=== Beginnings ===
The Week of Prayer for Christian Unity began in 1908 as the Octave of Christian Unity, and focused on prayer for church unity. The dates of the week were proposed by Fr Paul Wattson and Lurana White, the co-founders of the Society of the Atonement. Before they became converts to Catholicism from Episcopalianism, they conceived of the week beginning with the Feast of the Chair of Saint Peter, which was then kept on the General Roman Calendar on January 18 - the day that the Anglican Church kept the Feast of the Confession of Saint Peter - and concluding with the Feast of the Conversion of Saint Paul on January 25.

In 1960 Pope John XXIII removed from the General Roman Calendar the January 18th feast of the Chair of Peter, along with seven other feast days that were second feasts of a single saint or mystery and merged it with the Feast of the Chair of St. Peter at Antioch, kept on February 22. This calendar was incorporated in the 1962 Roman Missal. Hence, only those Catholics who still retain the General Roman Calendar of 1954 keep the January 18th Feast, although the date continued to serve as the beginning for the Unity Octave. The Feast of the Confession of Peter continues to be observed by Anglican churches on January 18.

Pope Pius X officially blessed the concept, and Benedict XV "encouraged its observance throughout the entire Roman Catholic Church." For a while, the observance was renamed the "Chair of Unity Octave" by Wattson, in order to emphasize the relationship between Christian unity and the Petrine See (i.e., the papacy).

Protestant leaders in the mid-1920s also proposed an annual octave of prayer for unity amongst Christians, leading up to Pentecost Sunday (the traditional commemoration of the establishment of the Church).

=== Evolution ===
Abbé Paul Couturier of Lyon, France, who has been called "the father of spiritual ecumenism", had a slightly different approach from that of Wattson and White. He advocated prayer "for the unity of the Church as Christ wills it, and in accordance with the means he wills", thereby enabling other Christians with differing views of the Petrine ministry to join in the prayer. In 1935, he proposed naming the observance "Universal Week of Prayer for Christian Unity", a proposal accepted by the Catholic Church in 1966. Couturier's message influenced a Sardinian nun, Maria Sagheddu, whose deep, prayerful, sacrificial devotion to the cause of unity is held up by Rome as an example to be followed.

In 1941, the Faith and Order Conference changed the date for observing the week of unity prayer to that observed by Catholics. In 1948, with the founding of the World Council of Churches, the Week of Prayer for Christian Unity became increasingly recognised by different churches throughout the world.

In 1958, the French Catholic group Unité Chrétienne and the Faith and Order Commission of the World Council of Churches (a body which includes, among others, most of the world's Orthodox churches as well as many Anglican, Baptist, Lutheran, Methodist, Reformed, United and Independent churches) begin co-operative preparation of materials for the Week of Prayer. The year 1968 saw the first official use of materials prepared jointly by the Faith and Order Commission and the Pontifical Council for Promoting Christian Unity, representing the entire Catholic Church. Collaboration and cooperation between these two organizations has increased steadily since, resulting recently in joint publications in the same format.

== Observation ==
In the Southern Hemisphere, where January is a vacation time, churches often find other days to celebrate the week of prayer, for example around Pentecost (as originally suggested by the Faith and Order movement in 1926, and Pope Leo XIII in 1894), which is also a symbolic date for the unity of the church.

The 2008 Week of Prayer for Christian Unity was celebrated as the centennial. For 2012, 1 Corinthians 15:51 was chosen with the theme "We will all be changed". The 2016 Week was provided by the Churches of Latvia, and the theme was that all Christians are 'Called to proclaim the mighty acts of the Lord' (indirectly referring to 1 Peter 2:9). The theme for the week of prayer in 2019, "Justice, and only justice, you shall pursue ..." was inspired by Deuteronomy 16:18-20.

The 2024 week of prayer drew together churches across the globe under the theme "You shall love the Lord your God ... and your neighbour as yourself" (Luke 10:27) with materials prepared by an ecumenical team from Burkina Faso, facilitated by the local Chemin Neuf Community (CCN).

== See also ==
- Pontifical Council for Promoting Christian Unity
- Schism (religion)
- World Council of Churches
