= Lurana White =

Roman Catholic nun, convert, and congregation founder

The Reverend Mother Lurana Mary Francis White S. A.
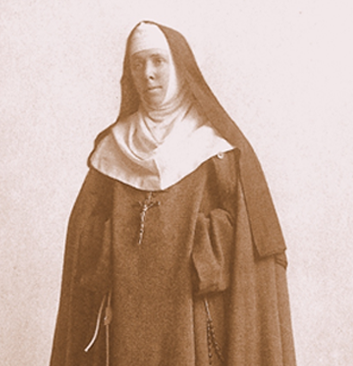

Personal life
- Born: April 12, 1870 Warwick, Orange County, New York
- Died: April 15, 1935 (aged 65) Garrison, Putnam County, New York
- Known for: Co-founder of the Society of the Atonement; Founder of the Franciscan Sisters of the Atonement

Religious life
- Religion: Catholic

Lurana Mary Francis White, SA (1870-1935) was an American Catholic nun who converted from the Episcopal Church and co-founded of the Society of the Atonement. In the words of congregation historian Fr Charles LaFontaine, she "had the distinction of founding a religious community on equal terms with a man."

== Early life and education ==
"Loulie" White was the daughter of Annie Mary Wheeler and Francis Steele (Frank) White, high church Episcopalians. Her father came from a prominent banking family. She grew up in a stately home in Warwick known as "The Terrace," with one sibling, her younger sister Annie Elsie. She may have received the name Lurana in honor of her paternal grandmother, and the family pronounced it Lur-RAY-na. Her maternal grandmother saved money on her behalf to build up a dowry, and it became the nugget of the money she would one day use to purchase her congregation's property. Her parents baptized her as an Episcopalian at Christ Church, Warwick, New York on June 22, 1873. Her family remembered that as a girl she admired St. Thomas Becket, the archbishop of Canterbury, whom King Henry II martyred for his faith in 1170.

She went to elementary school at the Warwick Institute, and then attended a finishing school, Seven Gables, in Bridgeton, New Jersey. She then attended the Episcopal St. Agnes School for Girls in Albany, New York, run by the Episcopal Sisters of the Holy Child Jesus. St. Agnes later merged with the Roman Catholic Kenwood Academy to become what is known today as the Doane Stuart School.

== Religious life and the "palace of lady poverty" ==
In May 1893, at age 23, she attended a prayer service at the Church of the Redeemer Episcopal/Anglican in Queens, New York. There she heard the Reverend Henry Adams invite young people to commit themselves to God. In 1894, when she was 24, she told her family she wanted to join the Anglican Community of the Sisters of the Holy Child Jesus, and, very much against her mother's will, she entered the congregation in 1895 as a novice. Anglican sisters did not publicly profess vows but only promises, and they did not make any promise of poverty. Her novice mistress had given her a life of St. Francis of Assisi. As she read it and her devotion to his life of voluntary simplicity grew, she wished to establish a community with vows, particularly of poverty. She left the congregation, and temporarily moved to New York City to live with her aunt. In June 1897 she accompanied her aunt to England, and received permission from the Anglican Society of the Sisters of Bethany to found a new order.

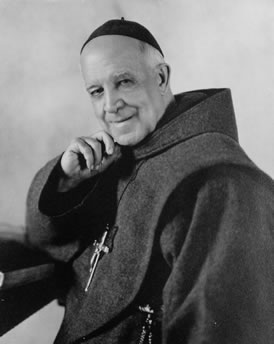
Father Paul Wattson

Through lay friends of her original community she learned of the work of an Episcopal priest, Father Lewis Wattson, who ministered in Omaha, Nebraska. (He had not yet changed his name to Paul.) He shared her attraction to Franciscan spirituality. They began a correspondence that continued from early 1896 to late summer 1898, and agreed to establish respective congregations for women and men under one umbrella, based on the vow of poverty.

Lurana White and Lewis (later Paul) Wattson met for the first time at her family mansion, The Terrace, in 1898. "Our Father arrived in Warwick toward evening, on October 3rd, the Eve of St. Francis Day," she wrote in her memoirs. "The future Father Founder told the story of his call and of his hopes and I told him of my search for St. Francis and Corporate Poverty. Then there came to us both the dawning realization of the oneness of God's call." On October 7 they exchanged crucifixes and wrote what they called "Covenant texts." Then on December 15 they formally founded the Society of Atonement at what is now Graymoor, New York, focusing on Christian unity between Episcopalians and Catholics. This unity, what Wattson called "At-One-Ment," was central to all they did. They chose the property they dubbed Graymoor (a portmanteau of two priests' names) because Lurana White knew of some available property with an abandoned church, known as Dimond House, near her family home. After a handshake agreement with the property owners, they agreed to call the women's congregation Franciscan Sisters of the Atonement, and the men's Franciscan Friars of the Atonement. Graymoor had fine land, but the buildings were run down and cold in the winter. Wattson called the men's quarters, really an abandoned paint shack, "The palace of lady poverty." Wattson changed his first name to Paul in July 1900.

== Move to Roman Catholicism ==
During the near-first decade of their community, some Episcopalians occasionally criticized them for high-church ways. They may have also seemed too "Romish" because Father Walter S. Howard, their spiritual director, thought they were overly Franciscan. Others chafed that they actively (and controversially) worked toward a reunion of the Episcopal/Anglican and Catholic churches, in concert with the Rev. Spencer Jones in England. Gradually they became unwelcome in Episcopal circles, and Paul Wattson could no longer preach, because of their problematic and growing deference to the pope. The split came in October, 1907, after a doctrinal disagreement at a gathering of the Episcopal Church. Two years later, in 1909, after much discernment and negotiation, the Society of the Atonement became the first religious community since the Reformation to collectively enter the Roman Catholic Church. Mother Lurana White wrote that very evening, "Thank God! We are safe in St. Peter's boat!"

== Relationship with Servant of God Catherine de Hueck Doherty ==
In 1927 White became a spiritual mentor to Servant of God Catherine de Hueck Doherty, who made an extended retreat at Graymoor to recover from an exhausting speaking schedule. While at Graymoor Doherty became a third-order Franciscan and volunteered as a part-time personal assistant to White. During that time Doherty claimed to witness a healing from the ministrations of Wattson, and both she and White attested to a second one, a healing of Doherty's son (147).

== Property dispute ==
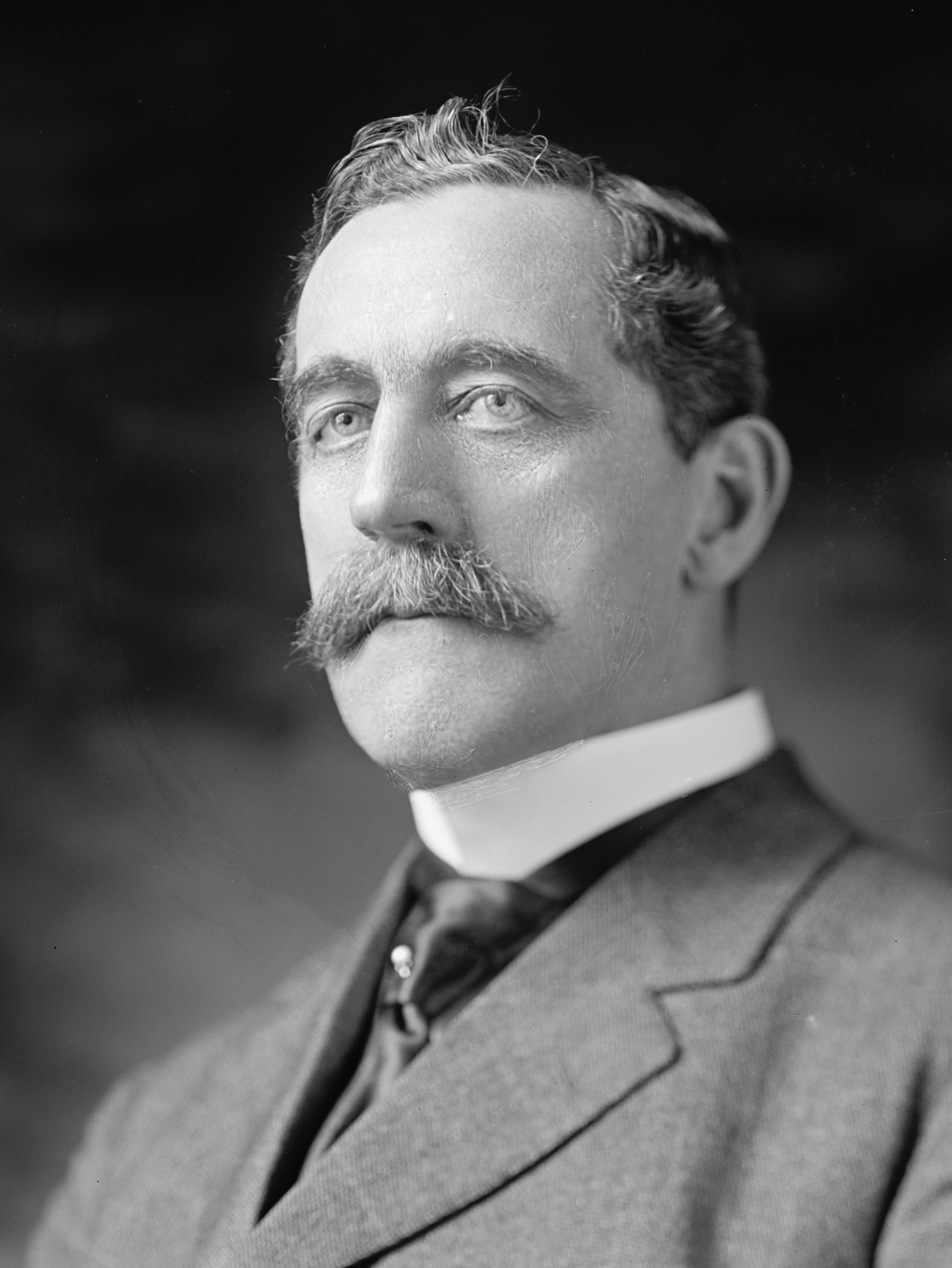
Hamilton Fish II

A public argument ensued with the rector of the Church of the Advent in Boston over who owned the property at Graymoor, and eventually the donors demanded it back, with that initial handshake agreement underlying much of the confusion. Years of legal back-and-forth followed since the sisters owned some of the land. After the death of one of the plaintiffs, in 1917, while the US was entering World War I, the judge decided against the Society of the Atonement and in favor of the plaintiffs. The sisters prepared to move into a building on the part of the property they did own, because Mother White did not wish to appeal and violate her vow of poverty. Just as the sisters were preparing to move, Hamilton Fish II intervened to broker a purchase, and after much legal wrangling, Mother White received the quit-claim deed in exchange for her payment of $2,000 on June 11, 1918. LaFontaine notes that rather ironically after such a fight over the community's controversial move to the Catholic church, the plaintiffs later became Roman Catholic themselves.

== Aftermath and her death ==
Some see White and Wattson's fervent desire for unity as specifically foregrounding the Decree on Ecumenism at the Second Vatican Council in 1964. The decree stated that Roman Catholics and other Christians should pray together for Christian unity. They were also direct forerunners, in their Faith and Order ecumenical discussions and their Church Unity Octave begun in 1908, of the Faith and Order Commission of the World Council of Churches, formed in 1948. This lives on in this body, and also in the Week of Prayer for Christian Unity, observed each January by Catholic, Protestant, and Orthodox churches.

Mother Lurana White died on April 15, 1935. She is buried in the Franciscan Sisters of the Atonement Cemetery, Garrison, New York. Standing over her is a white marble statue of St. Francis of Assisi. Her tomb is inscribed, "Repairer of the Breach," because both she and Father Wattson were devoted to fostering Christian unity between Anglicans and Catholics.
