= Tossiat =

Commune in Auvergne-Rhône-Alpes, France

- Commune
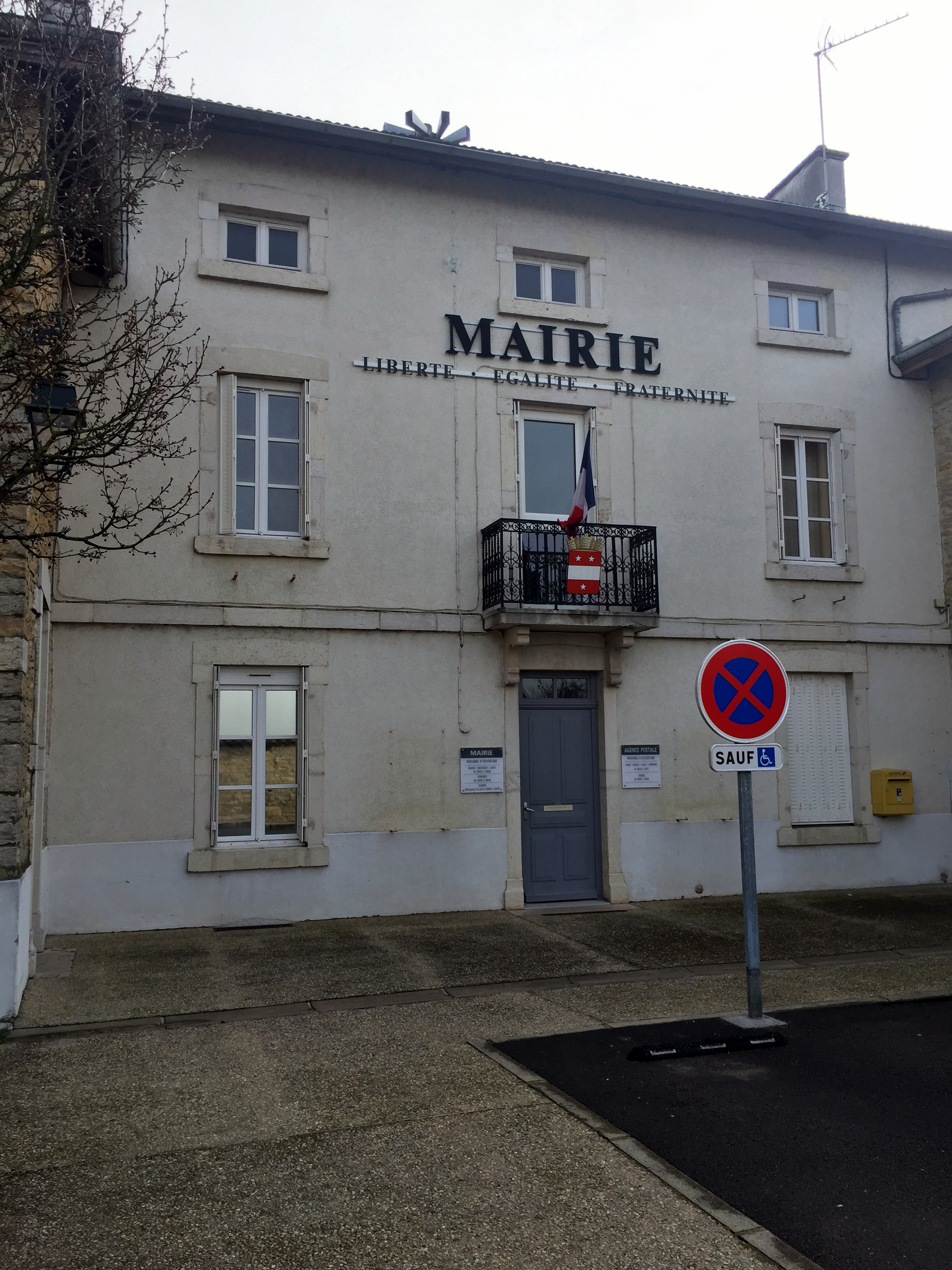
- Town hall

- Coat of arms
- Location of Tossiat
- Location within France Location within Auvergne-Rhône-Alpes
- Coordinates: 46°08′31″N 5°18′57″E
- Country: France
- Region: Auvergne-Rhône-Alpes
- Department: Ain
- Arrondissement: Bourg-en-Bresse
- Canton: Ceyzériat
- Intercommunality: CA Bassin de Bourg-en-Bresse

Government
  - Mayor (2026–32): Jean-Marie Davi
- Area^{1}: 10.17 km^{2} (3.93 sq mi)
- Highest elevation: 501 m (1,644 ft)
- Lowest elevation: 244 m (801 ft)
- Population (2023): 1,425
  - Density: 140.1/km^{2} (362.9/sq mi)
- Time zone: UTC+01:00 (CET)
  - Summer (DST): UTC+02:00 (CEST)
- INSEE/Postal code: 01422 /01250
- ^{1} French Land Register data, which excludes lakes, ponds, glaciers > 1 km^{2} (0.386 sq mi or 247 acres) and river estuaries.

Tossiat (French pronunciation: [tɔsja]) is a commune in the Ain department in eastern France.

== Population ==
Historical population
Year	Pop.	±% p.a.
1968	534	—
1975	569	+0.91%
1982	879	+6.41%
1990	979	+1.36%
1999	1,115	+1.46%
2007	1,357	+2.49%
2012	1,371	+0.21%
2017	1,362	−0.13%
2023	1,425	+0.76%
Source: INSEE

== See also ==
- Communes of the Ain department
