= Dombes Group =

Catholic-Protestant organization

Groupe des Dombes, the Dombes Group, is a gathering of 20 Roman-Catholic and 20 Protestant theologians that has met regularly since 1937 in a small monastery, the Abbey of Notre-Dame des Dombes near Lyon, France. It was found by Paul Couturier (1881-1953), a French priest who worked in ecumenical circles. It is not just a mere theological gathering but a "spiritual" approach to ecumenism. Aside from the discussion of doctrinal matters, it also includes common prayer and the "call to conversion" addressed to the churches. The Group's method in dealing with a topic is:

1. the study of a topic
2. the review of the Scriptural and historical development
3. the identification of the areas of agreement and disagreement
4. suggestions for convergence
5. a call to conversion for each church in the areas of attitudes, teachings, and practices.

The group meets for a week in September. For many years, besides meeting at the Abbey of the Dombes, the group sometimes met at Taizé. Since 1998, the meetings have been held at the Abbey of Pradines, near Roanne.

== Publications ==
- Towards one eucharistic faith? (1971)
- For the reconciliation of ministries (1972)
- The Episcopal ministry (1976)
- The Holy Spirit, the Church and the Sacraments (1979)
- The ministry of communion in the universal Church (1985)
- For the conversion of the Churches (1991)
- Mary in the plan of God and the Communion of Saints (1997 & 1998)
