= Revonnas =

Commune in Auvergne-Rhône-Alpes, France

- Commune
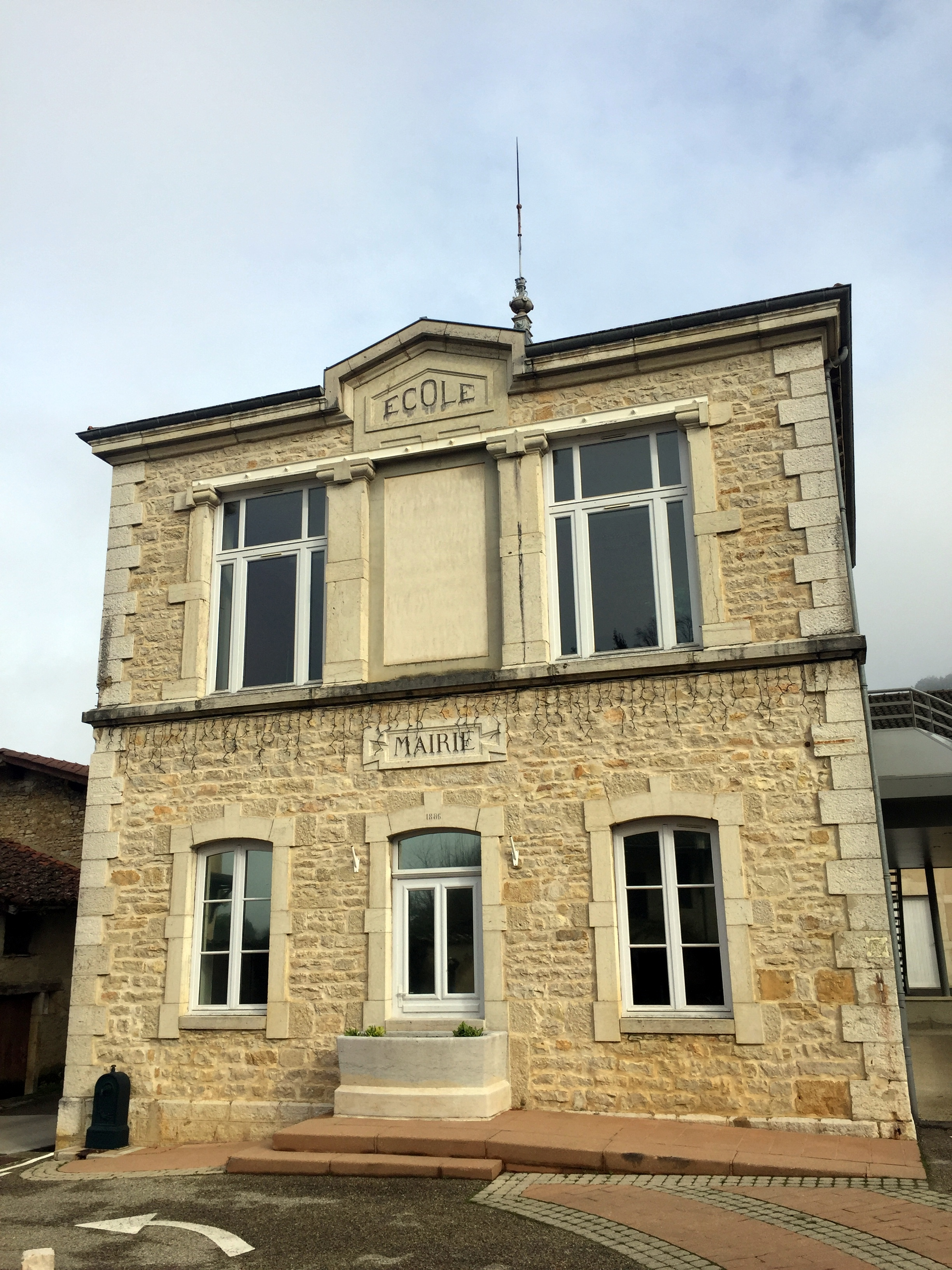
- Town hall

- Coat of arms
- Location of Revonnas
- Location within France Location within Auvergne-Rhône-Alpes
- Coordinates: 46°09′44″N 5°19′49″E
- Country: France
- Region: Auvergne-Rhône-Alpes
- Department: Ain
- Arrondissement: Bourg-en-Bresse
- Canton: Ceyzériat
- Intercommunality: CA Bassin de Bourg-en-Bresse

Government
  - Mayor (2026–32): Patrick Roche
- Area^{1}: 7.75 km^{2} (2.99 sq mi)
- Elevation: 372 m (1,220 ft)
- Highest elevation: 504 m (1,654 ft)
- Lowest elevation: 255 m (837 ft)
- Population (2023): 915
  - Density: 118/km^{2} (306/sq mi)
- Time zone: UTC+01:00 (CET)
  - Summer (DST): UTC+02:00 (CEST)
- INSEE/Postal code: 01321 /01250
- ^{1} French Land Register data, which excludes lakes, ponds, glaciers > 1 km^{2} (0.386 sq mi or 247 acres) and river estuaries.

Revonnas (French pronunciation: [ʁəvɔna]) is a commune in the Ain department in eastern France.

== Population ==
Historical population
Year	Pop.	±% p.a.
1968	284	—
1975	335	+2.39%
1982	390	+2.20%
1990	438	+1.46%
1999	492	+1.30%
2007	650	+3.54%
2012	871	+6.03%
2017	905	+0.77%
2023	915	+0.18%
Source: INSEE

== See also ==
- Communes of the Ain department
