= Maria Gabriella Sagheddu =

Italian Catholic nun

Blessed Maria Gabriella Sagheddu OCSO
- Sagheddu in her native Dorgalese dress
- Born: 17 March 1914; Dorgali, Sardinia, Kingdom of Italy
- Died: 23 April 1939 (aged 25); Grottaferrata, Rome, Kingdom of Italy
- Beatified: 25 January 1983, Basilica of Saint Paul Outside the Walls, Rome, Italy by Pope John Paul II
- Major shrine: Chapel of Unity, Monastery of Our Lady of Saint Joseph, Vitorchiano, Viterbo, Italy
- Feast: 22 April
- Patronage: Ecumenism; Ill people

Maria Sagheddu (17 March 1914 – 23 April 1939), religious name Maria Gabriella, was an Italian Trappist nun. Sagheddu had an intense spiritual devotion to ecumenism – something for which she had offered her life – since she desired that all would become one in Jesus Christ. Her childhood saw her noted as stubborn and obstinate though her increased activeness in teaching catechism and joining Azione Cattolica saw those qualities melt and become gentleness and careful attentiveness.

Sagheddu was beatified in Rome in 1983.

== Life ==
Maria Sagheddu was born to shepherds in Dorgali on 17 March 1914 as the fifth of eight children to Marcantonio Sagheddu and Caterina Cucca. Her father and one brother died in 1919 as did two other brothers sometime in their childhood. Sagheddu was said to be obstinate as a child but was also known to be obedient; she was also described as being prone to laziness on occasion. Once she concluded her initial education as a child she had to leave school to help out at home where she showed herself serious and endowed with a great sense of care and dutiful obedience. Yet she was often quick to criticize what she disliked and quick to ask for what she wanted. Sagheddu was ranked among the best at her school where she was alert and intelligent; she excelled in arithmetic most of all her other subjects.

The death of her little sister Giovanna Antonia (whom she was closest to and was born in 1915) in 1932 prompted her to deepen her faith and she decided to enroll in Azione Cattolica not long after this. It was there that she began to instruct the local children and adolescents in the faith and also to help the aged of the region. In the process she began to augment her spiritual and contemplative life; she at first taught catechism with a stick in hand. But the local priest took the stick from her on one occasion and replaced it with a note that said: "Arm yourself with patience, not a stick". Sagheddu accepted the criticism and changed her methods from that moment on.

Father Meloni helped her in entering the religious life for he was the single individual she had confided her dream in. Her mother approved this but reproached her for not having told her sooner. One brother even disapproved of her decision and believed that she would bring nothing more than disgrace upon their home. On 30 September 1935 she entered the Trappists at their convent in Grottaferrata near Rome where she was given the religious name of Maria Gabriella; she was clothed in the habit for the first time on 13 April 1936 and made her vows on 31 October 1937 which marked the Feast of Christ the King. The abbess of the convent at that time there was Mother Maria Pia Gullini whose enthusiasm for ecumenism (a fruit of the efforts of Abbé Paul Couturier) was passed on to the others there. Sagheddu became an ardent devotee to this cause and she offered herself as a spiritual sacrifice for the unification of the Christian Church during the special week for Christian unification in 1938.

Sagheddu fell ill with tuberculosis after a diagnosis in Rome and suffered with the disease for fifteen months before she died during the evening on 23 April 1939. The doctors declared her condition incurable in May 1938. The significant fact here is that the Gospel reading for that week included the words: "There will be one flock and one shepherd" (John 10:16). Sagheddu's remains are kept in a chapel at a Trappistine convent at Vitorchiano near Viterbo and were found to be incorrupt in 1957 upon exhumation.

== Spirituality ==
Pope John Paul II referred to her in his papal encyclical Ut Unum Sint in which he said:

Praying for unity is not a matter reserved only to those who actually experience the lack of unity among Christians. In the deep personal dialogue which each of us must carry on with the Lord in prayer, concern for unity cannot be absent. ...It was in order to reaffirm this duty that I set before the faithful of the Catholic Church a model which I consider exemplary, the model of a Trappistine Sister, Blessed Maria Gabriella of Unity, whom I beatified on 25 January 1983. Sister Maria Gabriella, called by her vocation to be apart from the world, devoted her life to meditation and prayer centered on chapter seventeen of Saint John's Gospel, and offered her life for Christian unity. ...The example of Sister Maria Gabriella is instructive; it helps us to understand that there are no special times, situations or places of prayer for unity. Christ's prayer to the Father is offered as a model for everyone, always and everywhere.

== Beatification ==
The beatification cause opened in Frascati in 1958 and she became titled as a Servant of God though the formal introduction of the cause came under Pope Paul VI on 15 July 1965. Pope John Paul II named her as Venerable on 4 May 1981 after confirming her life of heroic virtue. Sagheddu was beatified on 25 January 1983 in the Basilica of Saint Paul Outside the Walls at the conclusion of the Week of Prayer for Christian Unity which was the same observance which motivated her decision to offer her life to God. In doing so John Paul II both affirmed the holiness of her actions and set her up as a role model for Christians to follow more so as it related to ecumenism and ecumenical efforts.

After Sagheddu's death it was noted that in her Bible the seventeenth chapter of the Gospel of John had become yellowed and worn from being often read. It is in this chapter that Jesus appeals to the God the Father on behalf of his disciples. But of particular significance are verses 11 and 21 in which Jesus prays "that they may be one, as we also are" (John 17:11) and "that they all may be one, as thou, Father, in me, and I in thee; that they also may be one in us: that the world may believe that thou hast sent me" (John 17:21).

The current postulator for the cause is the Trappist nun Augusta Tescari.

== See also ==
- Ecumenism
- Catholic Church and ecumenism
- Week of Prayer for Christian Unity
- Ut Unum Sint
