= Saint-Just, Ain =

Commune in Auvergne-Rhône-Alpes, France

Saint-Just
- Commune
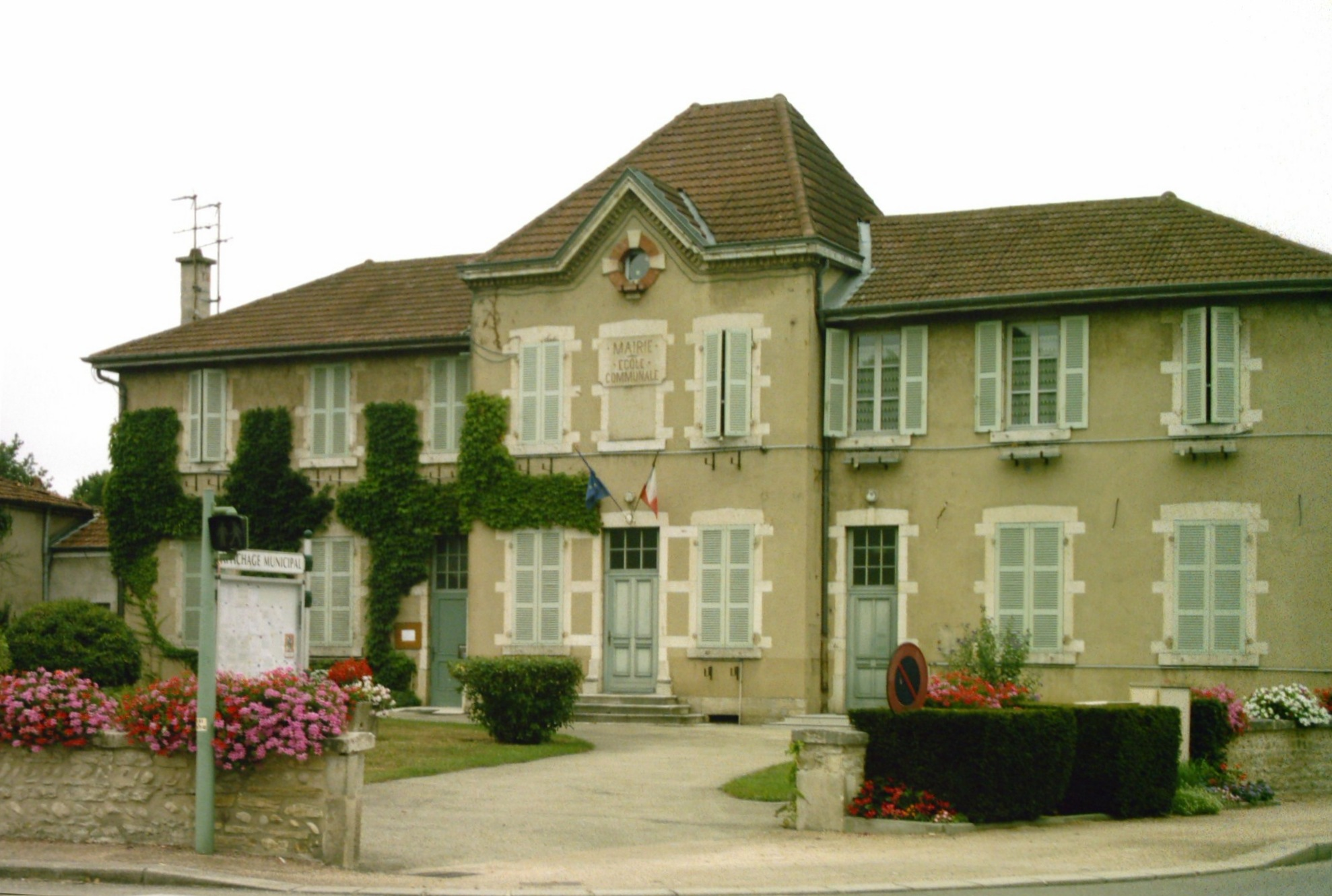
- Town hall
- Location of Saint-Just
- Location within France Location within Auvergne-Rhône-Alpes
- Coordinates: 46°11′25″N 5°16′48″E
- Country: France
- Region: Auvergne-Rhône-Alpes
- Department: Ain
- Arrondissement: Bourg-en-Bresse
- Canton: Ceyzériat
- Intercommunality: CA Bassin de Bourg-en-Bresse

Government
  - Mayor (2026–32): Patrick Levet
- Area^{1}: 3.38 km^{2} (1.31 sq mi)
- Elevation: 259 m (850 ft)
- Highest elevation: 268 m (879 ft)
- Lowest elevation: 235 m (771 ft)
- Population (2023): 952
  - Density: 282/km^{2} (729/sq mi)
- Time zone: UTC+01:00 (CET)
  - Summer (DST): UTC+02:00 (CEST)
- INSEE/Postal code: 01369 /01250
- ^{1} French Land Register data, which excludes lakes, ponds, glaciers > 1 km^{2} (0.386 sq mi or 247 acres) and river estuaries.

Saint-Just (French pronunciation: [sɛ̃ ʒy(st)]) is a commune in the Ain department in eastern France.

== Population ==
Historical population
Year	Pop.	±% p.a.
1968	212	—
1975	317	+5.92%
1982	441	+4.83%
1990	614	+4.22%
1999	789	+2.83%
2007	883	+1.42%
2012	885	+0.05%
2017	926	+0.91%
2023	952	+0.46%
Source: INSEE

== See also ==
- Communes of the Ain department
