= Paul Couturier =

French priest (1881–1953)

Saint Paul Couturier
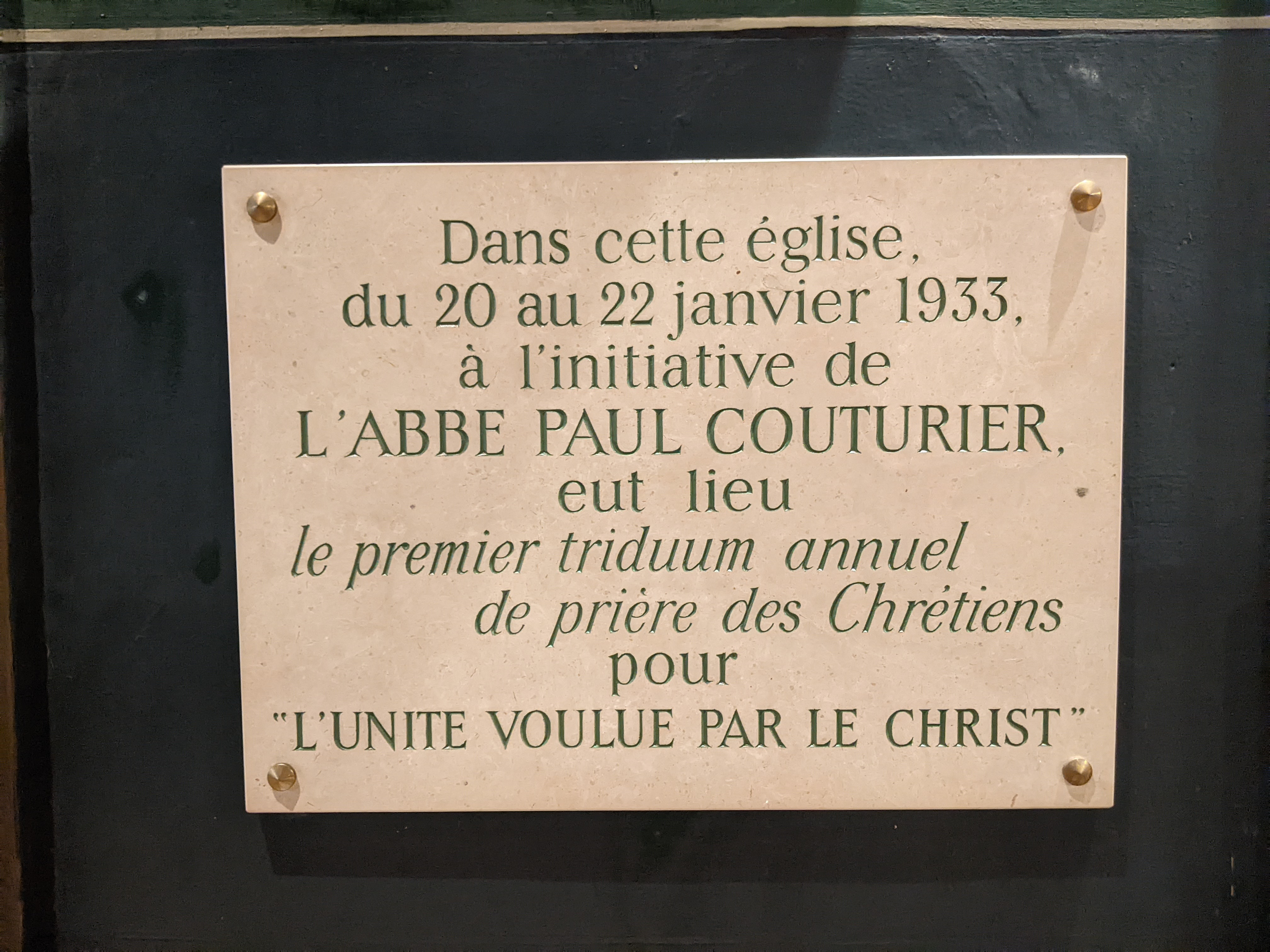
- Plaque at the Church of Saint Francis de Sales in Lyon commemorating Paul Couturier's Triduum for Christian Unity

Archimandrite
- Born: 29 July 1881; Lyon, French Third Republic
- Died: 24 March 1953; Lyon, French Fourth Republic
- Honored in: Anglican Communion
- Feast: 24 March

Paul Irénée Couturier (29 July 1881 – 24 March 1953) was a French Catholic priest and a promoter of the concept of Christian unity. He was instrumental in the establishment of the Week of Prayer for Christian Unity.

== Early life and career ==
He was born and educated at Lyon, France, to a family with some Jewish blood, then raised in Algeria, among the largely Muslim population there. Upon returning to France, Couturier was ordained a priest in 1906 as a member of the Society of St. Irenaeus. After spending three years studying physical science, he started teaching at the Institution des Chartreux at Lyon, where he remained through 1946.

== Ecumenism ==
In the 1920s Fr. Couterier worked with the thousands of Russian refugees and became acquainted with their Russian Orthodox spiritual heritage. Later, in 1932, when he was with the Benedictine Monks of Unity at the Priory of Amay-sur-Meuse, he read an introduction to the work of Cardinal Désiré-Joseph Mercier and was introduced to the work of Dom Lambert Beauduin. These stimulated his own interest in the ecumenical movement. He became an oblate there, and took the name of Benoit-Irenee in acknowledgement of his two primary sources of inspiration. In 1933, he established a Triduum for Christian Unity at Lyon, which later became an Octave in 1934, extending from the feast of the Chair of Saint Peter to the feast of the Conversion of Saint Paul. This was an outgrowth from the Octave for Church Unity which had been established by two Anglicans in 1908. However, Couturier specifically offered his Octave for the unity of any and all baptized into the Christian faith, including Orthodox, Anglican, and other Christian groups. Beginning in 1939, its name was changed to the "Universal Week of Prayer for Christian Unity".

He also worked to establish closer ties between the various Christian faiths, arranging meetings at La Trappe des Dombes and at Présinge. One of these meetings, called the Dombes Group, has met regularly since 1937. He also maintained a huge correspondence, with Jews, Muslims, Hindus, and all kinds of Christians, created and distributed a number of tracts on prayer for unity, and kept in close contact with the World Council of Churches.

He also studied the work of Pierre Teilhard de Chardin, a fellow scientist, and was strongly influenced by Chardin's view of the unity of all humanity in Christ, regardless of their beliefs. He personally believed that praying for the increased holiness of all peoples would inevitably lead to a greater understanding of God, and eventually a greater understanding of Christ by all peoples of the world.

In 1952, for his work in promoting religious unity he was granted the honorary title of Archimandrite by the Melkite Greek Catholic Church Patriarch of Antioch, Maximos IV Sayegh.

== Impact ==
Couturier's philosophy of ecumenism is reflected upon during Weeks of Prayer for Christian Unity. Cardinal Walter Kasper of the Pontifical Council for Promoting Christian Unity recently summarised important aspects of Couturier's impact:

While [Father Paul] Wattson maintained that the goal of unity was the return to the Catholic Church, Abbé Paul Couturier of Lyons (1881–1953) gave a new impetus to this Week in the 1930s, ecumenical in the true sense of the word. He changed the name "Church Unity Octave" to "Universal Week of Prayer for Christian Unity", thus furthering a unity of the Church that "Christ wills by the means he wills".

Paul Couturier's 1944 spiritual testament is very important, profound and moving; it is one of the most inspired ecumenical texts, still worth reading and meditating on today. The author speaks of an "invisible monastery", "built of all those souls whom, because of their sincere efforts to open themselves to his fire and his light, the Holy Spirit has enabled to have a deep understanding of the painful division among Christians; an awareness of this in these souls has given rise to continuous suffering and as a result, regular recourse to prayer and penance".

Paul Couturier can be considered the father of spiritual ecumenism. His influence was felt by the Dombes Group and by Roger Schutz and the Taizé Community. Sr. Maria Gabriella also drew great inspiration from him. Today, his invisible monastery is, at last, taking shape through the growing number of prayer networks between Catholic monasteries and non-Catholics, spiritual movements and communities, centres of male and female religious, Bishops, priests and lay people.

- Cardinal Walter Kasper

== Veneration ==
The Anglican Church of Australia and the Scottish Episcopal Church remember and venerate Couturier liturgically on 24 March.

Paul is remembered in the Church of England with a commemoration on 24 March.

== See also ==
- Week of Prayer for Christian Unity
- Pontifical Council for Promoting Christian Unity
- World Council of Churches
- Ecumenism
- Catholic Church and ecumenism
