= Leila Herbert =

American author (1868 - 1897)

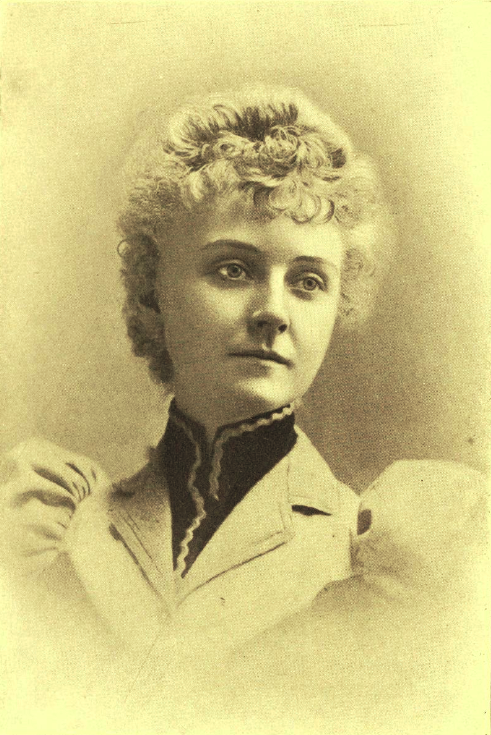
- Born: February 12, 1868; Greenville, Alabama, U.S.
- Died: December 22, 1897 (aged 29); Washington, D.C.
- Resting place: Oakwood cemetery, Montgomery, Alabama, U.S.
- Education: Hamner Hall (now, Huntingdon College); St. Agnes School (now, Doane Stuart School)
- Occupation: author
- Parent: Hilary A. Herbert
- Writing career
- Genre: biography
- Subject: George Washington
- Notable works: The first American; his homes and his households

Leila Herbert (February 12, 1868 – December 22, 1897) was an American author. During her lifetime, nothing of hers was published. She was very popular in society in Washington, D.C., and at Bar Harbor, Maine and at Newport, Rhode Island. She served as vice regent for Alabama of the Mount Vernon Ladies' Association from 1894 until her death in 1897.

== Early life and education ==
Leila Herbert was born February 12, 1868, at Greenville, Alabama. She was the daughter of Hilary Abner and Ella Bettie (Smith) Herbert.

She was graduated at Hamner Hall (now, Huntingdon College, at the age of 15, taking a number of honors, among them delivering the French valedictory. She graduated two years later at St. Agnes School (now, Doane Stuart School), Albany, New York, delivering the German valedictory.

== Career ==
Leila conducted a free night school in the home of her parents in Montgomery, Alabama. Having lost her mother at the beginning of her young adulthood, Leila at once assumed the duties that devolved upon the head of the household, meeting the responsibilities of hostess in a home conspicuous for its hospitality, as well as caring a younger sister, Ella (b. 1869) and brother, Hilary (b. 1877). At this time, her father was a member of congress from Alabama.

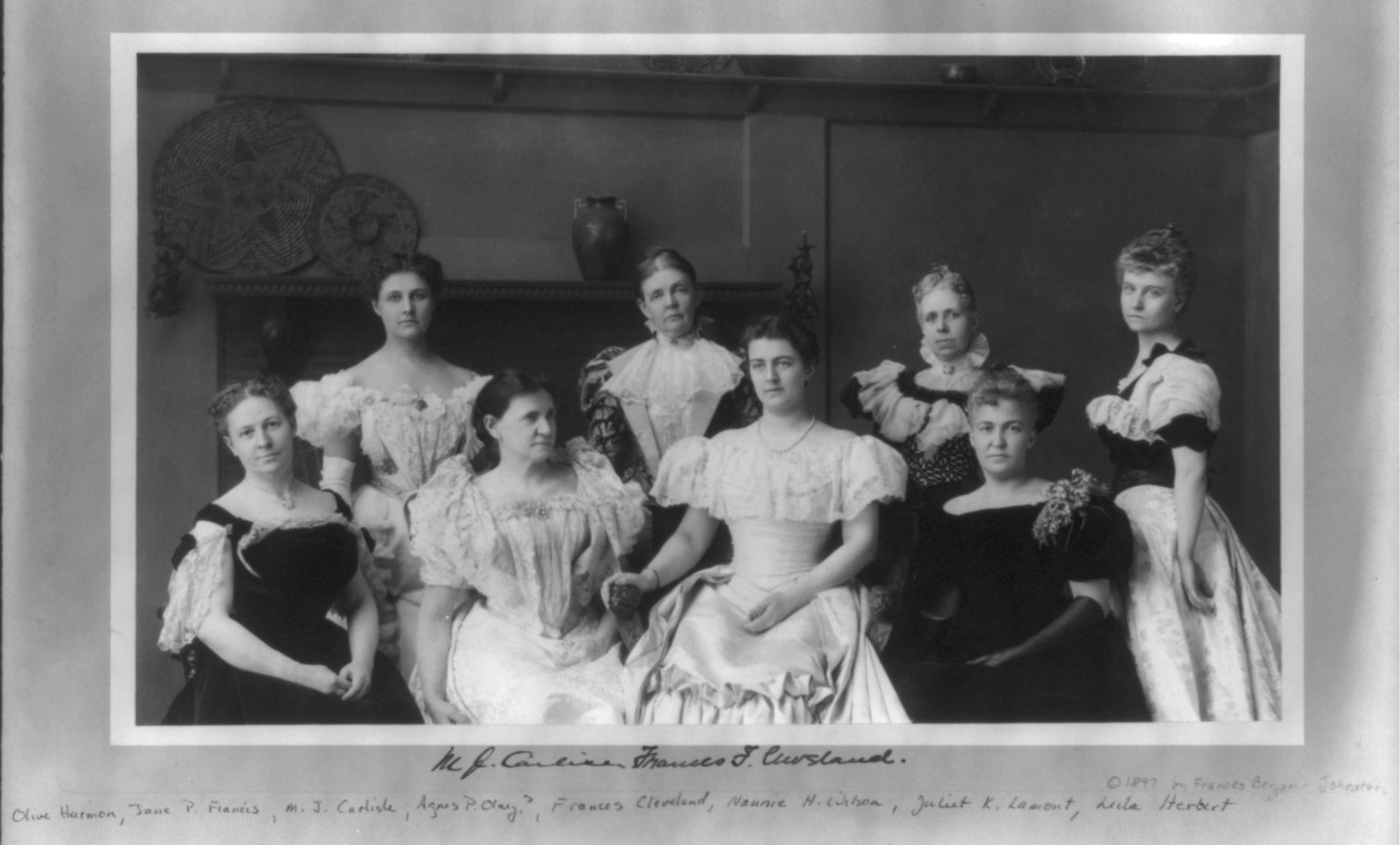
Portrait group of Frances Cleveland and the women of Pres. Cleveland's second Cabinet- Olive Harmon, Jane P. Francis, M.J. Carlisle, Agnes P. Olney, Nannie H. Wilson, Juliet K. Lamont, and Leila Herbert (l-r)

In 1893, Hilary Herbert became Secretary of the Navy in the Cabinet of President Grover Cleveland. As one of the cabinet ladies, Leila became a conspicuous favorite in an exacting society.

In 1894, Leila was elected vice regent for Alabama of the Mount Vernon Ladies' Association, a position originally held by Madame LeVert, succeeded by Mrs. Ella Herbert, and at her death, left vacant for nine years, awaiting the maturity and proven merit of the daughter to be appointed into that organization. Amidst the distractions of society and patriotic duties, Leila found time for much reading.

Four of her papers on George Washington appeared posthumously in Harper's Magazine in 1899, and published in book form the following year. She made a permanent place for herself in the literature of her country, according to the estimate of Henry Cabot Lodge, with The First American, his homes and households (1900). Owing to her official relation with the organization dedicated to the perpetual care of the home of Washington she was inspired to fit herself for this work, and had she lived, would have completed other writings of a historical character which she had planned.

Besides the published book, she left fragments of another, very incomplete, but showing that quality, a disposition to write and blot out, and write and rewrite many times. The most interesting of the records left behind her was the remnant of a diary, written with a frankness as extreme as her usual habit was reserved. It was plainly written down hastily sometimes almost illegibly-but bore every evidence of sincerity. She wrote of her childhood in her Southern home, of her family and friends, and of a trip to England.

== Death ==
In September 1897, she was thrown from her horse in Alabama, and received what was supposed to be a slight injury. She paid little heed to it and returning to Washington, D.C. in the autumn, re-established her household. As the weeks passed on, her health began to fail. She died in Washington, D.C., December 22, 1897. She is buried in Oakwood cemetery, Montgomery, Alabama.

== Selected works ==
The first American

- The first American; his homes and his households, 1900
