= Montagnat =

Commune in Auvergne-Rhône-Alpes, France

- Commune
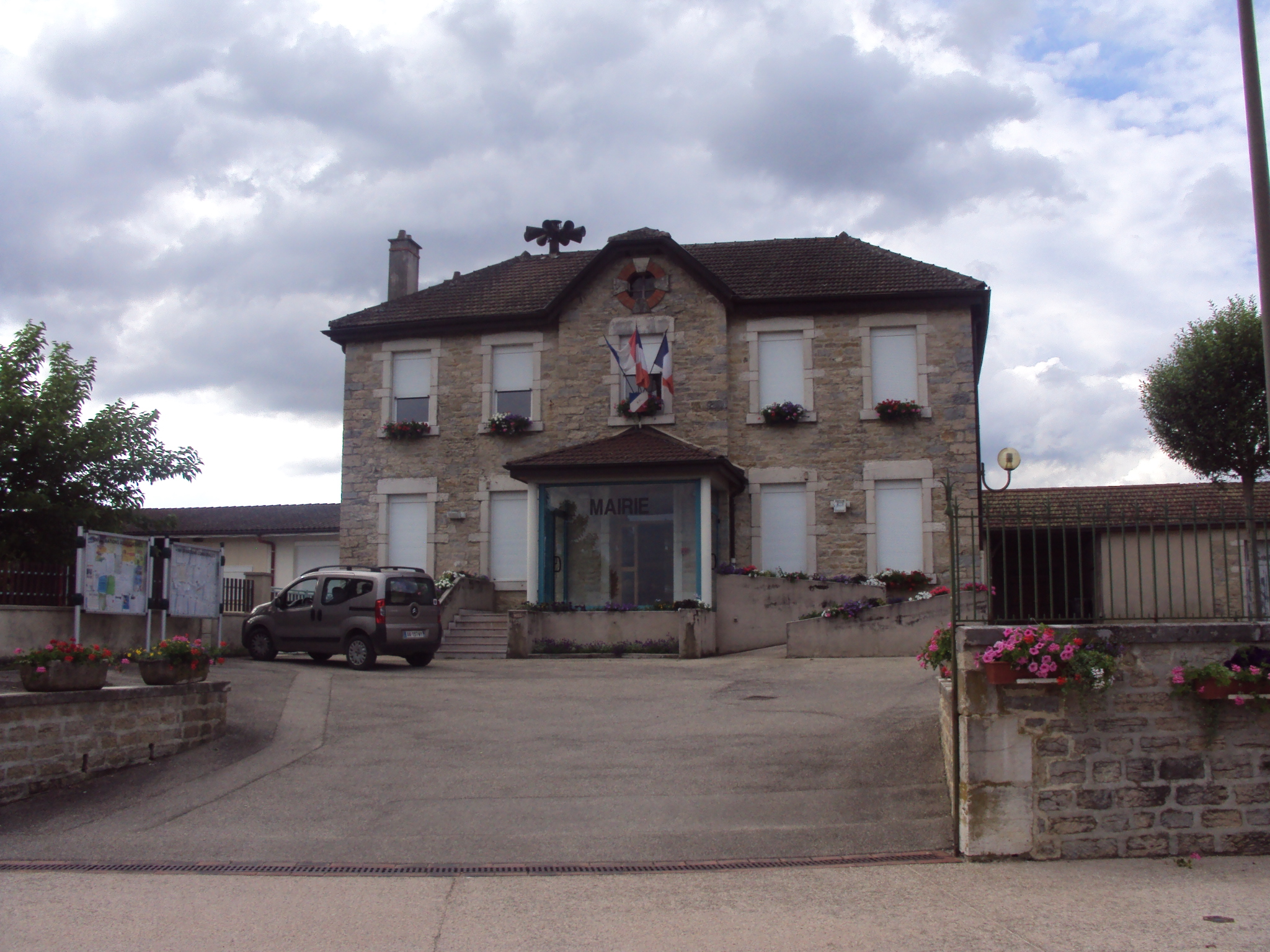
- Town hall
- Location of Montagnat
- Location within France Location within Auvergne-Rhône-Alpes
- Coordinates: 46°10′15″N 5°17′04″E
- Country: France
- Region: Auvergne-Rhône-Alpes
- Department: Ain
- Arrondissement: Bourg-en-Bresse
- Canton: Ceyzériat
- Intercommunality: CA Bassin de Bourg-en-Bresse

Government
  - Mayor (2026–32): Patrick Chanel
- Area^{1}: 13.75 km^{2} (5.31 sq mi)
- Elevation: 240 m (790 ft)
- Highest elevation: 282 m (925 ft)
- Lowest elevation: 229 m (751 ft)
- Population (2023): 2,186
  - Density: 159.0/km^{2} (411.8/sq mi)
- Time zone: UTC+01:00 (CET)
  - Summer (DST): UTC+02:00 (CEST)
- INSEE/Postal code: 01254 /01250
- ^{1} French Land Register data, which excludes lakes, ponds, glaciers > 1 km^{2} (0.386 sq mi or 247 acres) and river estuaries.

Montagnat (French pronunciation: [mɔ̃taɲa]) is a commune in the Ain department in eastern France.

== Geography ==
Montagnat is a village located near the city of Bourg-en-Bresse.

== Population ==
Historical population

| Year | Pop. | ±% p.a. |
|---|---|---|
| 1793 | 434 | — |
| 1800 | 474 | +1.27% |
| 1806 | 484 | +0.35% |
| 1821 | 403 | −1.21% |
| 1831 | 492 | +2.02% |
| 1836 | 514 | +0.88% |
| 1841 | 514 | +0.00% |
| 1846 | 514 | +0.00% |
| 1851 | 560 | +1.73% |
| 1856 | 569 | +0.32% |
| 1861 | 563 | −0.21% |
| 1866 | 531 | −1.16% |
| 1872 | 522 | −0.28% |
| 1876 | 499 | −1.12% |
| 1881 | 464 | −1.44% |
| 1886 | 493 | +1.22% |
| 1891 | 471 | −0.91% |
| 1896 | 466 | −0.21% |
| 1901 | 415 | −2.29% |

| Year | Pop. | ±% p.a. |
|---|---|---|
| 1906 | 416 | +0.05% |
| 1911 | 426 | +0.48% |
| 1921 | 404 | −0.53% |
| 1926 | 415 | +0.54% |
| 1931 | 386 | −1.44% |
| 1936 | 370 | −0.84% |
| 1946 | 398 | +0.73% |
| 1954 | 403 | +0.16% |
| 1962 | 396 | −0.22% |
| 1968 | 419 | +0.95% |
| 1975 | 633 | +6.07% |
| 1982 | 1,005 | +6.83% |
| 1990 | 1,173 | +1.95% |
| 1999 | 1,421 | +2.15% |
| 2007 | 1,568 | +1.24% |
| 2012 | 1,748 | +2.20% |
| 2017 | 1,992 | +2.65% |
| 2023 | 2,186 | +1.56% |

Source: EHESS and INSEE (1968-2023)

== See also ==
- Communes of the Ain department
