= Châtillon-la-Palud =

Commune in Auvergne-Rhône-Alpes, France

- Commune
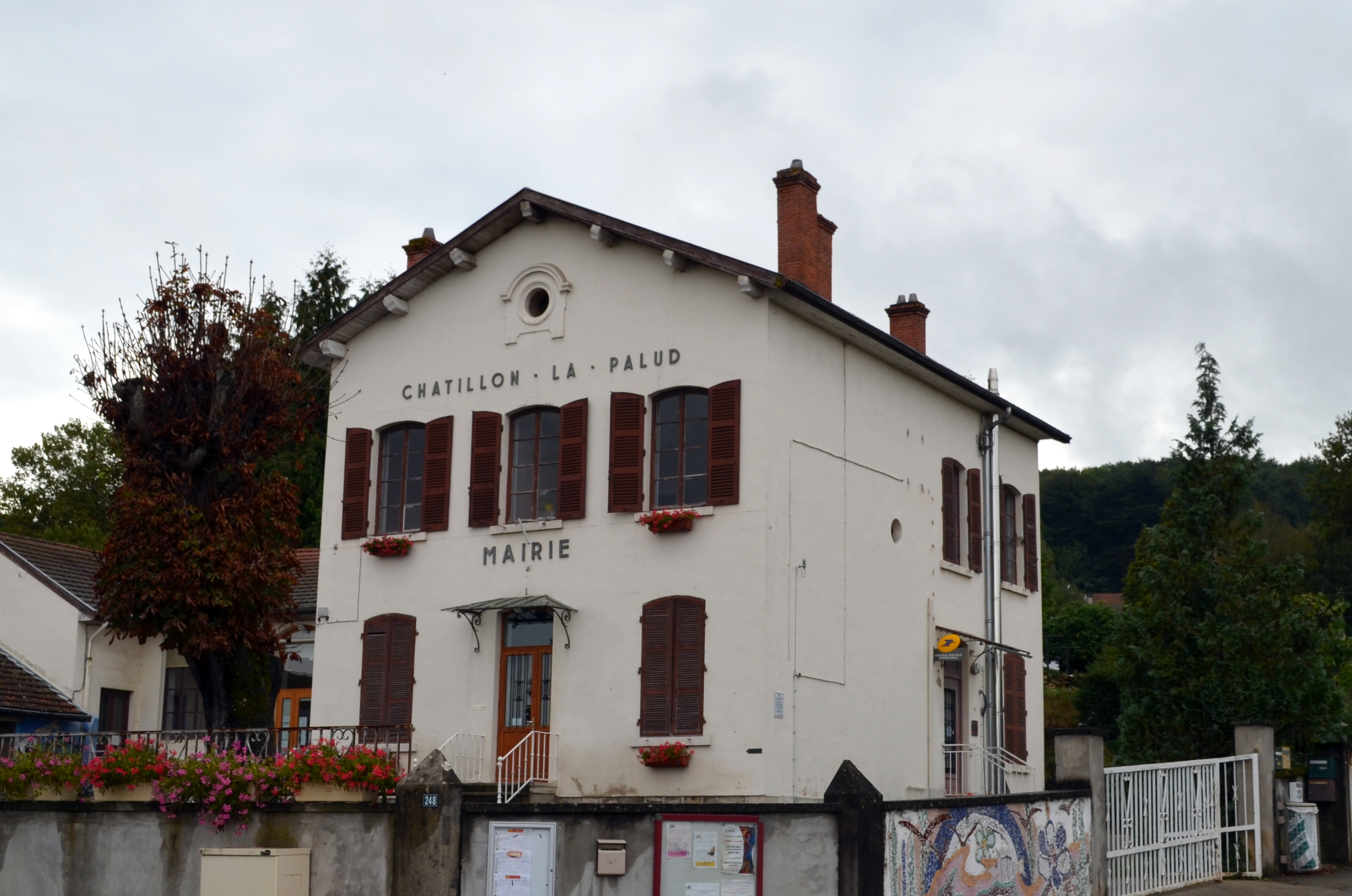
- Town hall

- Coat of arms
- Location of Châtillon-la-Palud
- Location within France Location within Auvergne-Rhône-Alpes
- Coordinates: 45°58′37″N 5°14′59″E
- Country: France
- Region: Auvergne-Rhône-Alpes
- Department: Ain
- Arrondissement: Bourg-en-Bresse
- Canton: Ceyzériat
- Intercommunality: Dombes

Government
  - Mayor (2026–32): Dominique Lamy
- Area^{1}: 14.01 km^{2} (5.41 sq mi)
- Highest elevation: 326 m (1,070 ft)
- Lowest elevation: 218 m (715 ft)
- Population (2023): 1,698
  - Density: 121.2/km^{2} (313.9/sq mi)
- Time zone: UTC+01:00 (CET)
  - Summer (DST): UTC+02:00 (CEST)
- INSEE/Postal code: 01092 /01320
- ^{1} French Land Register data, which excludes lakes, ponds, glaciers > 1 km^{2} (0.386 sq mi or 247 acres) and river estuaries.

Châtillon-la-Palud (French pronunciation: [ʃatijɔ̃ la paly]) is a commune in the Ain department in eastern France.

== Geography ==
The commune is located in the Dombes. It lies on the right bank of the Ain, which flows south through the commune's eastern part. The Albarine flows into the Ain in the southeastern part of the commune.

== Population ==
Historical population
Year	Pop.	±% p.a.
1968	660	—
1975	574	−1.97%
1982	814	+5.12%
1990	874	+0.89%
1999	1,074	+2.32%
2007	1,446	+3.79%
2012	1,578	+1.76%
2017	1,584	+0.08%
2023	1,698	+1.17%
Source: INSEE

== See also ==
- Communes of the Ain department
- Dombes
