= Villette-sur-Ain =

Commune in Auvergne-Rhône-Alpes, France

- Commune
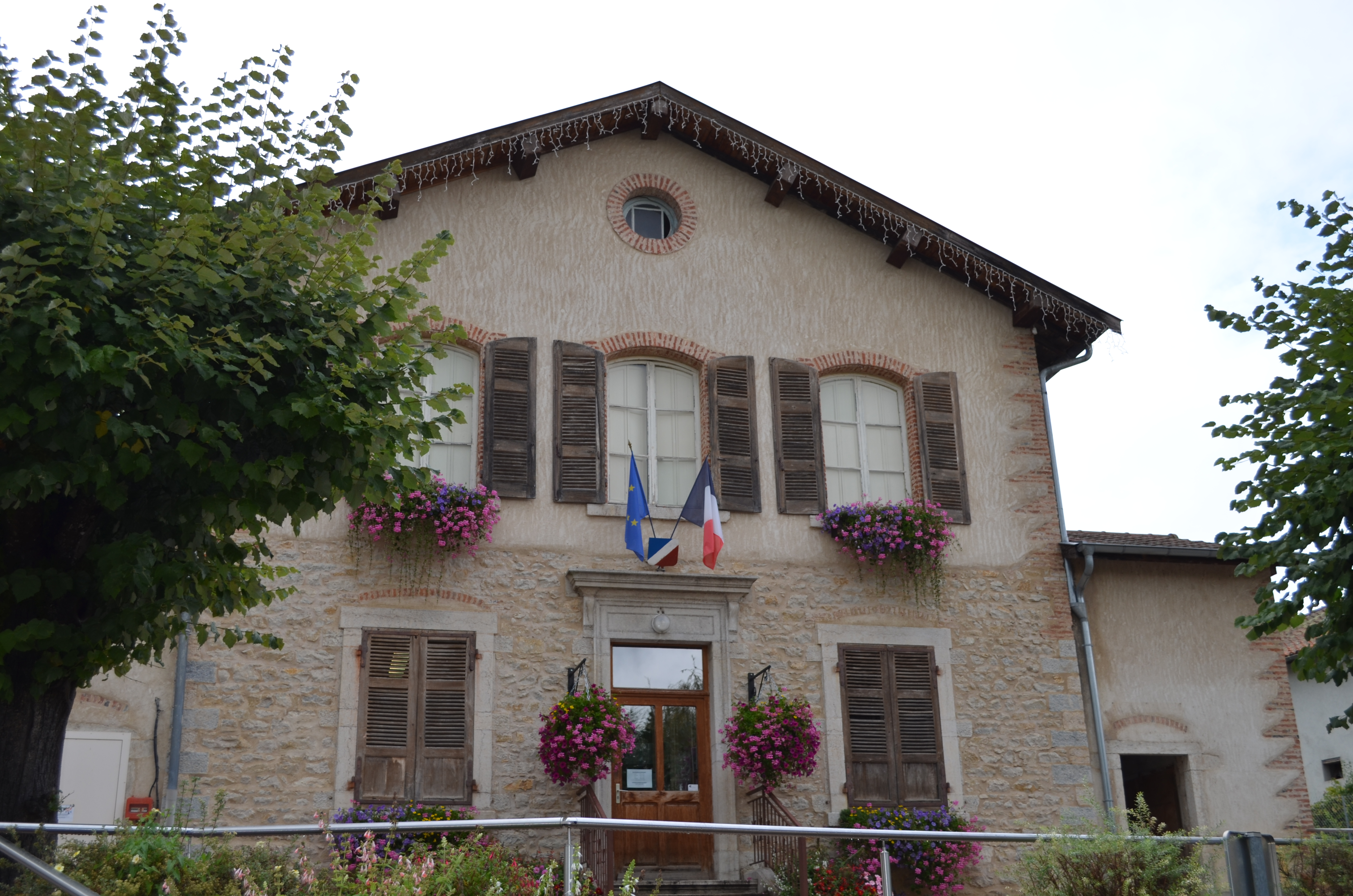
- Town hall

- Coat of arms
- Location of Villette-sur-Ain
- Location within France Location within Auvergne-Rhône-Alpes
- Coordinates: 45°59′14″N 5°16′06″E
- Country: France
- Region: Auvergne-Rhône-Alpes
- Department: Ain
- Arrondissement: Bourg-en-Bresse
- Canton: Ceyzériat

Government
  - Mayor (2020–2026): Jean-Pierre Humbert
- Area^{1}: 19.38 km^{2} (7.48 sq mi)
- Elevation: 235 m (771 ft)
- Highest elevation: 331 m (1,086 ft)
- Lowest elevation: 222 m (728 ft)
- Population (2023): 780
  - Density: 40/km^{2} (100/sq mi)
- Time zone: UTC+01:00 (CET)
  - Summer (DST): UTC+02:00 (CEST)
- INSEE/Postal code: 01449 /01320
- ^{1} French Land Register data, which excludes lakes, ponds, glaciers > 1 km^{2} (0.386 sq mi or 247 acres) and river estuaries.

Villette-sur-Ain (French pronunciation: [vilɛt syʁ ɛ̃], literally Villette on Ain, before 1991: Villette) is a commune in the Ain department in eastern France. It is located on the banks of the Ain river in the Rhône-Alpes region. Villette-sur-Ain is part of the Dombes and is about 45 km from Lyon.

== Population ==
Historical population
| Year | Pop. | ±% p.a. |
|---|---|---|
| 1968 | 287 | — |
| 1975 | 341 | +2.49% |
| 1982 | 381 | +1.60% |
| 1990 | 412 | +0.98% |
| 1999 | 472 | +1.52% |
| 2007 | 656 | +4.20% |
| 2012 | 669 | +0.39% |
| 2017 | 755 | +2.45% |
| 2023 | 780 | +0.54% |
Source: INSEE

== See also ==
- Communes of the Ain department
