= Versailleux =

Commune in Auvergne-Rhône-Alpes, France

Versailleux Vèrsalyô (Arpitan)
- Commune
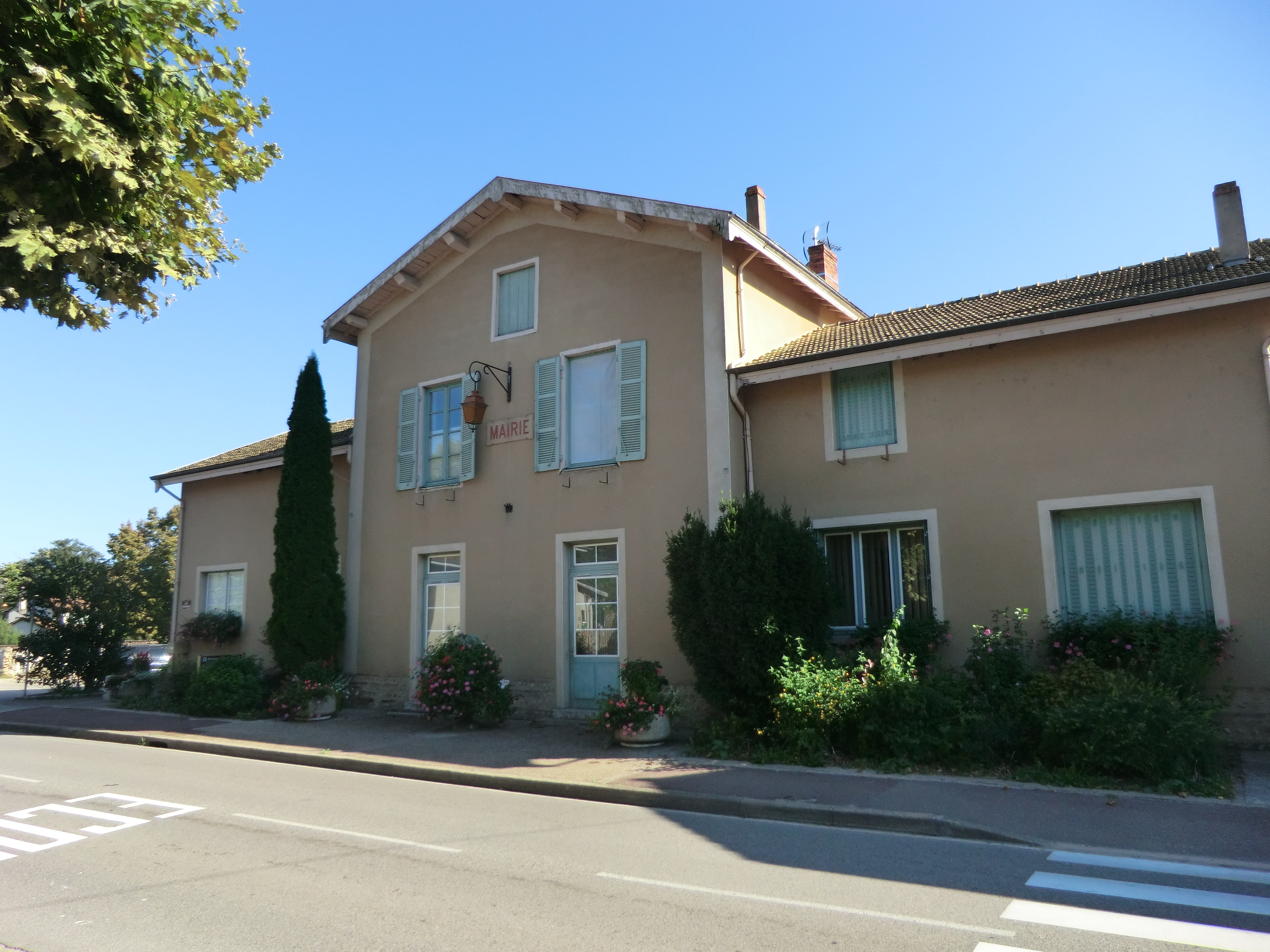
- Town hall
- Location of Versailleux
- Location within France Location within Auvergne-Rhône-Alpes
- Coordinates: 45°58′52″N 5°06′16″E
- Country: France
- Region: Auvergne-Rhône-Alpes
- Department: Ain
- Arrondissement: Bourg-en-Bresse
- Canton: Ceyzériat
- Intercommunality: CC de la Dombes

Government
  - Mayor (2026–32): Gérard Branchy
- Area^{1}: 18.78 km^{2} (7.25 sq mi)
- Elevation: 286 m (938 ft)
- Highest elevation: 303 m (994 ft)
- Lowest elevation: 274 m (899 ft)
- Population (2023): 497
  - Density: 26.5/km^{2} (68.5/sq mi)
- Time zone: UTC+01:00 (CET)
  - Summer (DST): UTC+02:00 (CEST)
- INSEE/Postal code: 01434 /01330
- ^{1} French Land Register data, which excludes lakes, ponds, glaciers > 1 km^{2} (0.386 sq mi or 247 acres) and river estuaries.

Versailleux (French pronunciation: [vɛʁsajø]; Arpitan: Vèrsalyô [var.sa.ˈʎy]) is a commune in the Ain department in eastern France.

On 23 February 2006 during the epidemic of avian influenza, a great number of turkeys died in a breeding of 11,000 animals, probably because of the virus H5N1. The turkeys had never left it because the breeding was confined. The commune of Joyeux, in which the first French case was detected on 13 February, is located a few kilometres south.

== Population ==
Historical population
Year	Pop.	±% p.a.
1968	205	—
1975	198	−0.50%
1982	210	+0.84%
1990	219	+0.53%
1999	255	+1.71%
2007	328	+3.20%
2012	354	+1.54%
2017	438	+4.35%
2023	497	+2.13%
Source: INSEE

== See also ==
- Dombes
- Communes of the Ain department
