= Society of the Atonement =

Religious institutes in the Catholic Church

The Society of the Atonement, also known as the Friars and Sisters of the Atonement or Graymoor Friars and Sisters, is a Franciscan religious congregation in the Catholic Church. The friars and sisters were founded in 1898 by Paul Wattson and Lurana White as a religious community in the Episcopal Church. The religious order is dedicated to the Blessed Virgin Mary under the Marian title of Our Lady of Atonement.

== History ==
=== Lewis T. Wattson ===
Lewis Thomas Wattson, called Father Paul Wattson, was born in Millington, Maryland, on January 16, 1863, to Joseph Newton Wattson and his wife, Mary Electa. Joseph Wattson, a former Presbyterian, was an Episcopalian minister. Lewis received his B.A. (1882) and his M.A. (1885) from St. Stephen's College, Annandale-on-Hudson, New York. He was ordained to the diaconate in 1885, and by special dispensation, at the age of twenty-three, he was made a presbyter. Wattson was graduated with a Bachelor of Divinity from the General Theological Seminary in New York City in 1887. After serving for a time in Port Deposit, Maryland, he became a popular preacher in the New York and New Jersey area and became rector of St. John's Episcopal Church in Kingston, New York. In 1891, he established the Church of the Holy Cross Church as a mission of St. John's, to serve working-class families living near the West Shore Railroad. Holy Cross had a more Anglo-Catholic tradition and a particular mission to the poor. Wattson resigned the rectorship in Kingston to accept a position as superior of an Episcopal mission in Omaha.

=== Lurana Mary White ===
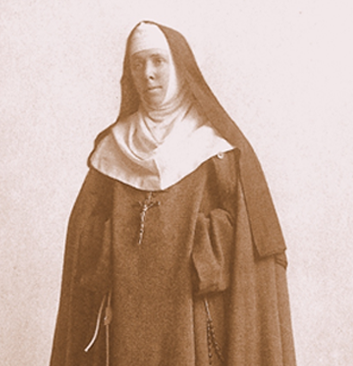
Lurana White

Lurana Mary White was born in New York City on April 12, 1870. On October 17, 1894, she became a postulant in the Episcopal community of the Sisters of the Holy Child Jesus in Albany, New York, where she made her vows on September 25, 1896. That same year, White began corresponding with Wattson, whom she had heard was "very High Church". Wattson was at the time the superior of a small community of Episcopal priests in Omaha. Both were part of the Anglo-Catholic tradition, whose catalyst was the Oxford Movement, which had developed in the Church of England in the early 19th century. White asked Wattson's help in finding an Episcopal community of religious which practised corporate poverty in the Catholic Franciscan tradition. Wattson was unaware of any such community, but began corresponding with her regarding his desire to see the Anglican and Catholic Churches reunited under the leadership of the Bishop of Rome.

In October 1898, White and Wattson met at her family's home in Warwick, New York, and made a spiritual covenant to form a new religious community with the aim of re-establishing Franciscan life in the Anglican Communion. The name of the new community was inspired by a passage in the Epistle to the Romans (Romans 5:11), which, in the King James Version of the Bible, speaks of the atonement Christians have received through Jesus. Wattson chose to interpret the word "atonement" in the literal sense of "at-one-ment," out of his vision that his new community should have the aim of leading all Christians to unity (oneness) with one another. To this end, White spent a year in training with the Society of the Sisters of Bethany in Clerkenwell, London. Before her return, she made a pilgrimage to the Basilica of Saint Francis of Assisi.

=== St. John's in the Wilderness ===
Albert Zabriskie Gray, rector of St. Philip's Church in the Highlands in Garrison, New York, was already serving St. James' Chapel at Highlands and the Chemical Works on the border with Westchester when he erected the mission Chapel of St. John's in the Wilderness in the southeastern portion of the parish. In 1882, Gray left Garrison to take a position at Racine College. The chapel fell into disuse and disrepair, but the trustees of St. Philip's gave White leave to use it and a nearby farmhouse until a convent should be built.

On December 15, 1898, White and two companions took up residence in the area of Garrison, New York, at a farmhouse near the abandoned chapel of St. John's-in-the-Wilderness. She named the place "Graymoor", combining the names of Gray, who had founded the chapel, with that of a Mr. Moore, who had been a generous supporter of its restoration.

=== Episcopalian establishment ===
Meanwhile Wattson had spent some time at the Anglican Monastery of the Order of the Holy Cross at Westminster, Missouri, to gain some experience of religious life in community. Wattson joined the sisters in the spring of 1899 and took up residence in a paint/carpenter's shed about a mile distant. With the formal establishment of the Society of the Atonement, they embraced religious life in the Episcopal Church. In taking religious vows, White became known as Mother Lurana, while Wattson took the name of Father Paul James Francis. White became head of the Franciscan Sisters of the Atonement, the women's branch of the society; Wattson became superior of the Franciscan Friars of the Atonement. Frederick Joseph Kinsman, third Bishop of Delaware, was chosen as Episcopal Visitor.

The Society preached the primacy of the Roman pontiff, while keeping its Episcopal allegiance, as they worked to realize a corporate reunion between the two bodies. Due to this, the founders and their small number of disciples came to find themselves not only criticised but ostracised by their co-religionists, who saw them as walking an impossible tightrope between the two bodies.

== Reception into the Catholic Church ==
In 1909 both the men's and women's societies chose to seek union with the Holy See and full membership in the Church of Rome. In October 1909, the Vatican took the unprecedented step of accepting the members of the Society as a corporate body, allowing the Friars and Sisters to remain in their established way of life.

Now in union with the Bishop of Rome, the Friars of the Atonement continued their work of advocating the reconciliation and eventual reunion of the various Christian denominations with the Pope as spiritual leader, known as ecumenism. A major part of this effort was the Octave of Christian Unity, an eight-day period of prayer for the various segments of Christianity. The Octave runs January 18–25, starting on the date that—at the time—marked the Feast of the Chair of Saint Peter at Rome, and ending on the Feast of the Conversion of Saint Paul. This period is now known as the Week of Prayer for Christian Unity and is celebrated by many Christian denominations.

== Past activities ==
From 1903 to 1973, the Society of the Atonement published The Lamp, a monthly magazine devoted to Christian unity and missionary work.

In England the Friars used to run the Catholic Central Library (now known as the Catholic National Library), situated in the vicinities of Westminster Cathedral, London, before its move to the small town of Farnborough, Hampshire, southwest of London.

== Present-day activities ==
The friars continue their focus on ecumenical work and church unity. In this many serve as resource people to dioceses throughout the world. Their motherhouse continues to be at Graymoor in the United States, but they have houses in Brazil, Canada, Italy, Japan, and the Philippines. One has closed in recent years in the United Kingdom. Founded as a preaching and missionary order, the Friars operate parishes in the United States and Canada, retreat and reconciliation ministries, chaplaincies, special ministry to alcoholics, and the kinds of direct service to the poor that Franciscans are normally engaged in.

The Franciscan Sisters of the Atonement have established catechetical and daycare centers all over North America, serving rural communities throughout the western United States and Canada, as well as inner city locales, such as Harlem in New York City. Several accompanied the Japanese-American communities they served into the forced resettlement conducted during World War II. Today, the Sisters serve in the United States, Canada, Italy, Japan, Brazil and the Philippines.

Cardinal Timothy Dolan of the Archdiocese of New York formally opened the Cause for Canonization of Wattson on Tuesday, September 22, 2015, in New York City. The Father Paul of Graymoor Guild was established in 2016 as a central information source about the status of the cause for Wattson's canonization. In March 2017, the diocesan phase of the process was closed, and Wattson's collected writings were forwarded to the Congregation for the Causes of Saints in Rome.

The friars sponsor the Graymoor Ecumenical & Interreligious Institute, which has offices in the Interchurch Center at 475 Riverside Drive in New York. This institute publishes a monthly newsletter called Ecumenical Trends which is available by subscription in print and online forms.

== See also ==
- Kathleen O'Melia (1869–1939), English missionary to Vancouver and member of the Society
