= Crans, Ain =

Commune in Auvergne-Rhône-Alpes, France

Crans
- Commune
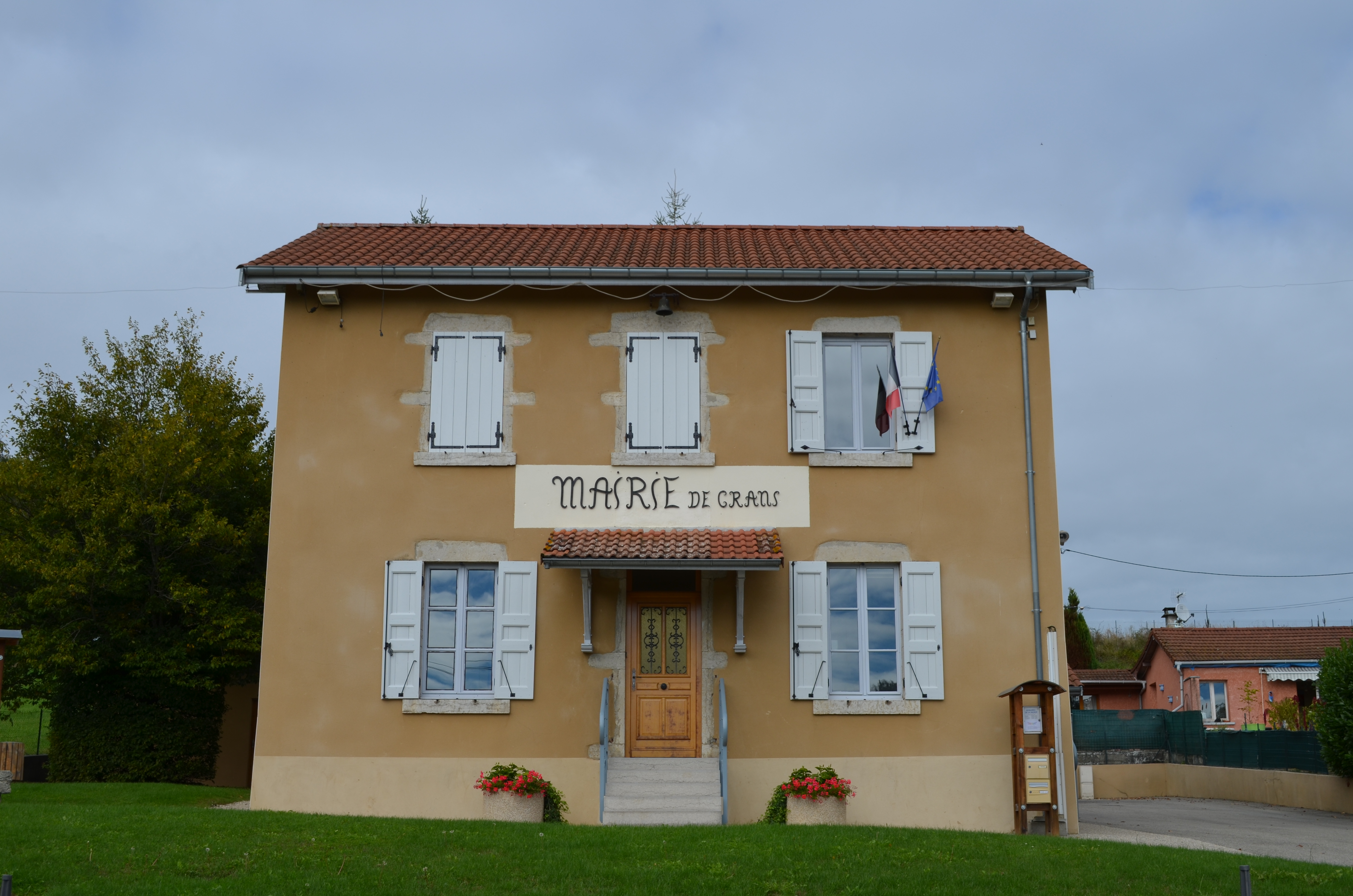
- Town hall
- Location of Crans
- Location within France Location within Auvergne-Rhône-Alpes
- Coordinates: 45°57′56″N 5°11′29″E
- Country: France
- Region: Auvergne-Rhône-Alpes
- Department: Ain
- Arrondissement: Bourg-en-Bresse
- Canton: Ceyzériat

Government
  - Mayor (2026–32): Françoise Mortreux
- Area^{1}: 13.23 km^{2} (5.11 sq mi)
- Highest elevation: 322 m (1,056 ft)
- Lowest elevation: 249 m (817 ft)
- Population (2023): 326
  - Density: 24.6/km^{2} (63.8/sq mi)
- Time zone: UTC+01:00 (CET)
  - Summer (DST): UTC+02:00 (CEST)
- INSEE/Postal code: 01129 /01320
- ^{1} French Land Register data, which excludes lakes, ponds, glaciers > 1 km^{2} (0.386 sq mi or 247 acres) and river estuaries.

Crans (French pronunciation: [kʁɑ̃]; Arpitan: Crant) is a commune in the Ain department in eastern France, specifically the Auvergne-Rhône-Alpes region.

== Population ==
Historical population
Year	Pop.	±% p.a.
1968	119	—
1975	120	+0.12%
1982	145	+2.74%
1990	209	+4.68%
1999	258	+2.37%
2007	275	+0.80%
2012	263	−0.89%
2017	266	+0.23%
2023	326	+3.45%
Source: INSEE

== See also ==
- Communes of the Ain department
- Dombes
