= Paul Wattson =

American priest (1863-1940)

Servant of God Paul Wattson SA
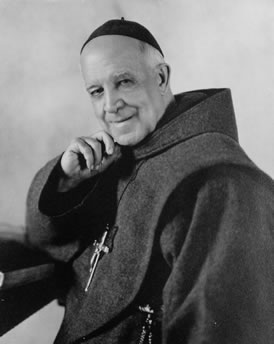

Personal details
- Born: Lewis Thomas Wattson; January 16, 1863 Millington, Maryland, United States
- Died: 8 February 1940 (aged 77) Garrison, New York, United States
- Church: Catholic Church (after 1909); The Episcopal Church (until 1909)
- Ordained: 1910 (Catholic priest); 1886 (Anglican priest)

Paul Wattson, SA (born Lewis Thomas Wattson; January 16, 1863 – February 8, 1940), was an American priest who co-founded the Society of the Atonement with Mother Lurana White, and the Christian Unity Octave in the Episcopal Church. He was later received into the Catholic Church and is remembered as an advocate for ecumenism.

Wattson was ordained an Episcopal priest in 1886. He converted to Catholicism in 1909, and was ordained a Catholic priest in 1910. After his death, Wattson was made a candidate for canonization in 2014 and has thus been named a Servant of God.
