= Canton of Ceyzériat =

Coordinates: 46°10′44″N 5°19′26″E

Ceyzériat
- Canton
- Interactive map of Ceyzériat
- Country: France
- Region: Auvergne-Rhône-Alpes
- Department: Ain
- No. of communes: {{{nbcomm}}}

Government
  - Representatives (2021–2028): Jean-Yves Flochon and Martine Tabouret
- Area: 382.31 km^{2} (147.61 sq mi)
- Population (2023): 27,125
  - Density: 70.950/km^{2} (183.76/sq mi)
- INSEE code: 01 07

The canton of Ceyzériat is an administrative division in eastern France. At the French canton reorganisation which came into effect in March 2015, the canton was expanded from 11 to 22 communes:

1. Certines
2. Ceyzériat
3. Chalamont
4. Châtenay
5. Châtillon-la-Palud
6. Crans
7. Dompierre-sur-Veyle
8. Druillat
9. Journans
10. Lent
11. Montagnat
12. Le Plantay
13. Revonnas
14. Saint-André-sur-Vieux-Jonc
15. Saint-Just
16. Saint-Martin-du-Mont
17. Saint-Nizier-le-Désert
18. Servas
19. Tossiat
20. La Tranclière
21. Versailleux
22. Villette-sur-Ain

== Demographics ==
Historical population
Year	Pop.	±% p.a.
2013	24,922	—
2018	25,961	+0.82%
Source: INSEE

== See also ==
- Cantons of the Ain department
- Communes of France
