= Saint-Nizier-le-Désert =

Commune in Auvergne-Rhône-Alpes, France

- Commune
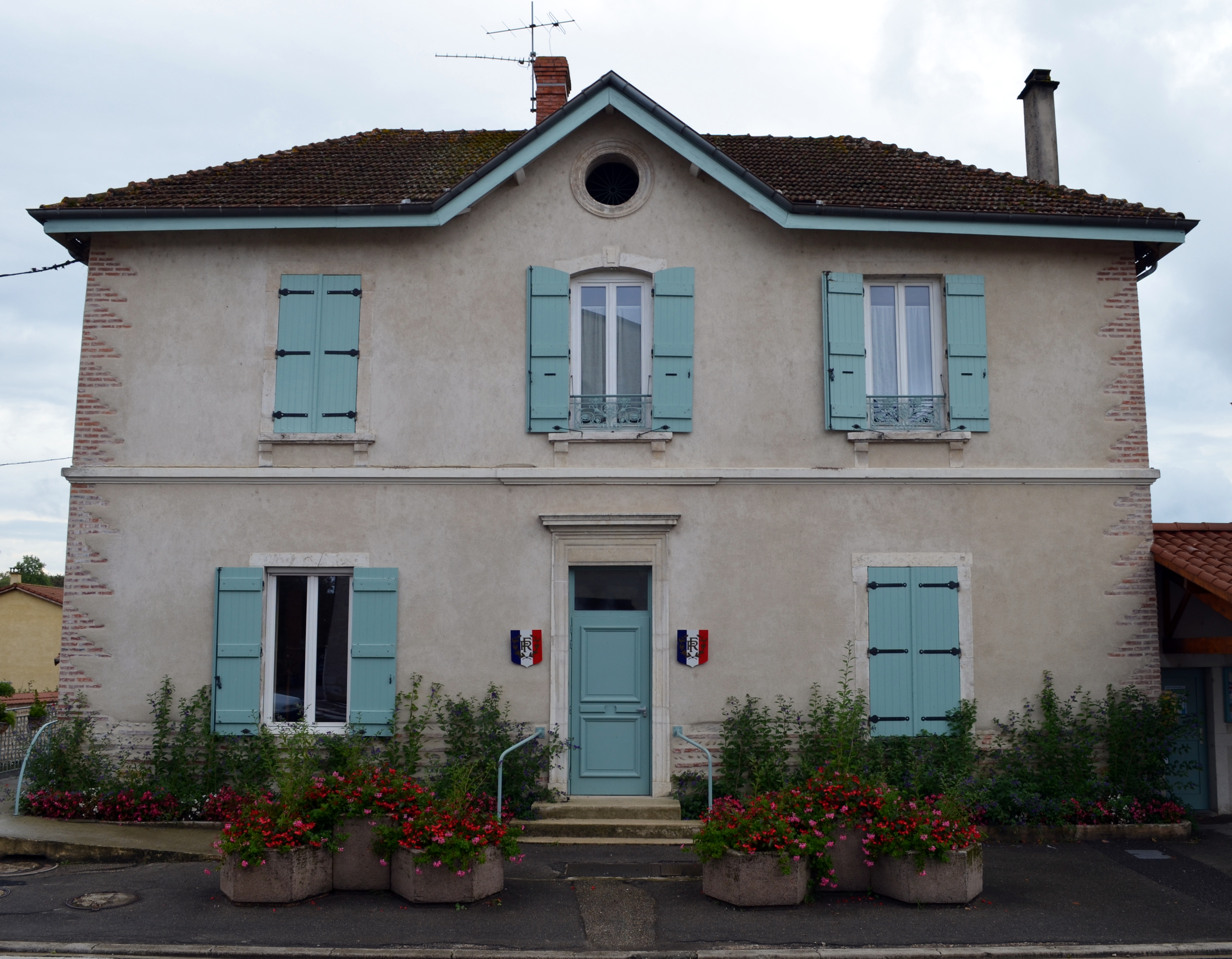
- Town hall
- Location of Saint-Nizier-le-Désert
- Location within France Location within Auvergne-Rhône-Alpes
- Coordinates: 46°03′N 5°09′E
- Country: France
- Region: Auvergne-Rhône-Alpes
- Department: Ain
- Arrondissement: Bourg-en-Bresse
- Canton: Ceyzériat

Government
  - Mayor (2026–32): Jean-Paul Courrier
- Area^{1}: 24.96 km^{2} (9.64 sq mi)
- Elevation: 281 m (922 ft)
- Highest elevation: 323 m (1,060 ft)
- Lowest elevation: 268 m (879 ft)
- Population (2023): 921
  - Density: 36.9/km^{2} (95.6/sq mi)
- Time zone: UTC+01:00 (CET)
  - Summer (DST): UTC+02:00 (CEST)
- INSEE/Postal code: 01381 /01320
- ^{1} French Land Register data, which excludes lakes, ponds, glaciers > 1 km^{2} (0.386 sq mi or 247 acres) and river estuaries.

Saint-Nizier-le-Désert (French pronunciation: [sɛ̃ nizje lə dezɛʁ]; Arpitan: Sent-Nesiés) is a commune in the Ain department in eastern France.

== Population ==
Historical population
Year	Pop.	±% p.a.
1968	355	—
1975	375	+0.79%
1982	390	+0.56%
1990	484	+2.74%
1999	489	+0.11%
2007	841	+7.01%
2012	889	+1.12%
2017	916	+0.60%
2023	921	+0.09%
Source: INSEE

== See also ==
- Communes of the Ain department
