= Châtenay, Ain =

Commune in Auvergne-Rhône-Alpes, France

Châtenay
- Commune
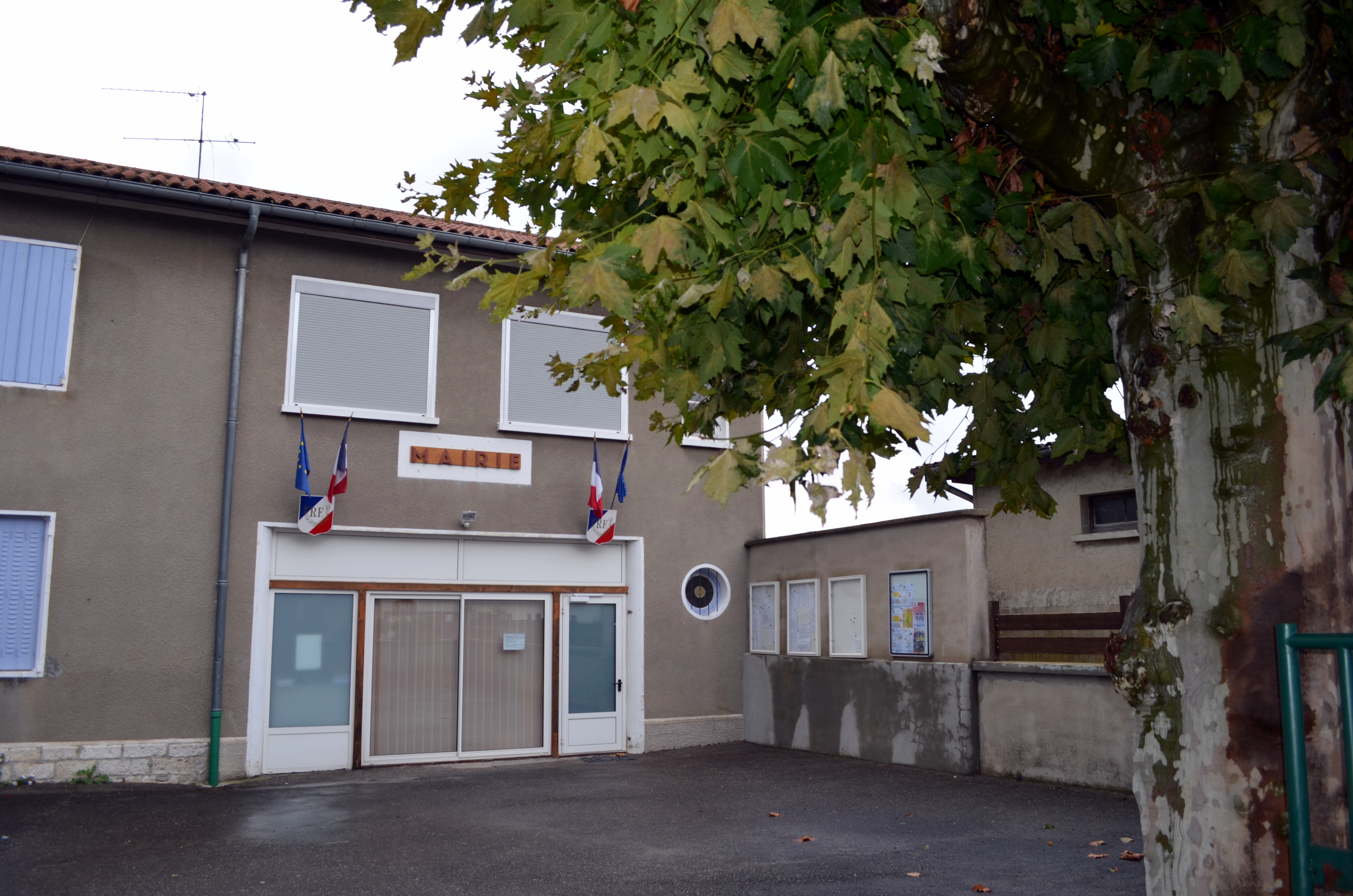
- Town hall
- Location of Châtenay
- Location within France Location within Auvergne-Rhône-Alpes
- Coordinates: 46°02′03″N 5°12′07″E
- Country: France
- Region: Auvergne-Rhône-Alpes
- Department: Ain
- Arrondissement: Bourg-en-Bresse
- Canton: Ceyzériat
- Intercommunality: Dombes

Government
  - Mayor (2026–32): Chrystele Curt
- Area^{1}: 14.95 km^{2} (5.77 sq mi)
- Elevation: 300 m (980 ft)
- Highest elevation: 317 m (1,040 ft)
- Lowest elevation: 272 m (892 ft)
- Population (2023): 373
  - Density: 24.9/km^{2} (64.6/sq mi)
- Time zone: UTC+01:00 (CET)
  - Summer (DST): UTC+02:00 (CEST)
- INSEE/Postal code: 01090 /01320
- ^{1} French Land Register data, which excludes lakes, ponds, glaciers > 1 km^{2} (0.386 sq mi or 247 acres) and river estuaries.

Châtenay (French pronunciation: [ʃatnɛ]) is a commune in the Ain department in eastern France.

== Geography ==
The Veyle flows north through the middle of the commune and forms part of its northern border.

== Population ==
Historical population
Year	Pop.	±% p.a.
1968	249	—
1975	225	−1.44%
1982	266	+2.42%
1990	276	+0.46%
1999	308	+1.23%
2007	336	+1.09%
2012	346	+0.59%
2017	341	−0.29%
2023	373	+1.51%
Source: INSEE

== See also ==
- Communes of the Ain department
- Dombes
