= Le Plantay =

Commune in Auvergne-Rhône-Alpes, France

- Commune
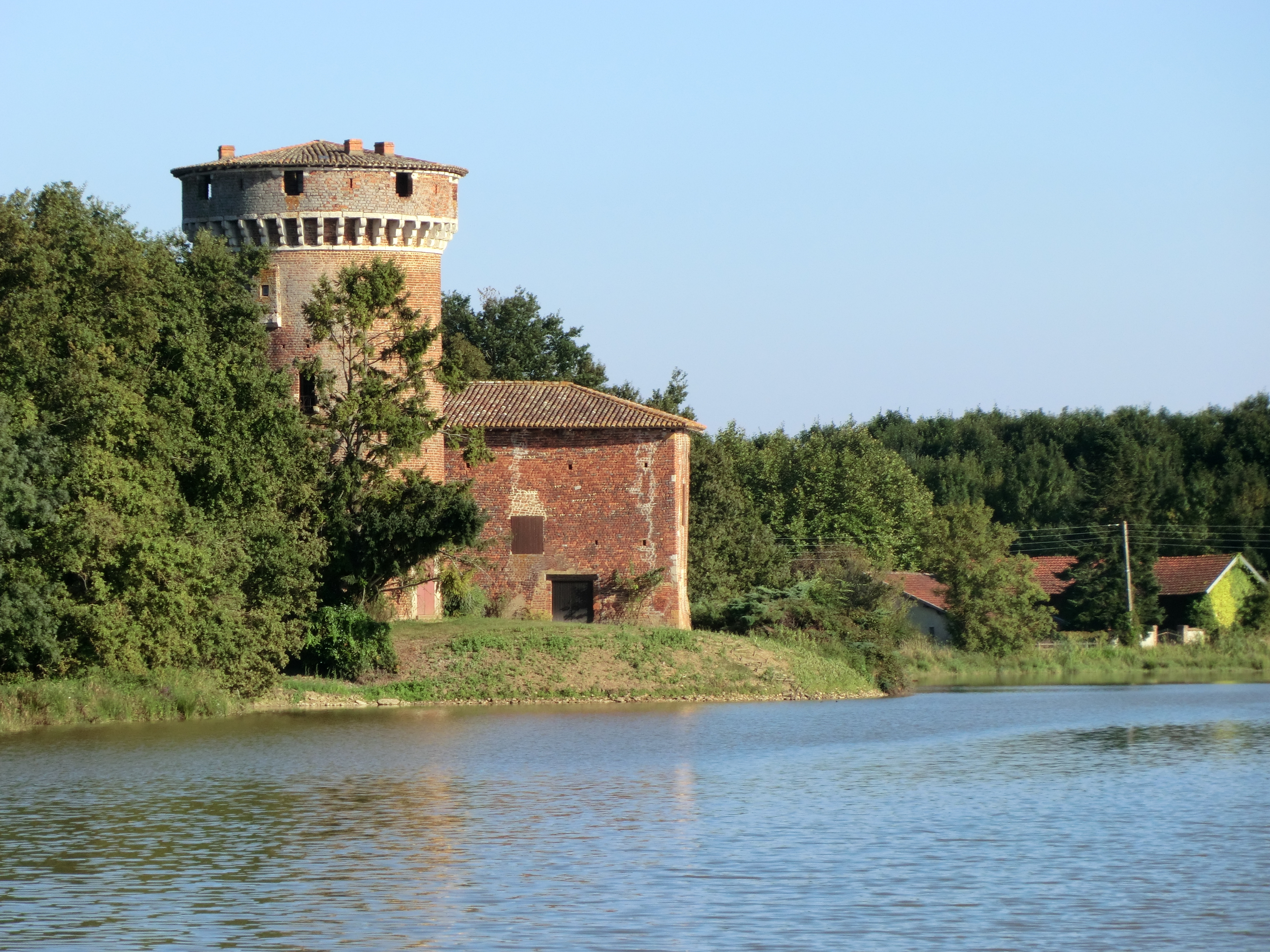
- Château du Plantay

- Coat of arms
- Location of Le Plantay
- Location within France Location within Auvergne-Rhône-Alpes
- Coordinates: 46°01′00″N 5°05′00″E
- Country: France
- Region: Auvergne-Rhône-Alpes
- Department: Ain
- Arrondissement: Bourg-en-Bresse
- Canton: Ceyzériat

Government
  - Mayor (2026–32): Patrick Saroni
- Area^{1}: 19.96 km^{2} (7.71 sq mi)
- Elevation: 275 m (902 ft)
- Highest elevation: 286 m (938 ft)
- Lowest elevation: 267 m (876 ft)
- Population (2023): 559
  - Density: 28.0/km^{2} (72.5/sq mi)
- Time zone: UTC+01:00 (CET)
  - Summer (DST): UTC+02:00 (CEST)
- INSEE/Postal code: 01299 /01330
- ^{1} French Land Register data, which excludes lakes, ponds, glaciers > 1 km^{2} (0.386 sq mi or 247 acres) and river estuaries.

Le Plantay (French pronunciation: [lə plɑ̃tɛ]) is a commune in the Ain department in eastern France.

== Population ==
Historical population
Year	Pop.	±% p.a.
1968	300	—
1975	281	−0.93%
1982	339	+2.72%
1990	344	+0.18%
1999	417	+2.16%
2007	525	+2.92%
2012	532	+0.27%
2017	564	+1.18%
2023	559	−0.15%
Source: INSEE

== Sights ==
The Abbey of Notre-Dame des Dombes, founded by Trappist monks in 1863, is located in the commune.

== See also ==
- Communes of the Ain department
