= Bevy =

Bevy may refer to:

- Bevy, an open source game engine written in Rust
- Collonges-lès-Bévy, a commune in the Côte-d'Or department in eastern France
- Bévy, a commune in the Côte-d'Or department in eastern France
- Bevy Smith
- A group of otters
- A flock of quail

== See also ==
- Bevier (disambiguation)
