= House of Vergy =

Noble french family

Arms of Vergy: Gules three cinquefoils Or. Motto : "J'ai valu, vaux et vaudrai." (Error. This is the motto of House of Vaudrey of région Franche-Comté) War cry : "Vergy" then "Vergy notre daine"

The House of Vergy is one of the oldest French noble families, a cadet dynasty related to the 5th century Merovingian Kingdom of Burgundy, attested since the 9th century.

== Château de Vergy ==
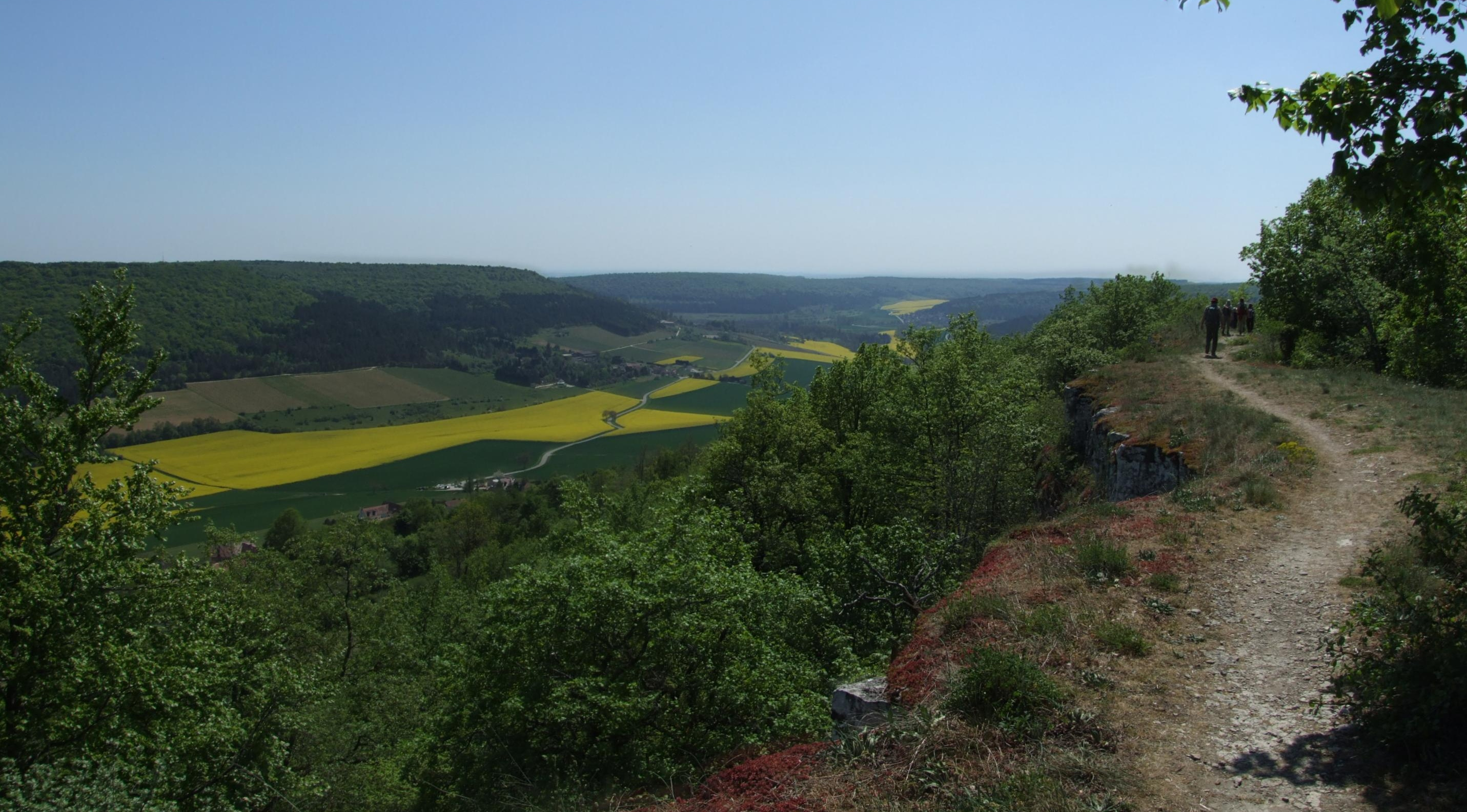
The rocky spur with the ruins of the château de Vergy

The reputedly impregnable Château de Vergy was sited on a rocky spur near Beaune in Burgundy (present-day communes of Reulle-Vergy, L'Étang-Vergy and Curtil-Vergy). The first fort on the site dates to the Roman period. The medieval castle was razed in 1609 and only small traces remain.

== Lords ==
=== 7th century ===
The first known lord of Vergy is Guérin (Warin) de Vergy, brother of saint Leodegar. Guérin was stoned around 681 at the foot of the rocky spur at Vergy, shortly after his brother's martyrdom.

=== First House of Vergy (9th–10th centuries) ===
The first house of Vergy arose in the 9th century with Warin, or Guérin, I of Vergy(760 – >819), who was count of Chalon and count of Mâcon, then count of Auvergne (818).

=== Second House of Vergy (11th–12th centuries) ===
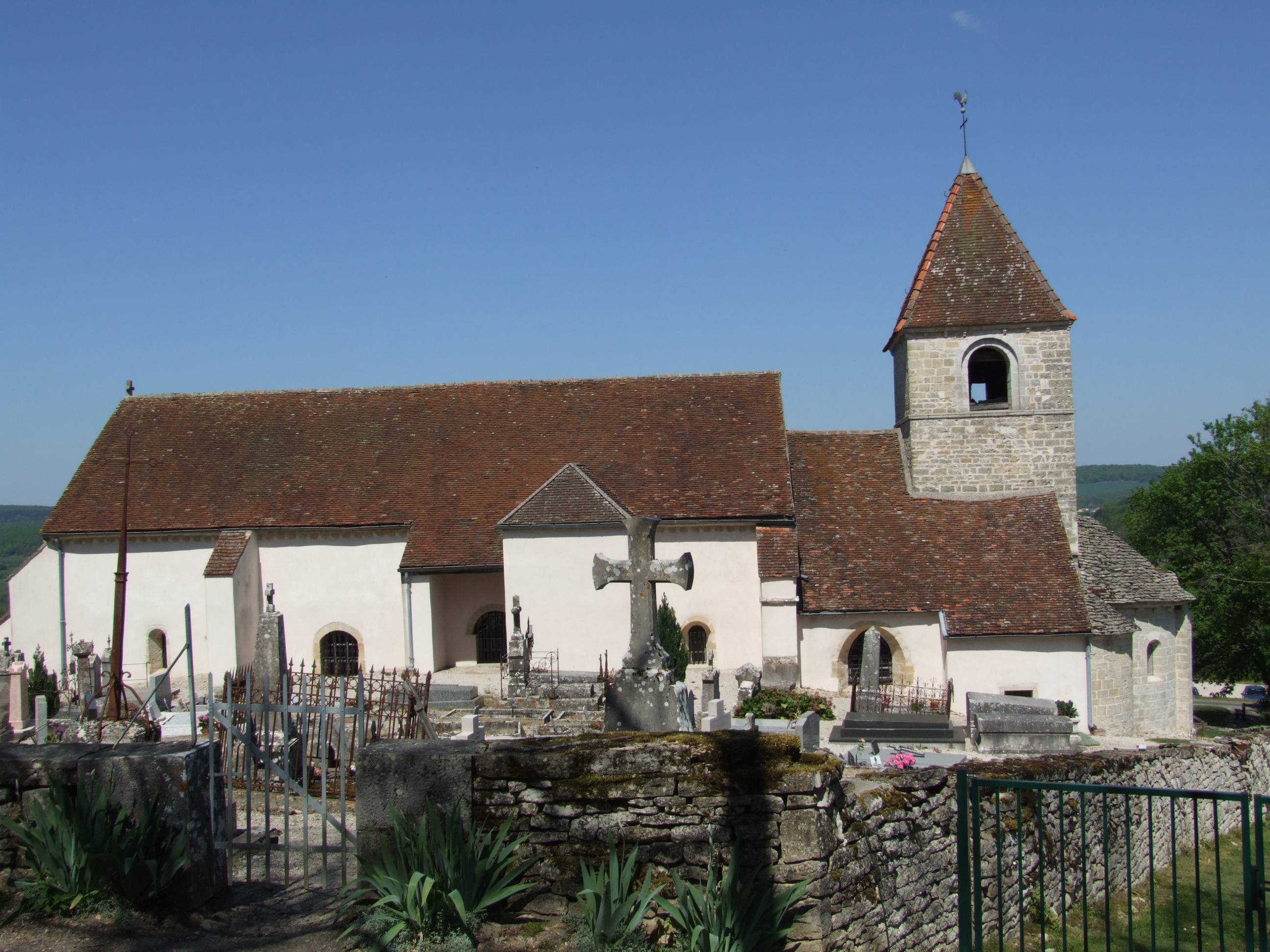
Eglise Saint-Saturnin – entirely 12th century (except the 16th century nave vaults

In the 12th century Vergy was considered one of the most impregnable fortresses in the kingdom by Louis VII of France. Pope Alexander III took refuge there in 1159. It was during this era that the church of Saint-Saturnin was built, still to be seen today.

=== Castle (13th–17th century) ===
With the other Burgundian possessions, Vergy was merged into the royal domains in 1477, on the death of Charles the Bold. The castle was immediately ceded to William IV de Vergy-Autrey by Louis XI. In 1609, following the participation Charles of Lorraine (governor of Burgundy) in the Catholic League from 1589 onwards, Henri IV completely razed the castle. Except for the church of Saint-Saturnin, the burg of Vergy has now entirely disappeared.

== Notable members ==
- Jeanne de Vergy (died 1428)
- Jean III de Vergy (died 1418), seneschal, marshal and governor of the county of Burgundy
- Antoine de Vergy (1375–1439), count of Dammartin, King's chamberlain, marshal of France, Order of the Golden Fleece
- Jean IV de Vergy (died 1460/1)
- Pierre-Henri de Treyssac de Vergy (v. 1740 – 1774), writer, pamphleteer and diplomatic agent

Bishops of Autun :

- Walo (895–919)
- Hervé (920-c.929)
- Guy de Vergy (1224–1245)

Bishops of Paris :

- Humbert de Vergy (1030–1060), lord of Vergy

Bishops of Mâcon :

- Renaud de Vergy (1185–1197)

Archbishops of Besançon :

- Guillaume de Vergy (1371–1391), made a cardinal in 1391 by Antipope Clement VII, favourite of Charles V of France
- Antoine de Vergy (1528–1541)

== Vergy in medieval literature ==
- La Chastelaine de Vergy : 13th century courtly romance, in octosyllabes, anonymous. Very popular in royal and noble courts, Marguerite de Navarre made a summary of its plot in Heptaméron, printed in 1558. The story recounts the trials of the forbidden love suffered by a knight for the châtelaine of Vergy.
- G. de Montreuil, La violette (or Gérard de Nevers) : in this 13th-century chivalric romance, Gérard de Nevers defends the château de Vergy against another knight

== See also ==
- Reulle-Vergy
- L'Étang-Vergy
- Curtil-Vergy
- Toulon-sur-Arroux
- Count of Champlitte

== Sources ==
- Duchesne, André, Grande Histoire de la Maison de Vergy, Paris, 1625
