= Messanges =

Messanges is the name of the following communes in France:

- Messanges, Côte-d'Or, in the Côte-d'Or department
- Messanges, Landes, in the Landes department
