= Chambœuf =

Chambœuf may refer to the following places in France:

- Chambœuf, Côte-d'Or, a commune in the department of Côte-d'Or
- Chambœuf, Loire, a commune in the department of Loire
