= Ternant =

Ternant may refer to the following places in France:

- Ternant, Charente-Maritime, a commune in the department of Charente-Maritime
- Ternant, Côte-d'Or, a commune in the department of Côte-d'Or
- Ternant, Nièvre, a commune in the department of Nièvre
- Ternant-les-Eaux, a commune in the department of Puy-de-Dôme
