= Quemigny =

Quemigny may refer to several communes in France:

- Quemigny-Poisot, in the Côte-d'Or department
- Quemigny-sur-Seine, in the Côte-d'Or department
