= Antoine de Vergy =

French nobleman of Burgundy

Sir Antoine de Vergy
- Comte
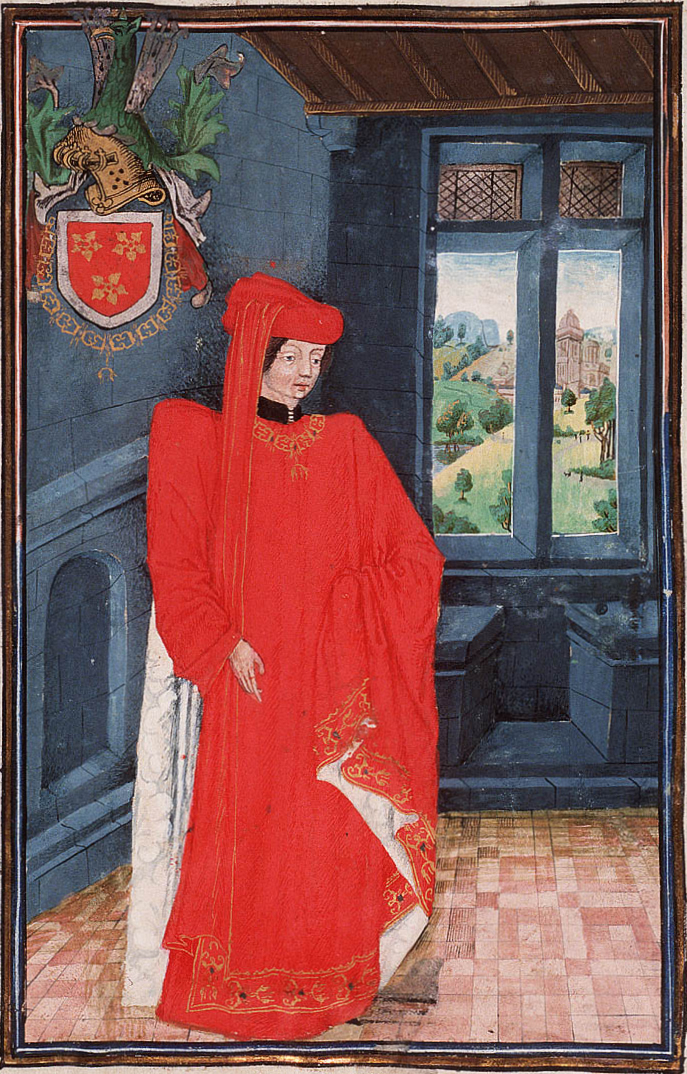

- Coat of arms
- Born: 1375
- Died: October 29, 1439 (aged 63–64)
- Buried: Saint Christopher's Church of Champlitte
- Wars and battles: Hundred Years' War; Battle of Cravant; Battle of Bulgnéville
- Offices: Marshal of France
- Noble family: House of Vergy
- Father: Jean III de Vergy
- Occupation: Military officer

Comte Antoine de Vergy (1375 – October 29, 1439) a prominent French nobleman of Burgundy from the House of Vergy and military commander during the Hundred Years' War. He was the Comte of Dammartin for a short period; Governor of Champagne and Brie; Lord of Champlitte, Rigny, Frolois, Richecourt, and Port-sur-Saône; Marshal of France; and chevalier of the Order of the Golden Fleece.

== Biography ==
Antoine de Vergy was born to Jean III de Vergy of the House of Vergy in 1375. He was also the nephew to the Duke of Lorraine.

In 1417 de Vergy began assisting the Duke of Burgundy, John the Fearless. He joined the Duke in protecting Dauphin, King Charles VII of France, and the Orleanais. He would be made chamberlain to the Duke. On September 19, 1419 de Vergy was among the escort of ten officers who accompanied the Duke across the bridge at Montereau for a supposed diplomatic meeting. The Duke was assassinated there by Tanneguy du Châtel.

=== Siding with England ===
In the wake of the assassination, de Vergy's hand was injured and he was arrested by the Dauphin's men. Following his release, he was appointed Marshal of France by King Henry V of England, by letters dated January 22, 1421.

Following his appointment as Marshal, de Vergy would engage in several military actions. He besieged and captured St. Dizier in 1422, successfully fighting off La Hire's attempt to lift the siege. He would also contribute to the victory against the French at the Battle of Cravant in 1423.

In 1427 King Henry VI of England named de Vergy Count of Dammartin, granting him lands that had been confiscated in 1425 from Renaud de Nanteuil who had sided with the Dauphin. This added to his roles as Captain of Monteclair and Governor of Champagne and Brie. On August 22, 1427 King Henry VI charged de Vergy with recovering Vaucouleurs from the French as a duty incumbent upon the governor of Champagne.

In July of 1428 de Vergy led a force of Anglo-Burgundians targeting Domrémy, the home of Joan of Arc. They pillaged the town, while setting fire to it and the church.

In 1430 Duke Philip the Good, son and successor of John the Fearless, created the Order of the Golden Fleece in Bruges on the occasion of his marriage to Isabella of Portugal; Antoine de Vergy was the fifth of the twenty-four knights to receive the collar of this order at its founding. That same year, King Charles VII of France recaptured Dammartin and gave the County to Marguerite de Nanteuil.

When Guillaume de Châteauvillain defected against the Burgundians, a rivalry would emerge between the turncoat and Jean IV de Vergy. This rivalry came to a head when the Abbey of Theuley, under the protection of Antoine de Vergy, was sacked by de Châteauvillain's men in May of 1431. Antoine de Vergy would join forces with his nephews Jean IV and Charles de Vergy. They led a host of 1200 horsemen which besieged, took, and burned de Châteauvillain's castle Chalancey, along with many surrounding towns. Later, de Vergy fought to take Lorraine for the Burgundians against René d'Anjou, Count of Armagnac, and Charles the Count of Maine, brother of Queen Marie. In 1431 de Vergy led a force with his brother Jean de Vergy, a naturalized bastard, at the Battle of Bulgnéville, where René d'Anjou was defeated and taken prisoner.

On October 28, 1439 de Vergy passed on the lordship of Richecourt to his naturalized brother Jean, but his other fiefs went to his nephews. Antoine de Vergy died the next day, on October 29, 1439. Antoine de Vergy had no children by neither his first wife, Jeane of Rigney, who had died before de Vergy, nor his second wife, Guillemette de Vienne. He was buried at Saint Christopher's Church of Champlitte, which de Vergy ordered built between 1437 and 1439.
