= Clémencey =

- Part of Valforêt
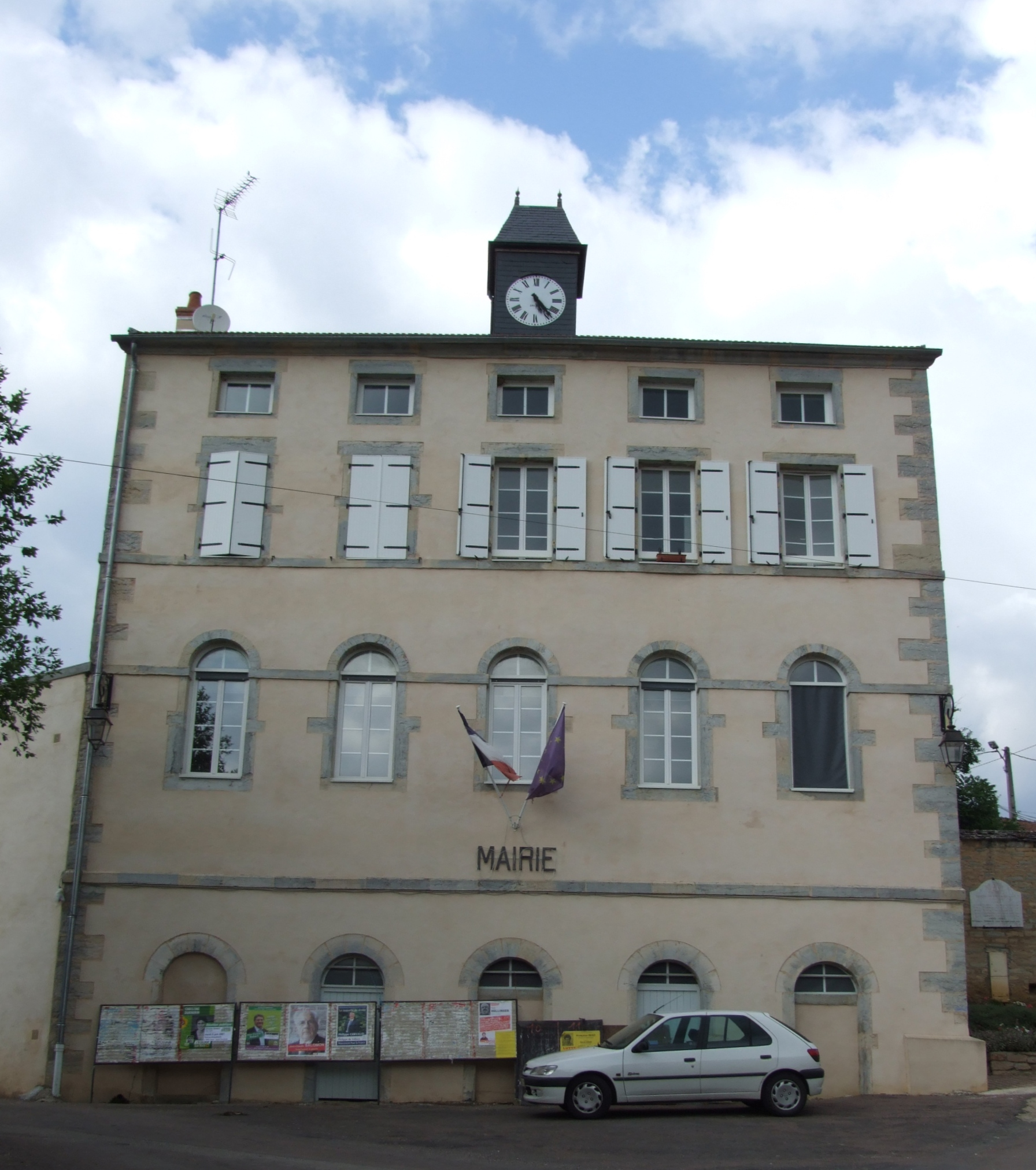
- Town hall

- Coat of arms
- Location of Clémencey
- Location within France Location within Bourgogne-Franche-Comté
- Coordinates: 47°14′53″N 4°52′59″E
- Country: France
- Region: Bourgogne-Franche-Comté
- Department: Côte-d'Or
- Arrondissement: Beaune
- Canton: Longvic
- Commune: Valforêt
- Area^{1}: 10.72 km^{2} (4.14 sq mi)
- Highest elevation: 579 m (1,900 ft)
- Lowest elevation: 330 m (1,080 ft)
- Population (2019): 120
  - Density: 11/km^{2} (29/sq mi)
- Time zone: UTC+01:00 (CET)
  - Summer (DST): UTC+02:00 (CEST)
- Postal code: 21220
- ^{1} French Land Register data, which excludes lakes, ponds, glaciers > 1 km^{2} (0.386 sq mi or 247 acres) and river estuaries.

Clémencey (French pronunciation: [klemɑ̃sɛ]) is a former commune in the Côte-d'Or department in eastern France. It is located 17 km south west of Dijon. On 1 January 2019, it was merged into the new commune Valforêt.

== See also ==
- Communes of the Côte-d'Or department
