= Bretenière =

- Commune
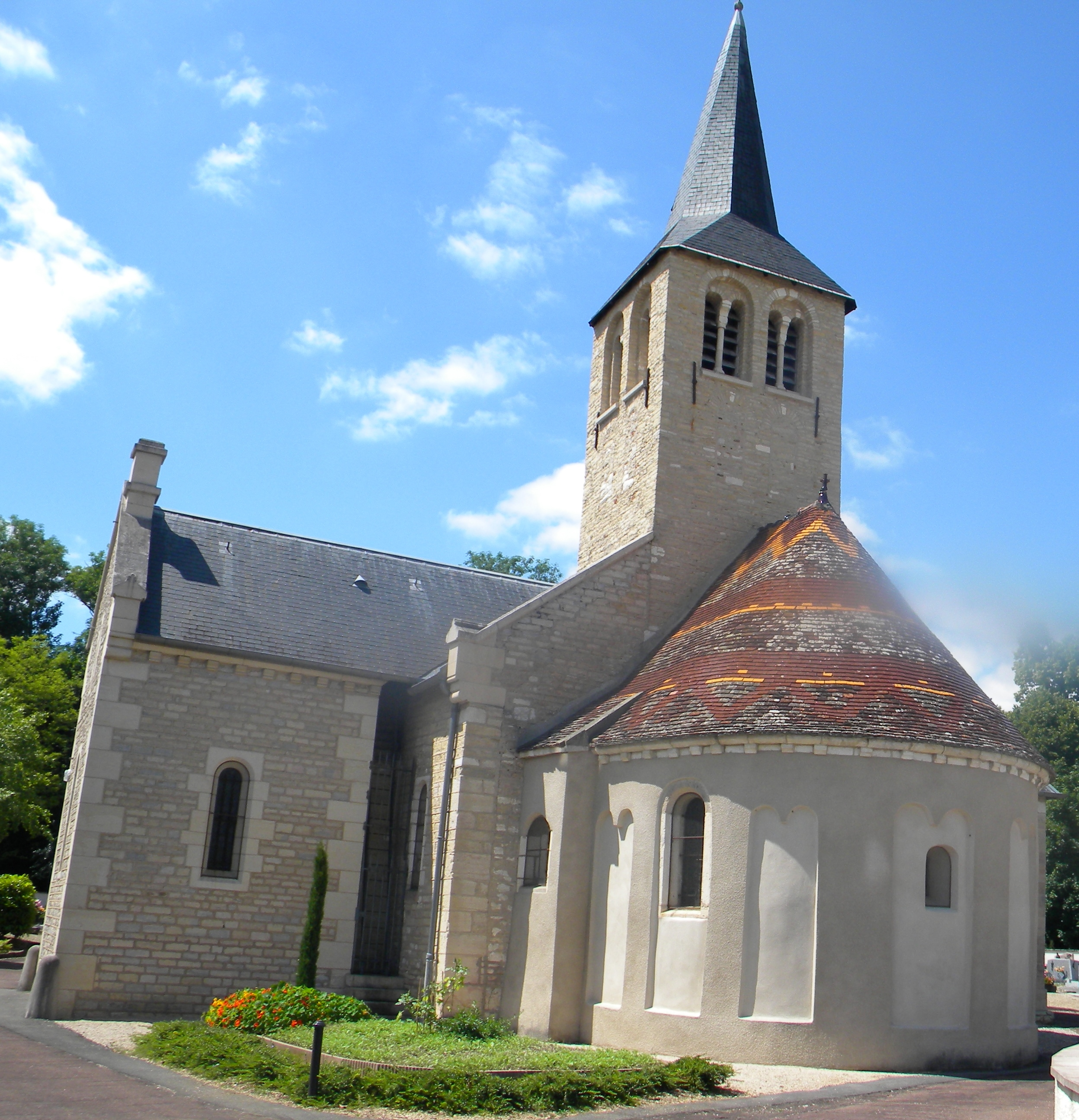
- The church in Bretenière

- Coat of arms
- Location of Bretenière
- Location within France Location within Bourgogne-Franche-Comté
- Coordinates: 47°14′29″N 5°06′54″E
- Country: France
- Region: Bourgogne-Franche-Comté
- Department: Côte-d'Or
- Arrondissement: Dijon
- Canton: Longvic
- Intercommunality: Dijon Métropole

Government
  - Mayor (2020–2026): Nicolas Schoutith
- Area^{1}: 6.03 km^{2} (2.33 sq mi)
- Highest elevation: 215 m (705 ft)
- Lowest elevation: 206 m (676 ft)
- Population (2023): 959
  - Density: 159/km^{2} (412/sq mi)
- Time zone: UTC+01:00 (CET)
  - Summer (DST): UTC+02:00 (CEST)
- INSEE/Postal code: 21106 /21110
- ^{1} French Land Register data, which excludes lakes, ponds, glaciers > 1 km^{2} (0.386 sq mi or 247 acres) and river estuaries.

Bretenière (French pronunciation: [bʁətnjɛʁ]) is a commune in the Côte-d'Or department in eastern France.

== Geography ==
=== Climate ===
Bretenière has an oceanic climate (Köppen climate classification Cfb). The average annual temperature in Bretenière is 10.8 °C (51.4 °F). The average annual rainfall is 796.9 mm (31.37 in) with May as the wettest month. The temperatures are highest on average in July, at around 20.1 °C (68.2 °F), and lowest in January, at around 2.0 °C (35.6 °F).

Climate data for Bretenière (1981–2010)
Month	Jan	Feb	Mar	Apr	May	Jun	Jul	Aug	Sep	Oct	Nov	Dec	Year
Mean daily maximum °C (°F)	4.9 (40.8)	7.0 (44.6)	11.7 (53.1)	15.2 (59.4)	19.6 (67.3)	23.3 (73.9)	26.6 (79.9)	25.8 (78.4)	21.2 (70.2)	15.9 (60.6)	9.2 (48.6)	5.5 (41.9)	15.5 (59.9)
Daily mean °C (°F)	2.0 (35.6)	3.3 (37.9)	6.8 (44.2)	9.9 (49.8)	14.2 (57.6)	17.4 (63.3)	20.1 (68.2)	19.7 (67.5)	15.8 (60.4)	11.6 (52.9)	5.9 (42.6)	2.9 (37.2)	10.8 (51.4)
Mean daily minimum °C (°F)	−0.8 (30.6)	−0.4 (31.3)	2.0 (35.6)	4.5 (40.1)	8.7 (47.7)	11.5 (52.7)	13.7 (56.7)	13.6 (56.5)	10.3 (50.5)	7.2 (45.0)	2.7 (36.9)	0.3 (32.5)	6.1 (43.0)
Average precipitation mm (inches)	57.2 (2.25)	44.5 (1.75)	49.3 (1.94)	60.1 (2.37)	95.7 (3.77)	74.3 (2.93)	65.8 (2.59)	66.6 (2.62)	69.1 (2.72)	75.3 (2.96)	75.9 (2.99)	63.1 (2.48)	796.9 (31.37)
Average precipitation days (≥ 1.0 mm)	11.1	9.4	10.1	10.0	11.6	9.3	8.3	8.4	8.6	10.4	11.5	11.4	120.1
Source: Météo France

== Population ==
Historical population
Year	Pop.	±% p.a.
1968	436	—
1975	446	+0.32%
1982	513	+2.02%
1990	675	+3.49%
1999	776	+1.56%
2007	742	−0.56%
2012	781	+1.03%
2017	913	+3.17%
2023	959	+0.82%
Source: INSEE

== See also ==
- Communes of the Côte-d'Or department
