= Semezanges =

- Commune
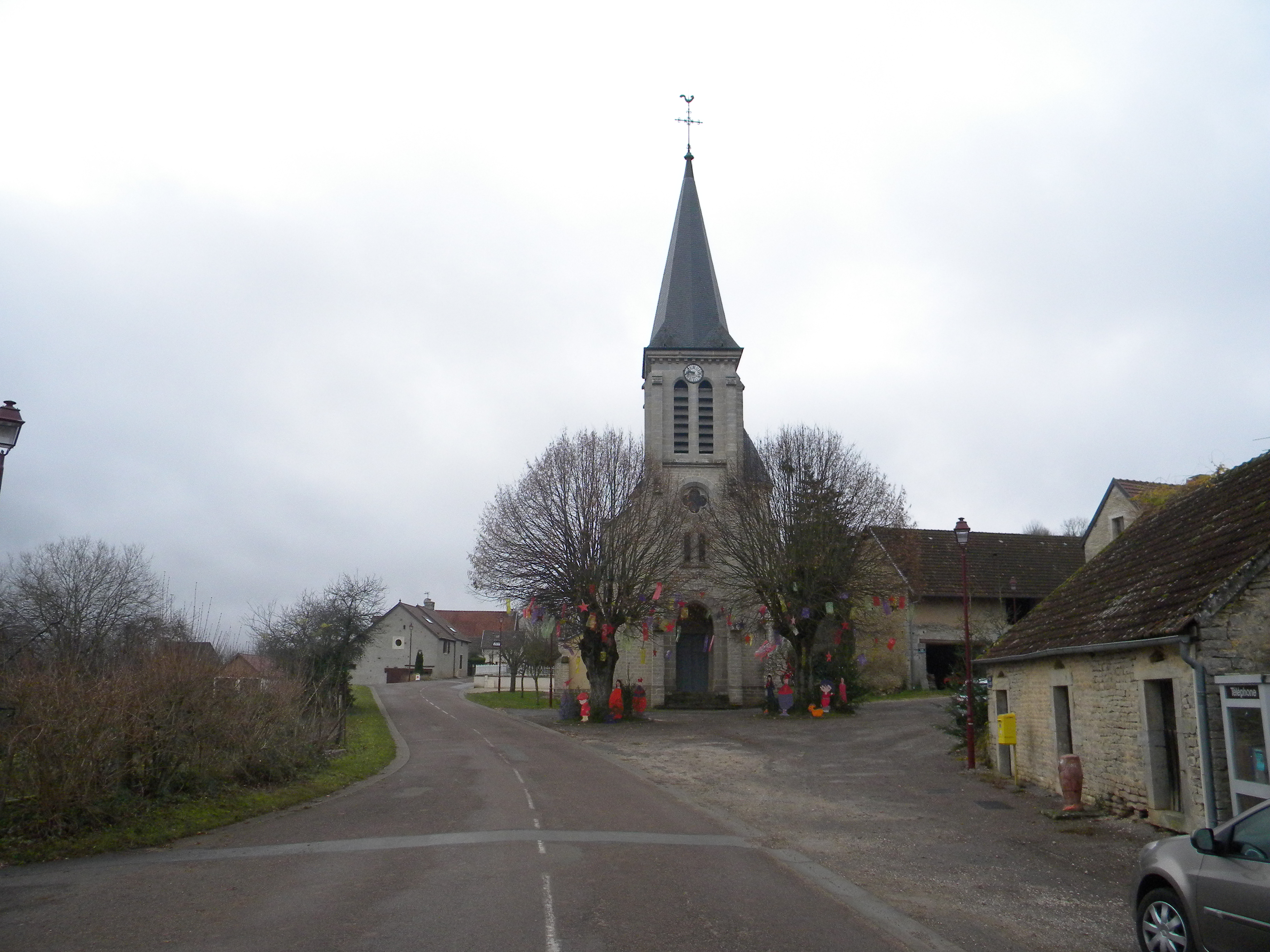
- The church in Semezanges
- Location of Semezanges
- Location within France Location within Bourgogne-Franche-Comté
- Coordinates: 47°12′57″N 4°51′33″E
- Country: France
- Region: Bourgogne-Franche-Comté
- Department: Côte-d'Or
- Arrondissement: Beaune
- Canton: Longvic
- Intercommunality: Gevrey-Chambertin et Nuits-Saint-Georges

Government
  - Mayor (2020–2026): Alain Trapet
- Area^{1}: 8.14 km^{2} (3.14 sq mi)
- Highest elevation: 596 m (1,955 ft)
- Lowest elevation: 362 m (1,188 ft)
- Population (2023): 100
  - Density: 12/km^{2} (32/sq mi)
- Time zone: UTC+01:00 (CET)
  - Summer (DST): UTC+02:00 (CEST)
- INSEE/Postal code: 21601 /21220
- ^{1} French Land Register data, which excludes lakes, ponds, glaciers > 1 km^{2} (0.386 sq mi or 247 acres) and river estuaries.

Semezanges (French pronunciation: [səmzɑ̃ʒ]) is a commune in the Côte-d'Or department in eastern France.

== Population ==
Historical population
| Year | Pop. | ±% p.a. |
|---|---|---|
| 1968 | 62 | — |
| 1975 | 53 | −2.22% |
| 1982 | 66 | +3.18% |
| 1990 | 95 | +4.66% |
| 1999 | 112 | +1.85% |
| 2007 | 109 | −0.34% |
| 2012 | 98 | −2.11% |
| 2017 | 92 | −1.26% |
| 2023 | 100 | +1.40% |
Source: INSEE

== See also ==
- Communes of the Côte-d'Or department
