= Curley, Côte-d'Or =

Curley
- Commune
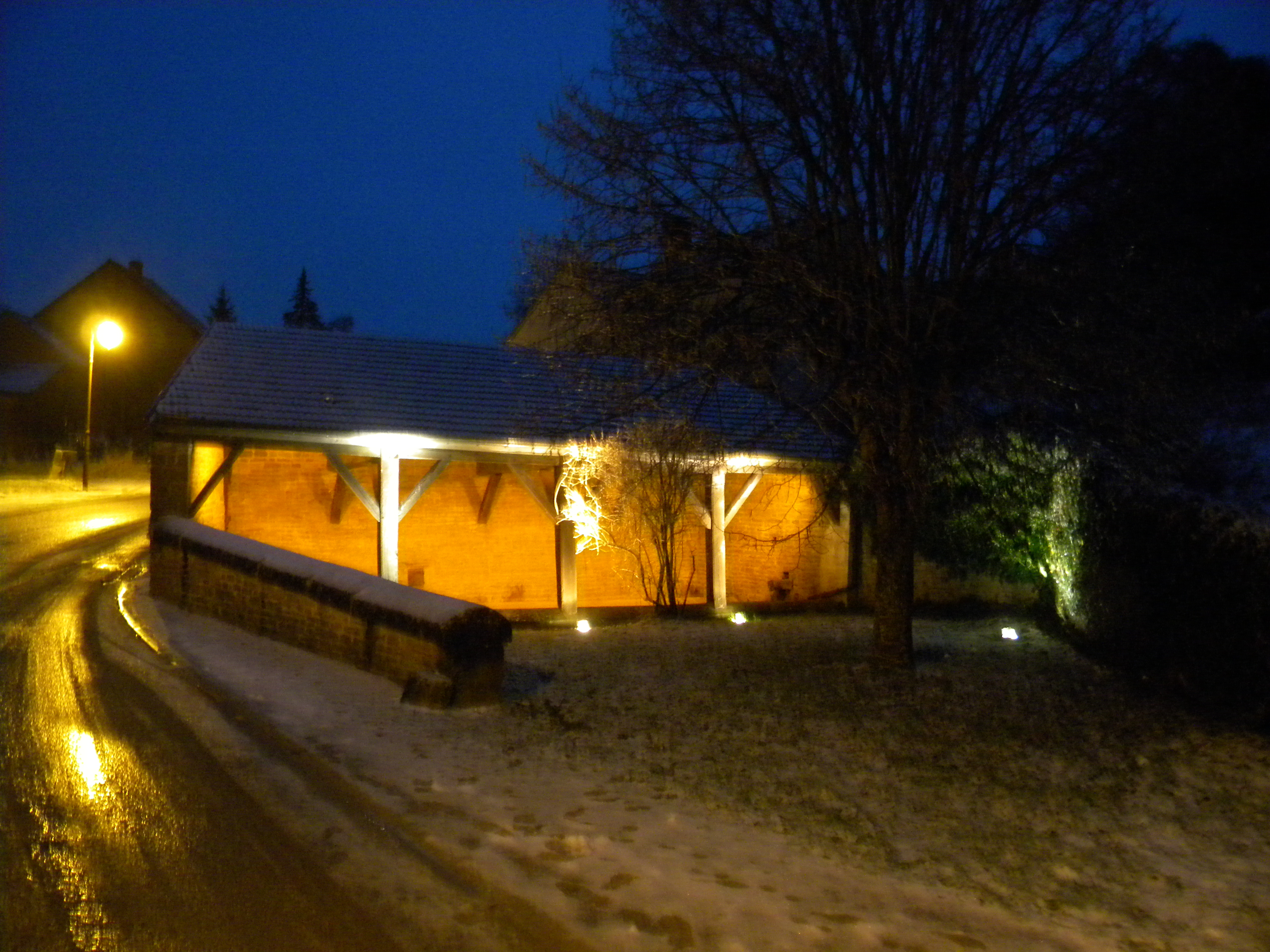
- The washhouse at night

- Coat of arms
- Location of Curley
- Location within France Location within Bourgogne-Franche-Comté
- Coordinates: 47°12′09″N 4°54′23″E
- Country: France
- Region: Bourgogne-Franche-Comté
- Department: Côte-d'Or
- Arrondissement: Beaune
- Canton: Longvic
- Intercommunality: Gevrey-Chambertin et Nuits-Saint-Georges

Government
  - Mayor (2020–2026): Dominique Bailleux
- Area^{1}: 5.75 km^{2} (2.22 sq mi)
- Highest elevation: 528 m (1,732 ft)
- Lowest elevation: 360 m (1,180 ft)
- Population (2023): 142
  - Density: 24.7/km^{2} (64.0/sq mi)
- Time zone: UTC+01:00 (CET)
  - Summer (DST): UTC+02:00 (CEST)
- INSEE/Postal code: 21217 /21220
- ^{1} French Land Register data, which excludes lakes, ponds, glaciers > 1 km^{2} (0.386 sq mi or 247 acres) and river estuaries.

Curley (French pronunciation: [kyʁlɛ]) is a commune in the Côte-d'Or department in eastern France. It is about 15 km southwest of Dijon.

== Population ==
Historical population
Year	Pop.	±% p.a.
1968	24	—
1975	25	+0.58%
1982	56	+12.21%
1990	85	+5.35%
1999	118	+3.71%
2007	141	+2.25%
2012	136	−0.72%
2017	135	−0.15%
2023	142	+0.85%
Source: INSEE

== See also ==
- Communes of the Côte-d'Or department
