= Détain-et-Bruant =

- Commune
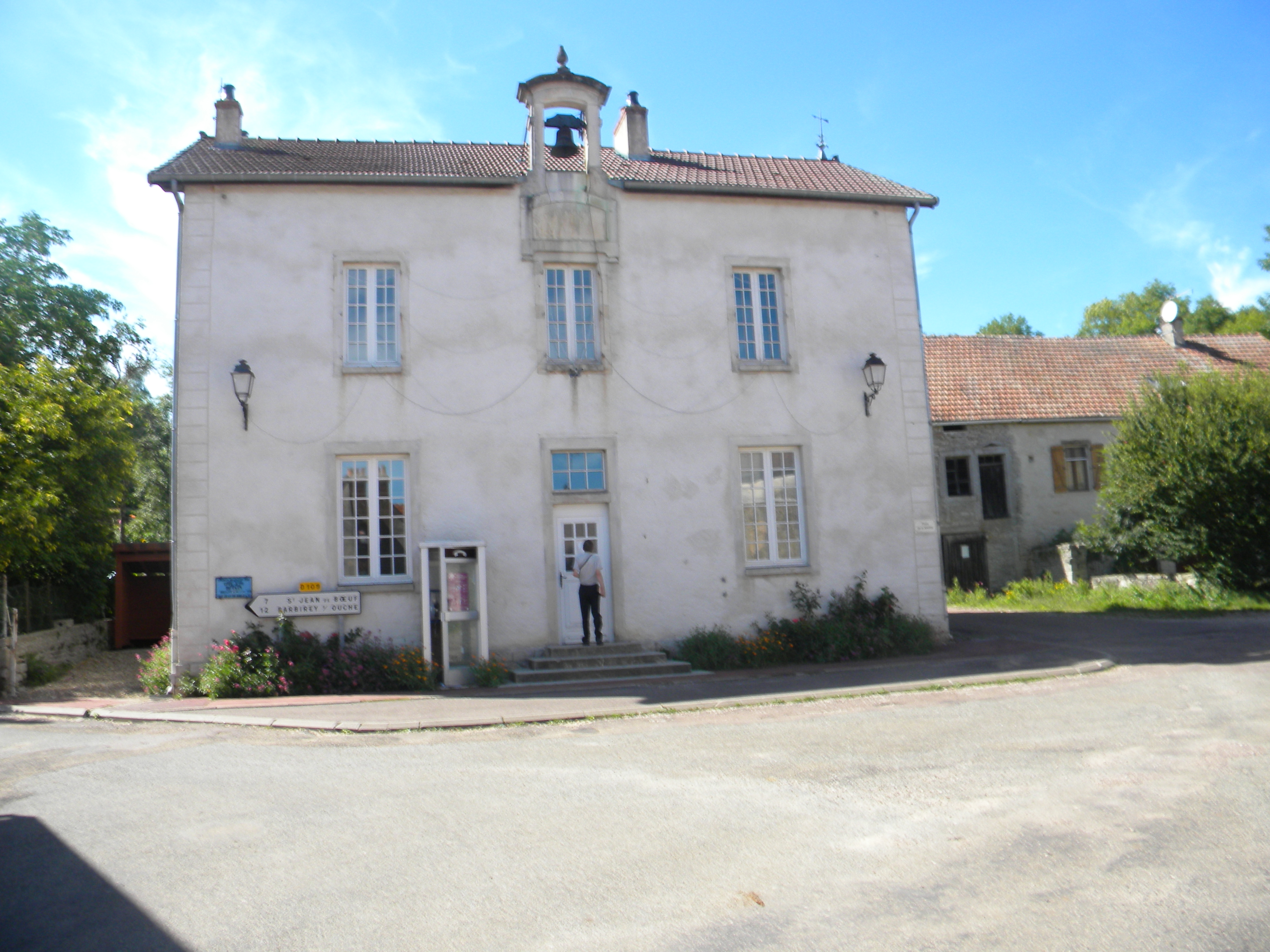
- Town hall
- Location of Détain-et-Bruant
- Location within France Location within Bourgogne-Franche-Comté
- Coordinates: 47°10′24″N 4°47′32″E
- Country: France
- Region: Bourgogne-Franche-Comté
- Department: Côte-d'Or
- Arrondissement: Beaune
- Canton: Longvic

Government
  - Mayor (2022–2026): Sonia Loth
- Area^{1}: 15.48 km^{2} (5.98 sq mi)
- Elevation: 617 m (2,024 ft)
- Highest elevation: 642 m (2,106 ft)
- Lowest elevation: 515 m (1,690 ft)
- Population (2023): 142
  - Density: 9.17/km^{2} (23.8/sq mi)
- Time zone: UTC+01:00 (CET)
  - Summer (DST): UTC+02:00 (CEST)
- INSEE/Postal code: 21228 /21220
- ^{1} French Land Register data, which excludes lakes, ponds, glaciers > 1 km^{2} (0.386 sq mi or 247 acres) and river estuaries.

Détain-et-Bruant (French pronunciation: [detɛ̃ e bʁyɑ̃]) is a commune in the Côte-d'Or department in eastern France.

== Geography ==
=== Climate ===
Détain-et-Bruant has an oceanic climate (Köppen climate classification Cfb). The average annual temperature in Détain-et-Bruant is 9.2 °C (48.6 °F). The average annual rainfall is 1,006.8 mm (39.64 in) with May as the wettest month. The temperatures are highest on average in July, at around 18.1 °C (64.6 °F), and lowest in January, at around 1.2 °C (34.2 °F). The highest temperature ever recorded in Détain-et-Bruant was 35.7 °C (96.3 °F) on 11 August 1998; the coldest temperature ever recorded was −19.7 °C (−3.5 °F) on 12 January 1987.

Climate data for Détain-et-Bruant (1981–2010 averages, extremes 1973−1999)
Month	Jan	Feb	Mar	Apr	May	Jun	Jul	Aug	Sep	Oct	Nov	Dec	Year
Record high °C (°F)	14.0 (57.2)	19.6 (67.3)	23.0 (73.4)	24.7 (76.5)	28.5 (83.3)	34.2 (93.6)	35.3 (95.5)	35.7 (96.3)	30.0 (86.0)	25.3 (77.5)	21.0 (69.8)	17.0 (62.6)	35.7 (96.3)
Mean daily maximum °C (°F)	4.0 (39.2)	5.2 (41.4)	9.3 (48.7)	12.2 (54.0)	16.7 (62.1)	19.7 (67.5)	23.7 (74.7)	23.3 (73.9)	18.7 (65.7)	13.6 (56.5)	7.8 (46.0)	4.7 (40.5)	13.3 (55.9)
Daily mean °C (°F)	1.2 (34.2)	1.8 (35.2)	5.4 (41.7)	7.7 (45.9)	11.9 (53.4)	14.8 (58.6)	18.1 (64.6)	17.9 (64.2)	14.1 (57.4)	9.9 (49.8)	4.7 (40.5)	2.2 (36.0)	9.2 (48.6)
Mean daily minimum °C (°F)	−1.5 (29.3)	−1.6 (29.1)	1.4 (34.5)	3.2 (37.8)	7.2 (45.0)	9.9 (49.8)	12.5 (54.5)	12.4 (54.3)	9.5 (49.1)	6.2 (43.2)	1.6 (34.9)	−0.4 (31.3)	5.1 (41.2)
Record low °C (°F)	−19.7 (−3.5)	−17.2 (1.0)	−8.7 (16.3)	−8.0 (17.6)	−3.9 (25.0)	2.3 (36.1)	4.6 (40.3)	3.5 (38.3)	0.0 (32.0)	−3.4 (25.9)	−10.0 (14.0)	−12.9 (8.8)	−19.7 (−3.5)
Average precipitation mm (inches)	83.0 (3.27)	71.7 (2.82)	70.4 (2.77)	80.1 (3.15)	97.5 (3.84)	86.2 (3.39)	78.9 (3.11)	74.0 (2.91)	81.9 (3.22)	95.0 (3.74)	96.1 (3.78)	92.0 (3.62)	1,006.8 (39.64)
Average precipitation days (≥ 1.0 mm)	13.0	11.7	11.8	11.4	12.8	10.3	8.9	8.8	9.5	12.0	12.8	13.8	136.8
Source: Meteociel

== Population ==
Historical population
Year	Pop.	±% p.a.
1968	74	—
1975	67	−1.41%
1982	72	+1.03%
1990	91	+2.97%
1999	107	+1.82%
2007	115	+0.91%
2012	153	+5.88%
2017	141	−1.62%
2023	142	+0.12%
Source: INSEE

== See also ==
- Communes of the Côte-d'Or department
