= Chevannes, Côte-d'Or =

Chevannes
- Commune
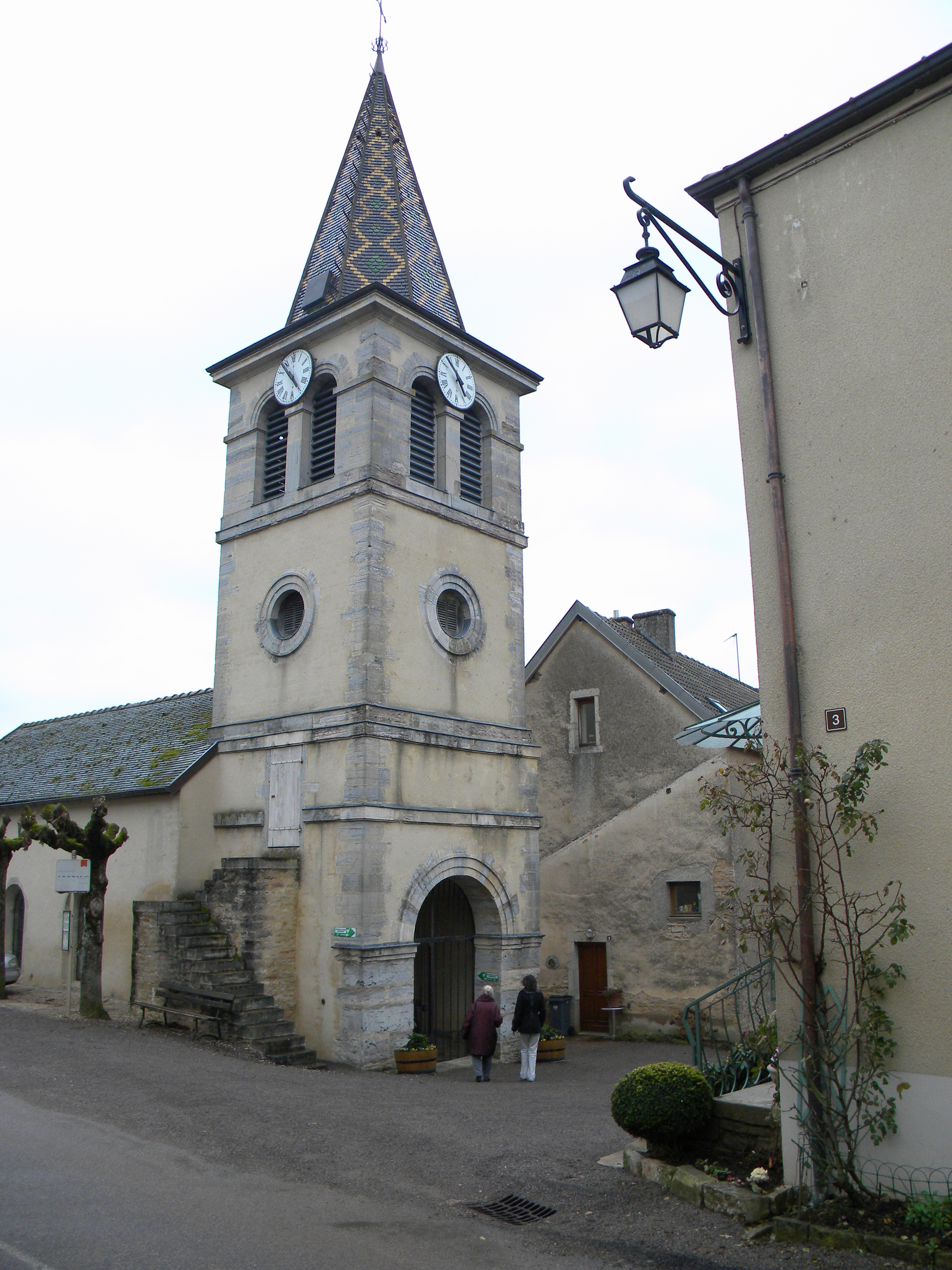
- The church in Chevannes
- Location of Chevannes
- Location within France Location within Bourgogne-Franche-Comté
- Coordinates: 47°09′33″N 4°50′56″E
- Country: France
- Region: Bourgogne-Franche-Comté
- Department: Côte-d'Or
- Arrondissement: Beaune
- Canton: Longvic
- Intercommunality: Gevrey-Chambertin et Nuits-Saint-Georges

Government
  - Mayor (2020–2026): Gérard Fricot
- Area^{1}: 6.29 km^{2} (2.43 sq mi)
- Highest elevation: 636 m (2,087 ft)
- Lowest elevation: 325 m (1,066 ft)
- Population (2023): 170
  - Density: 27/km^{2} (70/sq mi)
- Time zone: UTC+01:00 (CET)
  - Summer (DST): UTC+02:00 (CEST)
- INSEE/Postal code: 21169 /21220
- ^{1} French Land Register data, which excludes lakes, ponds, glaciers > 1 km^{2} (0.386 sq mi or 247 acres) and river estuaries.

Chevannes (French pronunciation: [ʃəvan]) is a commune in the Côte-d'Or department in eastern France.

== Population ==
Historical population
Year	Pop.	±% p.a.
1968	115	—
1975	82	−4.72%
1982	95	+2.12%
1990	102	+0.89%
1999	113	+1.14%
2007	134	+2.15%
2012	135	+0.15%
2017	160	+3.46%
2023	170	+1.02%
Source: INSEE

== See also ==
- Communes of the Côte-d'Or department
