= Segrois =

- Commune
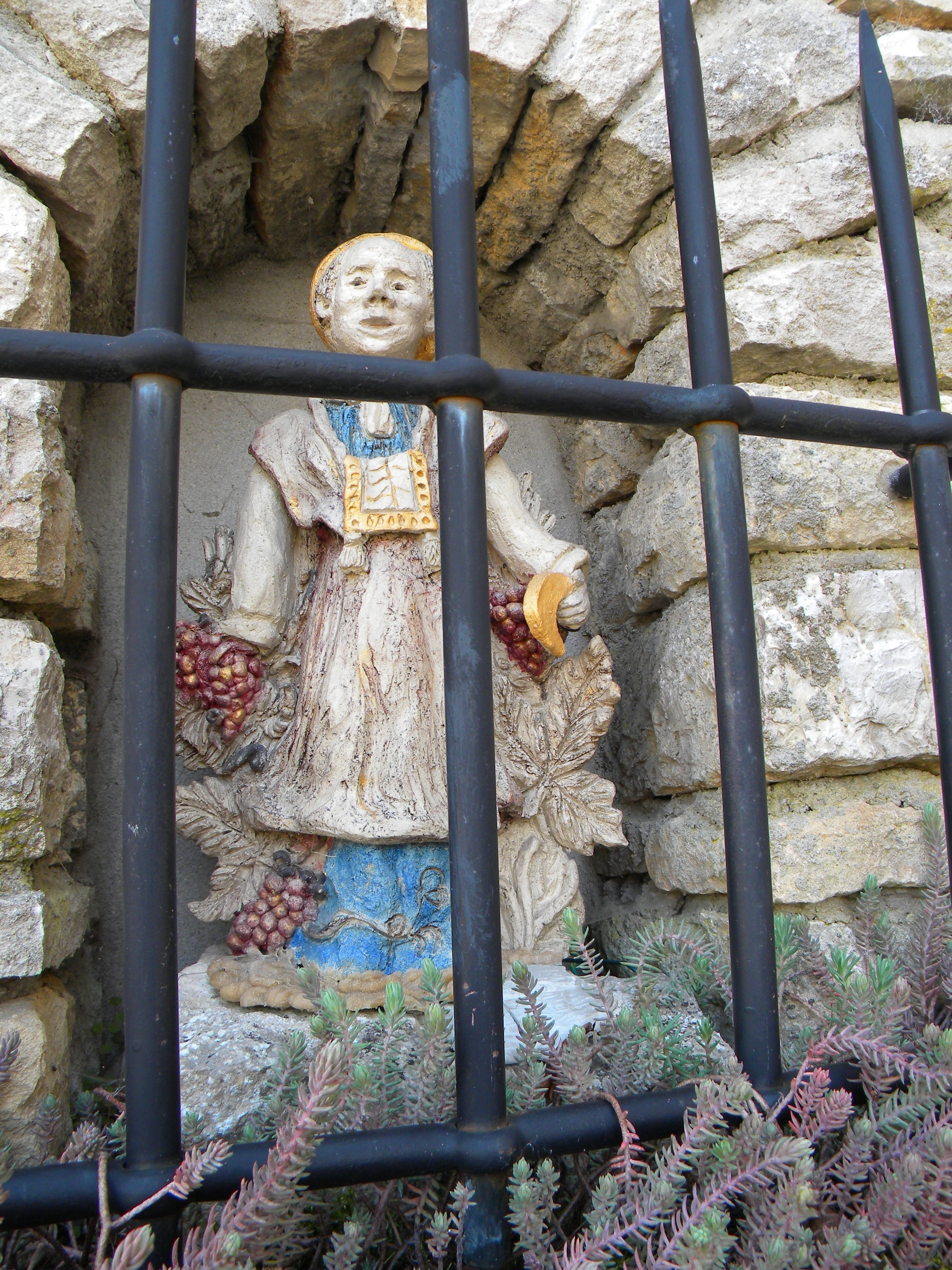
- A statue of Saint Vincent in Segrois
- Location of Segrois
- Location within France Location within Bourgogne-Franche-Comté
- Coordinates: 47°09′37″N 4°53′36″E
- Country: France
- Region: Bourgogne-Franche-Comté
- Department: Côte-d'Or
- Arrondissement: Beaune
- Canton: Longvic
- Intercommunality: Gevrey-Chambertin et Nuits-Saint-Georges

Government
  - Mayor (2020–2026): Gilbert Morin
- Area^{1}: 2.29 km^{2} (0.88 sq mi)
- Highest elevation: 49 m (161 ft)
- Lowest elevation: 282 m (925 ft)
- Population (2023): 55
  - Density: 24/km^{2} (62/sq mi)
- Time zone: UTC+01:00 (CET)
  - Summer (DST): UTC+02:00 (CEST)
- INSEE/Postal code: 21597 /21220
- ^{1} French Land Register data, which excludes lakes, ponds, glaciers > 1 km^{2} (0.386 sq mi or 247 acres) and river estuaries.

Segrois (French pronunciation: [səɡʁwa]) is a commune in the Côte-d'Or department in eastern France.

== Population ==
Historical population
Year	Pop.	±% p.a.
1968	37	—
1975	37	+0.00%
1982	35	−0.79%
1990	71	+9.24%
1999	54	−3.00%
2007	52	−0.47%
2012	48	−1.59%
2017	46	−0.85%
2023	55	+3.02%
Source: INSEE

== See also ==
- Communes of the Côte-d'Or department
