= Bevier =

Bevier or BeVier may refer to:

== People ==
- Isabel Bevier (1860-1942), an early scholar in home economics
- Lillian BeVier (born 1939), a professor of law at the University of Virginia School of Law
- Lottie Gertrude Bevier, the maiden name of the Zimbabwean politician Trudy Stevenson
- Robert Bevier (1834-1889), a Confederate colonel during the American Civil War

== Places ==
- Bevier, Kentucky
- Bevier, Missouri

== Structures ==
- Bevier-Elting House, a home in the Huguenot Street Historic District in New Paltz, New York
- Bevier Hall, an academic building on the University of Illinois Urbana-Champaign campus
- Bevier Hall, the former name of Minnewaska Hall on the State University of New York at New Paltz campus
- Bevier House Museum, Marbletown, New York

== Other ==
- Bevier Engineering Library, a unit of the University Library System at the University of Pittsburgh
- Bevier and Southern Railroad, an American railroad that existed from 1914 to 1982

== See also ==
- Bevy (disambiguation)
