= Collonges-lès-Bévy =

- Commune
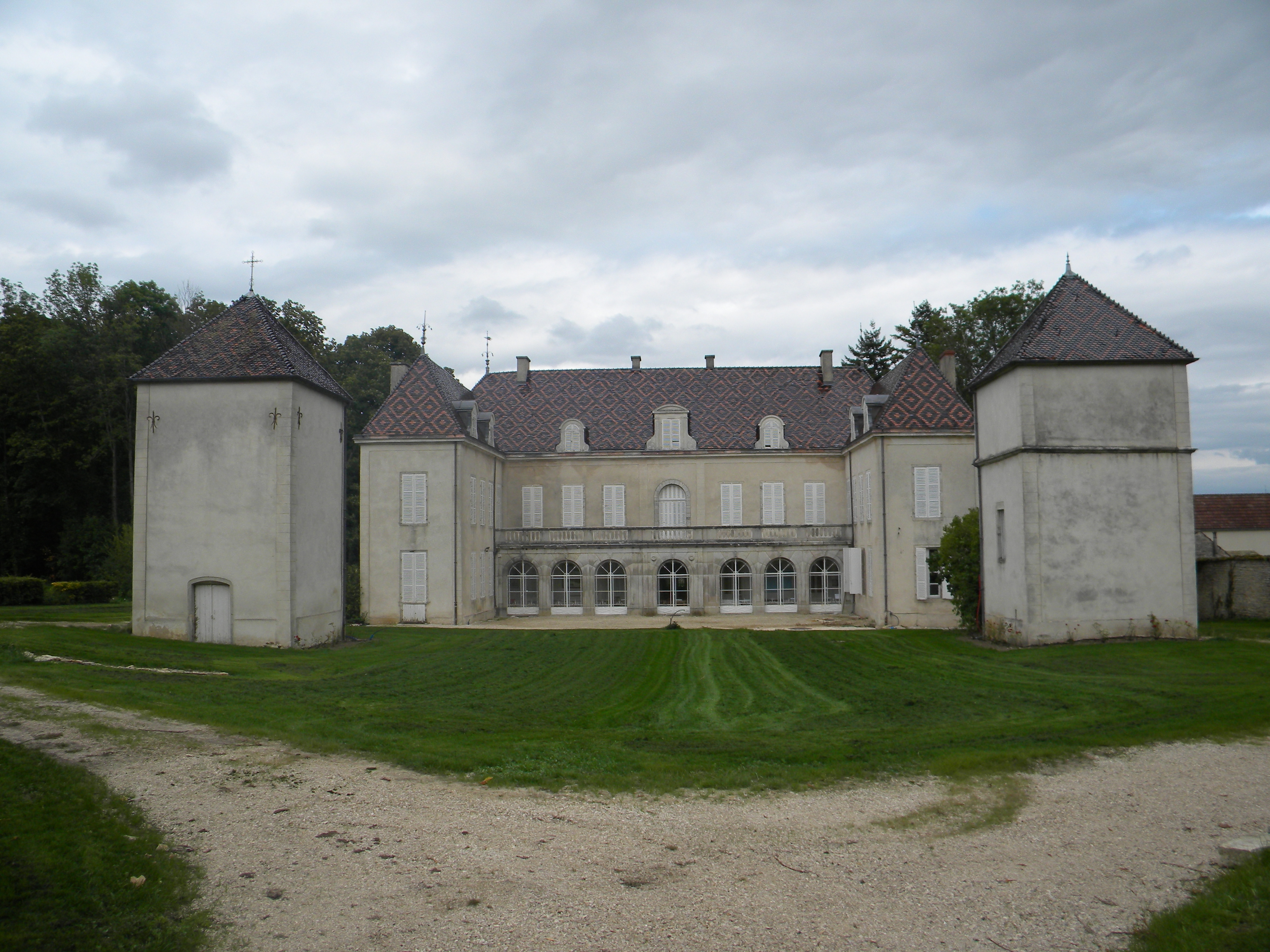
- The chateau in Collonges-lès-Bévy

- Coat of arms
- Location of Collonges-lès-Bévy
- Location within France Location within Bourgogne-Franche-Comté
- Coordinates: 47°10′13″N 4°51′09″E
- Country: France
- Region: Bourgogne-Franche-Comté
- Department: Côte-d'Or
- Arrondissement: Beaune
- Canton: Longvic
- Intercommunality: Gevrey-Chambertin et Nuits-Saint-Georges

Government
  - Mayor (2020–2026): Sylvie Vachet
- Area^{1}: 5.39 km^{2} (2.08 sq mi)
- Highest elevation: 626 m (2,054 ft)
- Lowest elevation: 310 m (1,020 ft)
- Population (2023): 93
  - Density: 17/km^{2} (45/sq mi)
- Time zone: UTC+01:00 (CET)
  - Summer (DST): UTC+02:00 (CEST)
- INSEE/Postal code: 21182 /21220
- ^{1} French Land Register data, which excludes lakes, ponds, glaciers > 1 km^{2} (0.386 sq mi or 247 acres) and river estuaries.

Collonges-lès-Bévy (French pronunciation: [kɔlɔ̃ʒ lɛ bevi], literally Collonges near Bévy) is a commune in the Côte-d'Or department in eastern France.

== Population ==
Historical population
Year	Pop.	±% p.a.
1968	59	—
1975	57	−0.49%
1982	55	−0.51%
1990	70	+3.06%
1999	79	+1.35%
2007	88	+1.36%
2012	96	+1.76%
2017	94	−0.42%
2023	93	−0.18%
Source: INSEE

== See also ==
- Communes of the Côte-d'Or department
