= Valforêt =

- Commune
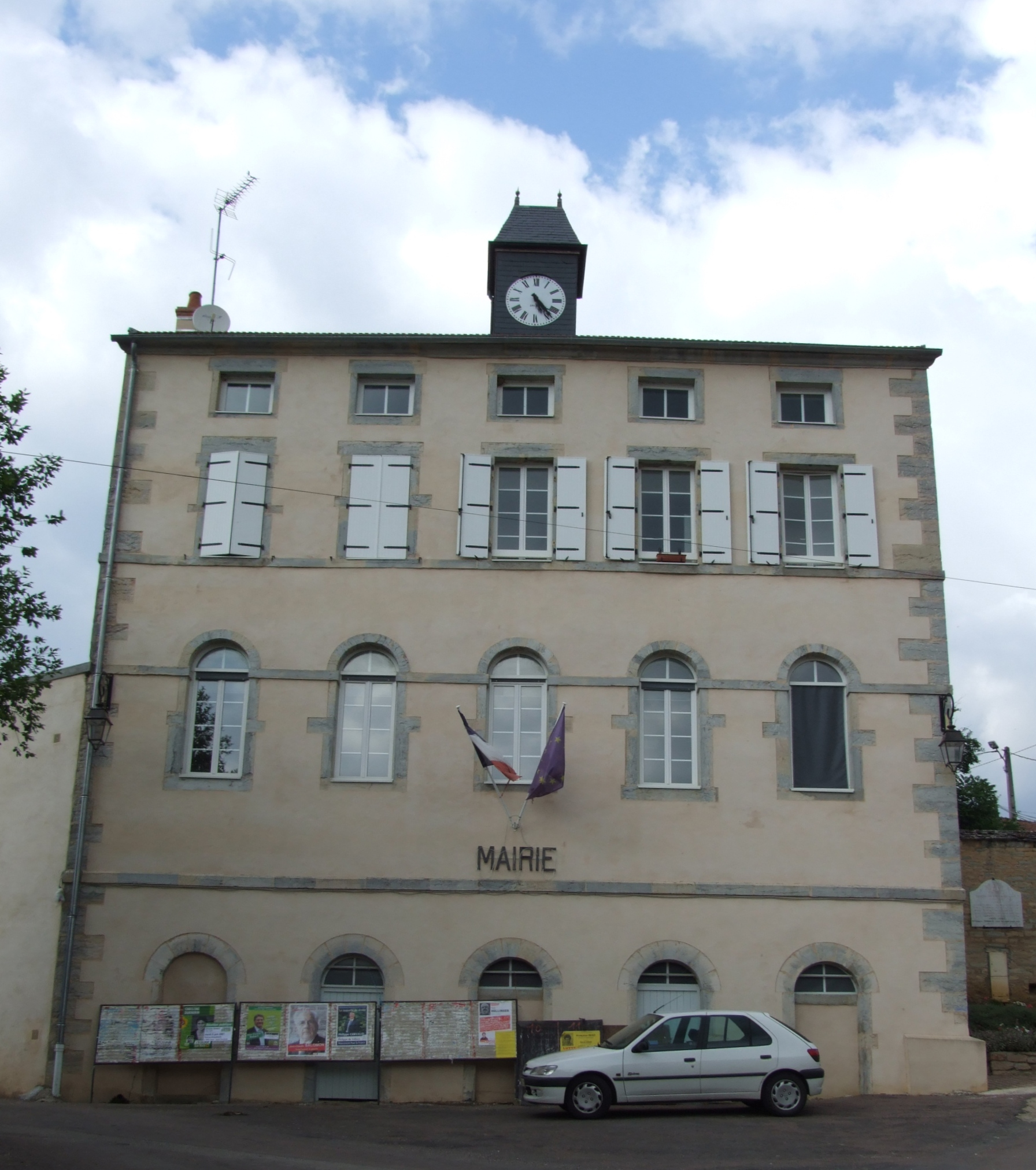
- Town hall in Clémencey

- Coat of arms
- Location of Valforêt
- Location within France Location within Bourgogne-Franche-Comté
- Coordinates: 47°14′53″N 4°52′59″E
- Country: France
- Region: Bourgogne-Franche-Comté
- Department: Côte-d'Or
- Arrondissement: Beaune
- Canton: Longvic

Government
  - Mayor (2020–2026): Christian Roussel
- Area^{1}: 22.04 km^{2} (8.51 sq mi)
- Highest elevation: 579 m (1,900 ft)
- Lowest elevation: 330 m (1,080 ft)
- Population (2023): 331
  - Density: 15.0/km^{2} (38.9/sq mi)
- Time zone: UTC+01:00 (CET)
  - Summer (DST): UTC+02:00 (CEST)
- INSEE/Postal code: 21178 /21220
- ^{1} French Land Register data, which excludes lakes, ponds, glaciers > 1 km^{2} (0.386 sq mi or 247 acres) and river estuaries.

Valforêt (French pronunciation: [valfɔʁɛ]) is a commune in the eastern French department of Côte-d'Or. It was established on 1 January 2019 by merger of the former communes of Clémencey (the seat) and Quemigny-Poisot.

== See also ==
- Communes of the Côte-d'Or department
