= Champlitte =

- Commune
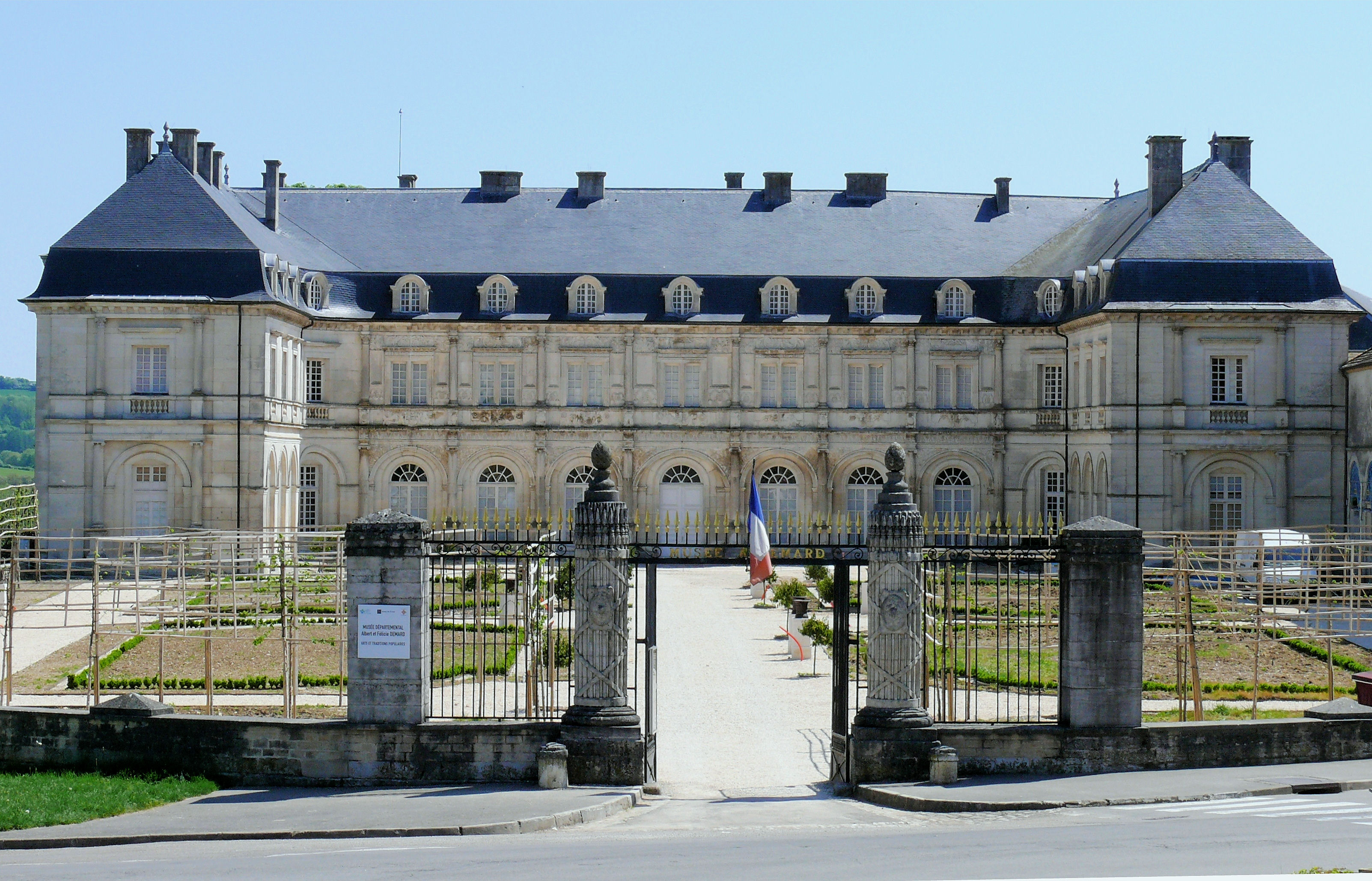
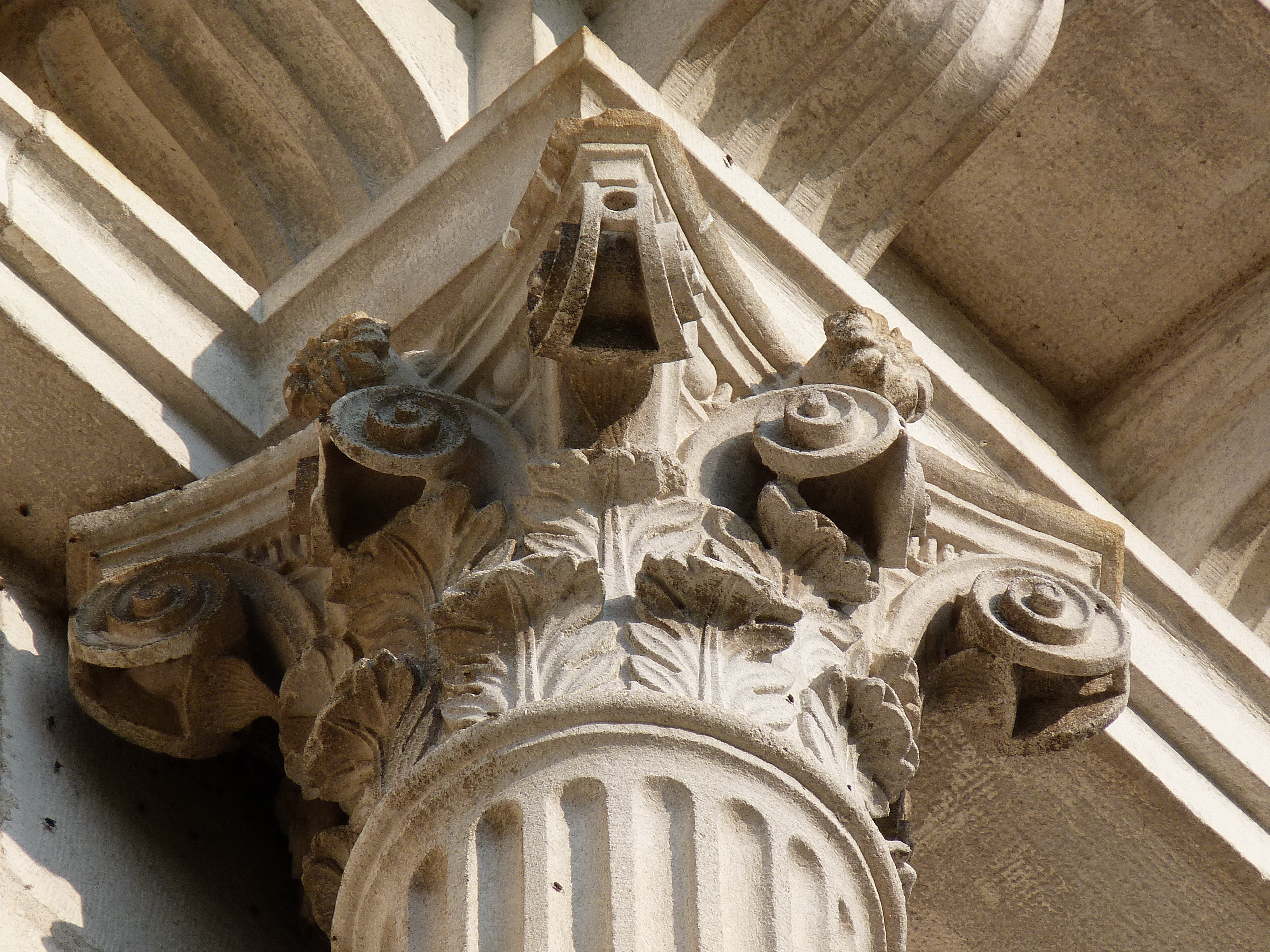
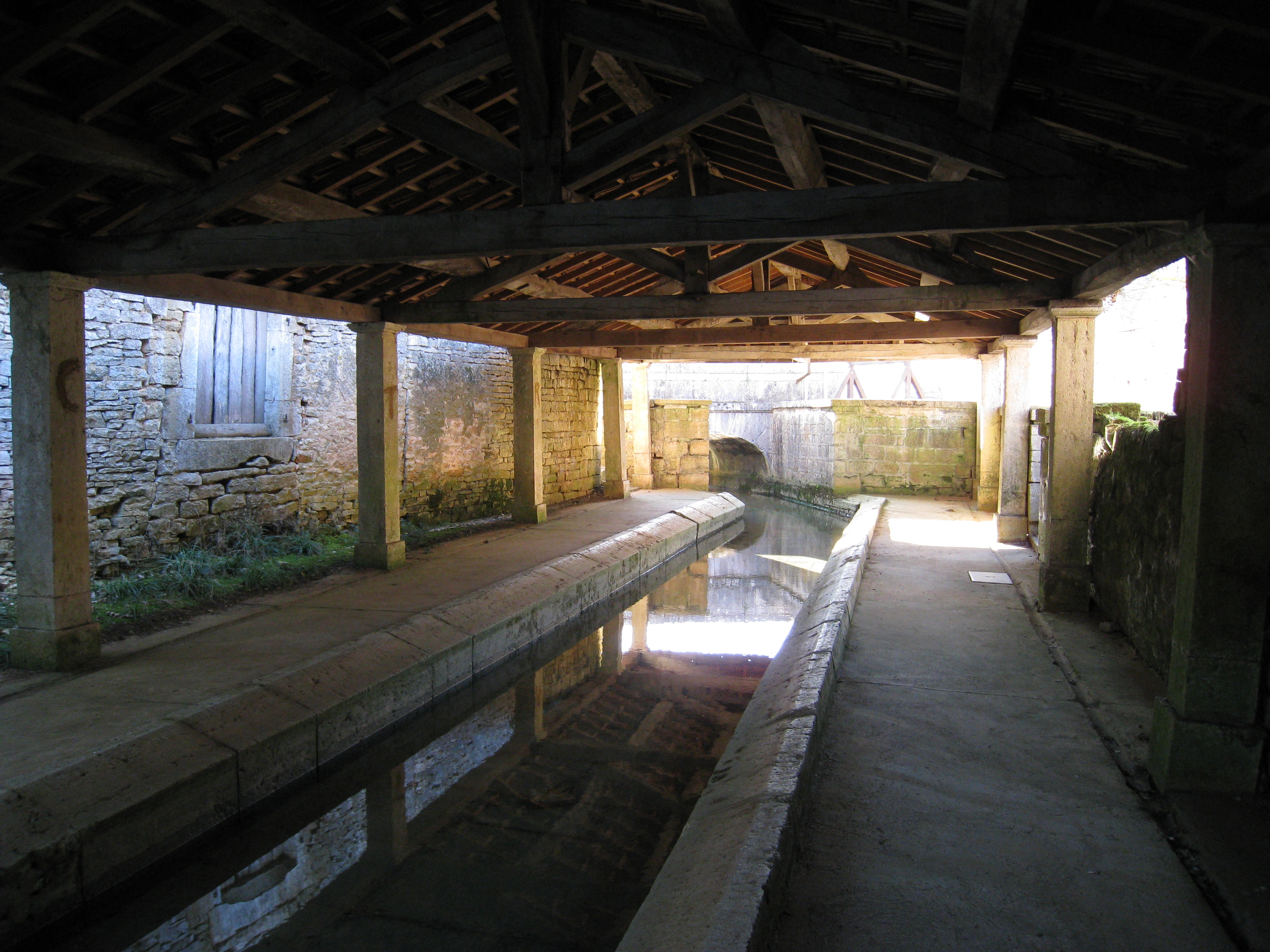
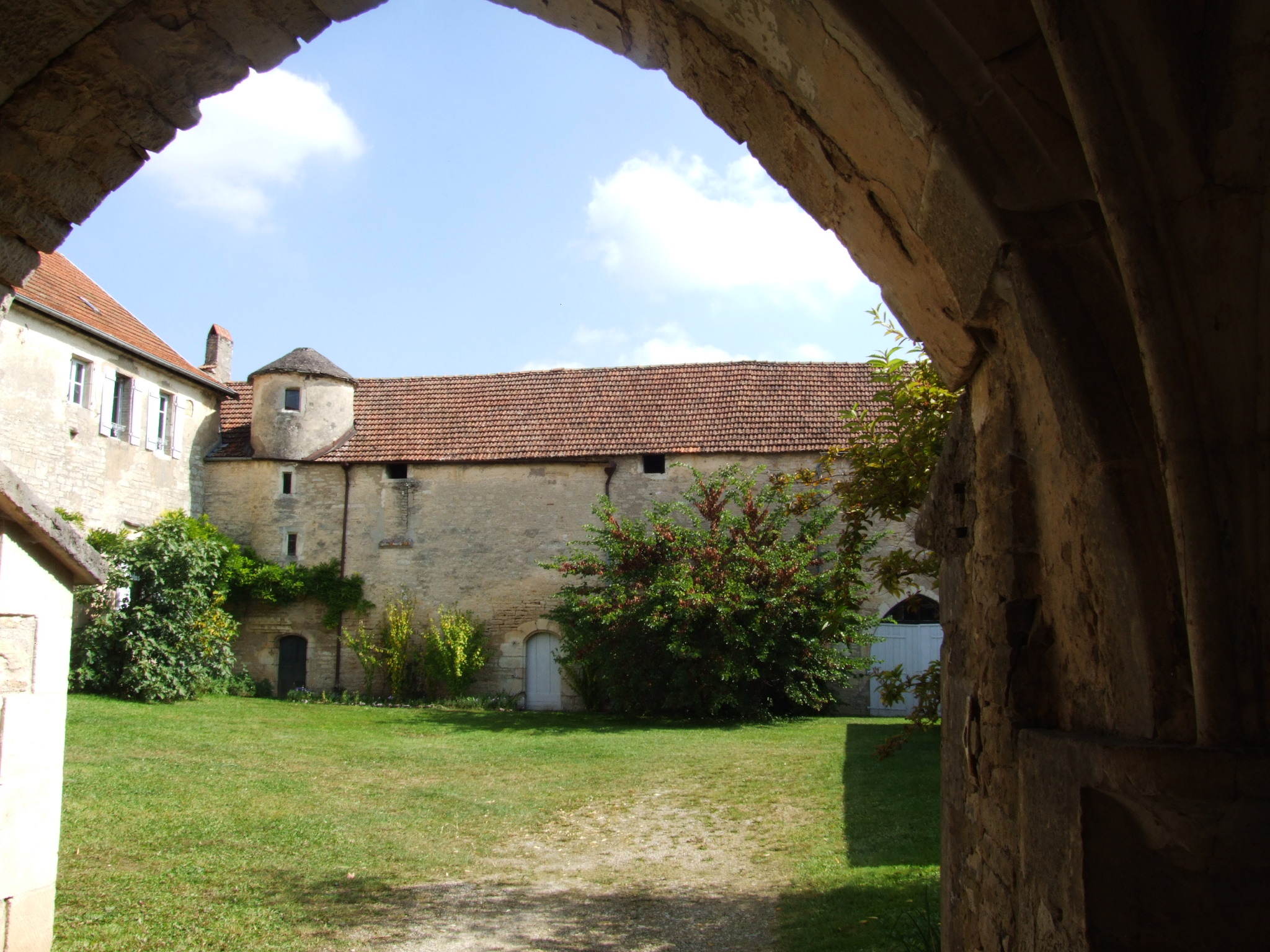
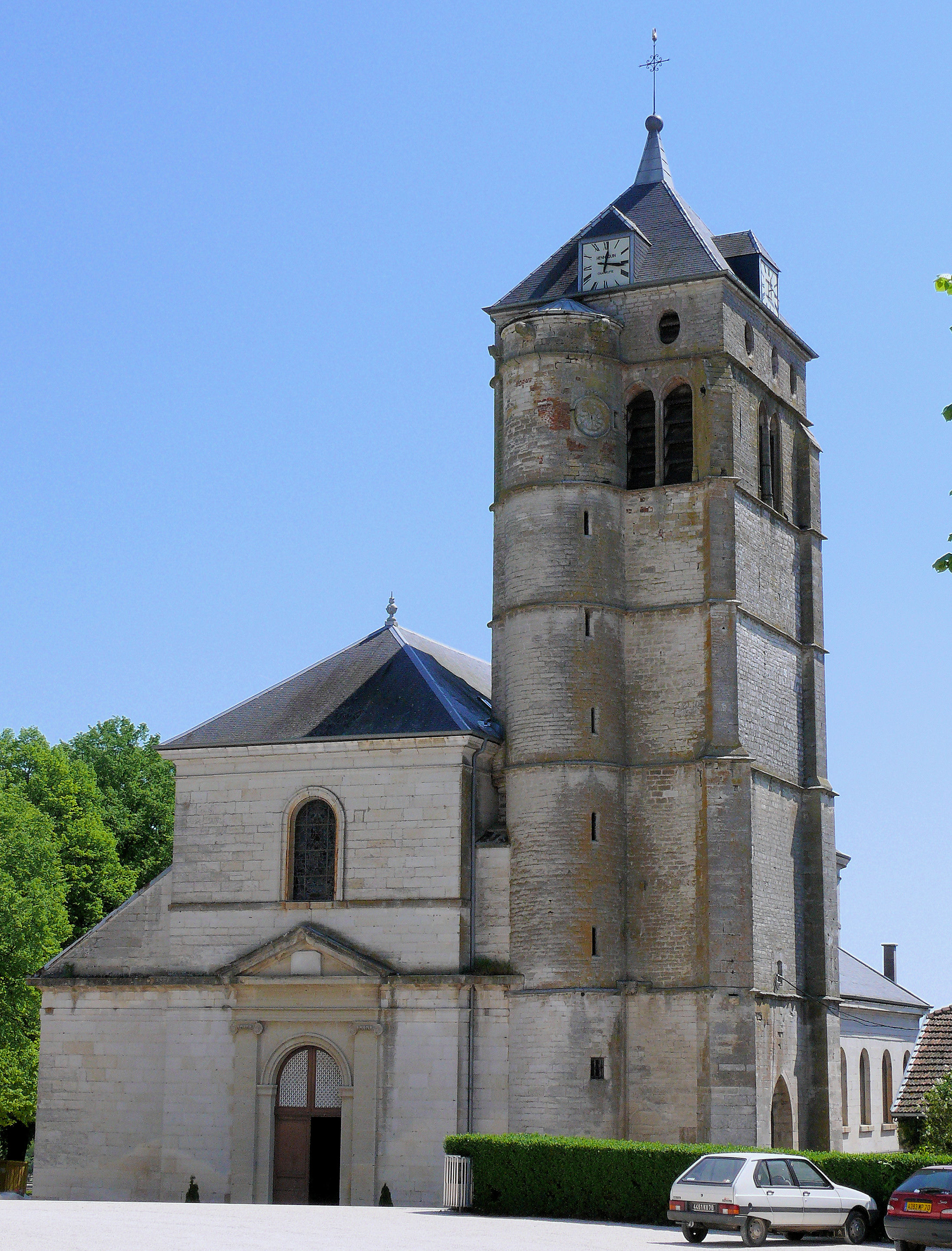
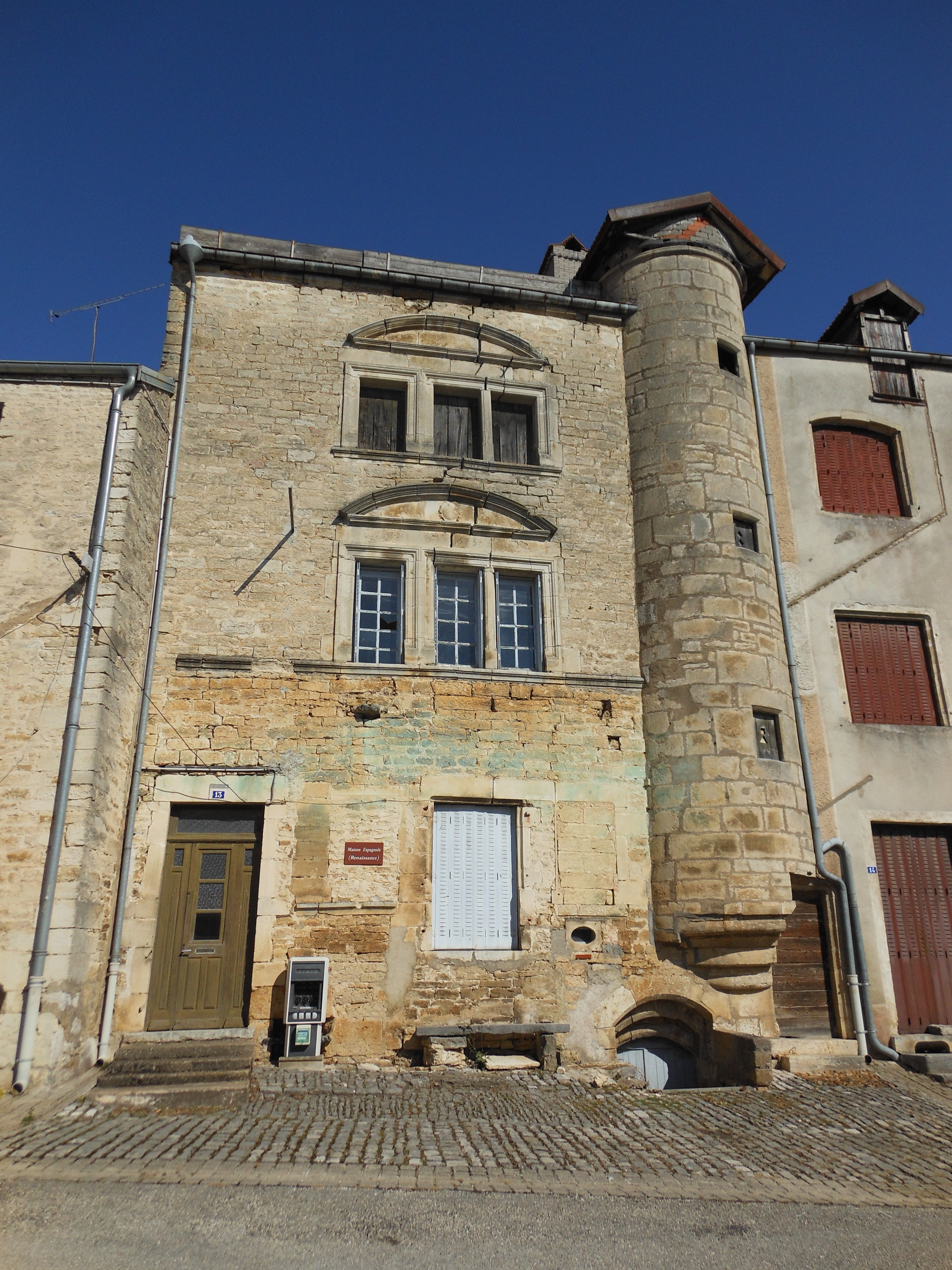

- Coat of arms
- Location of Champlitte
- Location within France Location within Bourgogne-Franche-Comté
- Coordinates: 47°37′01″N 5°30′53″E
- Country: France
- Region: Bourgogne-Franche-Comté
- Department: Haute-Saône
- Arrondissement: Vesoul
- Canton: Dampierre-sur-Salon

Government
  - Mayor (2020–2026): Patrice Colinet
- Area^{1}: 128.90 km^{2} (49.77 sq mi)
- Highest elevation: 379 m (1,243 ft)
- Lowest elevation: 208 m (682 ft)
- Population (2023): 1,585
  - Density: 12.30/km^{2} (31.85/sq mi)
- Time zone: UTC+01:00 (CET)
  - Summer (DST): UTC+02:00 (CEST)
- INSEE/Postal code: 70122 /70600
- ^{1} French Land Register data, which excludes lakes, ponds, glaciers > 1 km^{2} (0.386 sq mi or 247 acres) and river estuaries.

Champlitte (French pronunciation: [ʃɑ̃plit] or [ʃɑ̃lit]) is a commune in the Haute-Saône department in the region of Bourgogne-Franche-Comté in eastern France. The inhabitants of Champlitte are known in French as the Chanitois. Champlitte is the largest commune in Haute-Saône, with an area of 129 km^{2} (50 sq mi).

== History ==
During the Roman Era, Champlitte was close to two major roads, one from Langres to Besançon and the other from Danmartin to Langres. Several villas have been found in the area, as has a hoard from the third century, confirming that the area was inhabited.

The origin of the name come from Champlitte campus litensis or campus limites. We find the first written in the chronicle of the Abbey of Bèze. The first lord of Champlitte whose name is preserved was Gérard de Fouvent.

The town prospered under the Lords of Vergy.

Champlitte was successively part of the dioceses of Langres, Dijon and Besançon.

It was the chief town of the district from 1790 to 1795.

The commune of Champlitte in its present form was created in 1973 by the merger of municipalities of Champlitte-et-Prélot, Champlitte-la-Ville, Leffond, Margilley, Montarlot-lès-Champlitte and Neuvelle-lès-Champlitte. On 1 July 1974, the municipality was enlarged by the annexation of Frettes, an old town formerly belonging to the department of Haute-Marne. In terms of area, it is the largest municipality in the department of Haute-Saône.

Champlitte is the third largest wine growing area in Franche-Comté.

== Geography ==
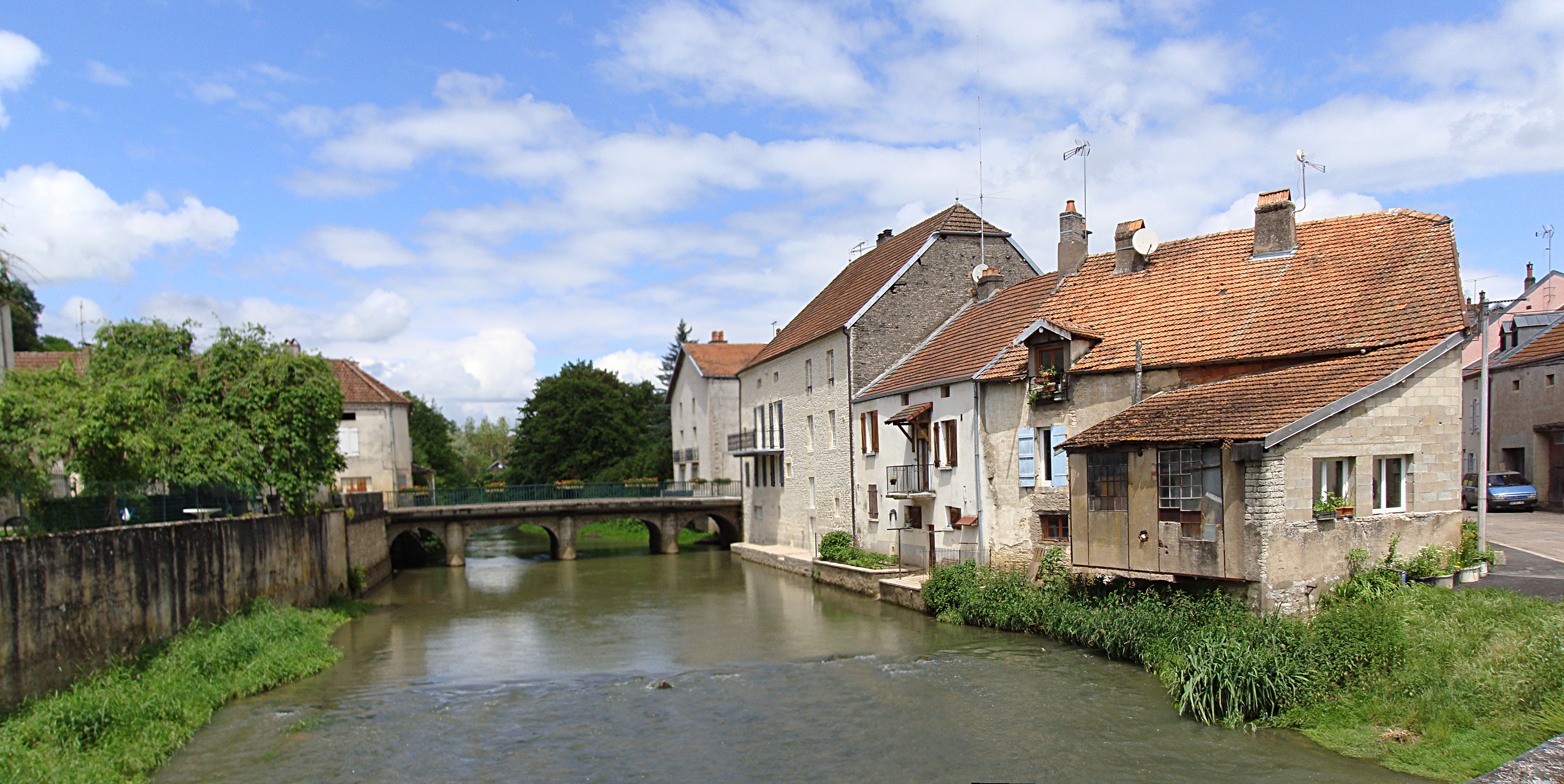
The river "Le Salon" in Champlitte

The city is situated on a hill at an elevation of 240 metres and is located at the edge of the regions Bourgogne-Franche-Comté and Grand Est. It overlooks the River Salon.

== See also ==
- Communes of the Haute-Saône department
- Count of Champlitte
