= Longvic =

- Commune
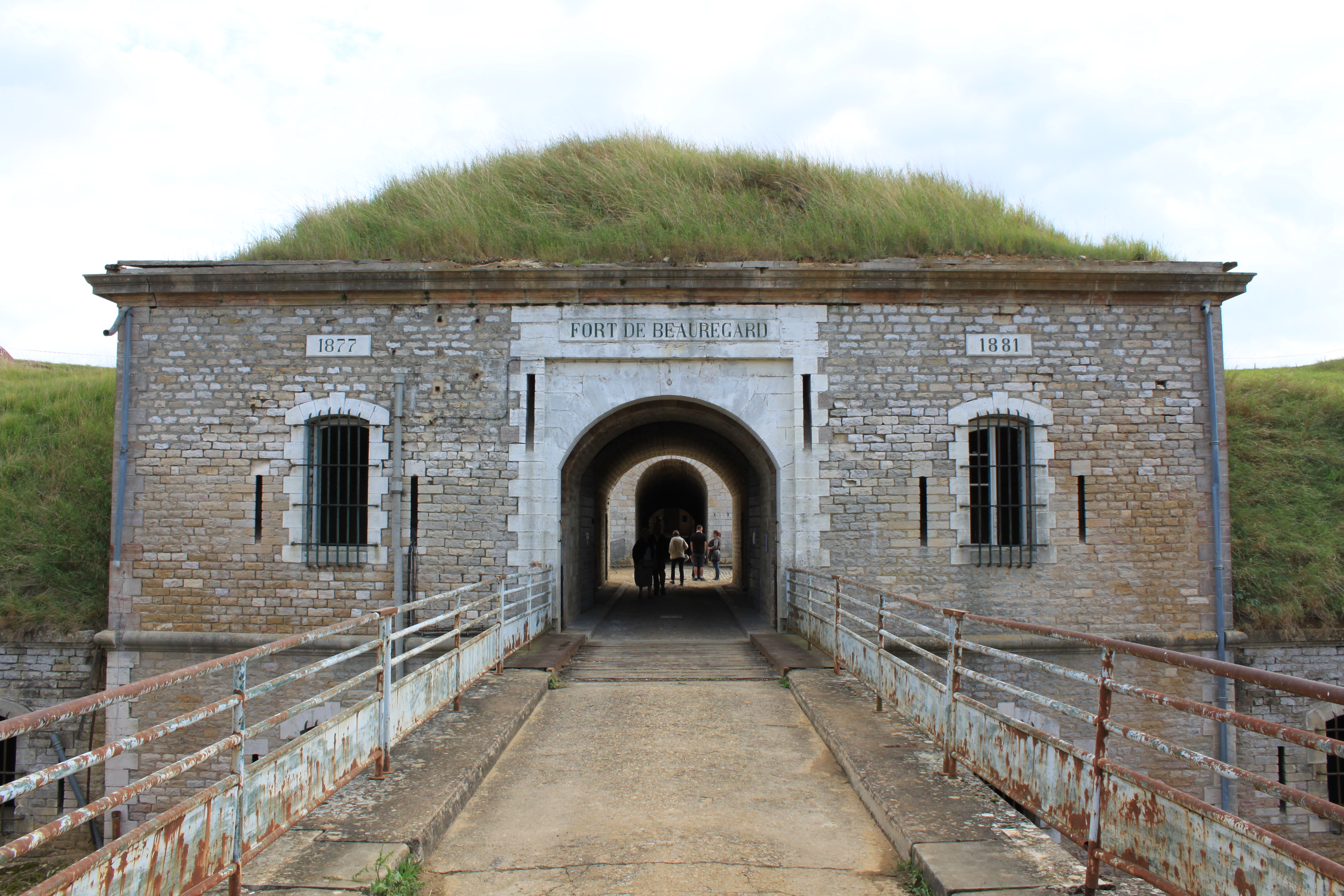
- Fort of Beauregard, built shortly after the Franco-Prussian War

- Coat of arms
- Location of Longvic
- Location within France Location within Bourgogne-Franche-Comté
- Coordinates: 47°17′19″N 5°03′52″E
- Country: France
- Region: Bourgogne-Franche-Comté
- Department: Côte-d'Or
- Arrondissement: Dijon
- Canton: Longvic
- Intercommunality: Dijon Métropole

Government
  - Mayor (2024–2026): Céline Tonot
- Area^{1}: 10.56 km^{2} (4.08 sq mi)
- Highest elevation: 247 m (810 ft)
- Lowest elevation: 219 m (719 ft)
- Population (2023): 8,896
  - Density: 842.4/km^{2} (2,182/sq mi)
- Time zone: UTC+01:00 (CET)
  - Summer (DST): UTC+02:00 (CEST)
- INSEE/Postal code: 21355 /21600
- ^{1} French Land Register data, which excludes lakes, ponds, glaciers > 1 km^{2} (0.386 sq mi or 247 acres) and river estuaries.

Longvic (French pronunciation: [lɔ̃vi]) is a commune in the Côte-d'Or department in eastern France. It is the twin city of New Holland, Pennsylvania, due to a Case New Holland plant being located in Longvic.

== Population ==
Historical population

Year	Pop.	±% p.a.
1901	522	—
1906	646	+4.35%
1911	712	+1.96%
1921	911	+2.50%
1926	1,200	+5.67%
1931	1,534	+5.03%
1936	1,883	+4.18%
1946	1,883	+0.00%
1954	2,901	+5.55%
1962	4,372	+5.26%

Year	Pop.	±% p.a.
1968	5,202	+2.94%
1975	7,448	+5.26%
1982	8,179	+1.35%
1990	8,273	+0.14%
1999	9,017	+0.96%
2007	9,358	+0.47%
2012	9,078	−0.61%
2017	8,604	−1.07%
2023	8,896	+0.56%

Source: EHESS and INSEE (1968–2023)

== Personalities ==
Rangers F.C. and Algeria defender Madjid Bougherra was born here.

== See also ==
- Communes of the Côte-d'Or department
