= Urcy =

- Commune
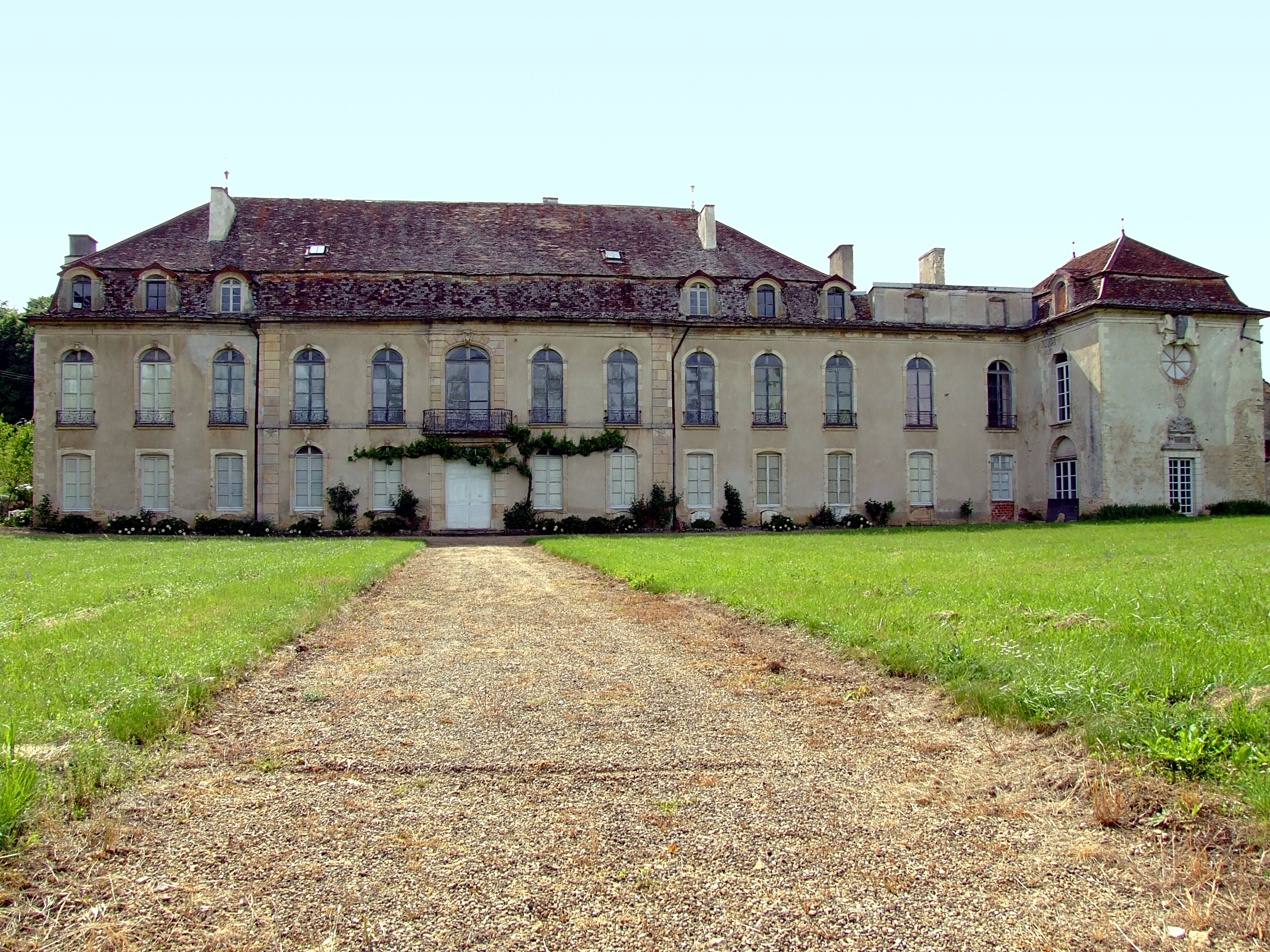
- Chateau of Monculot

- Coat of arms
- Location of Urcy
- Location within France Location within Bourgogne-Franche-Comté
- Coordinates: 47°15′43″N 4°51′11″E
- Country: France
- Region: Bourgogne-Franche-Comté
- Department: Côte-d'Or
- Arrondissement: Beaune
- Canton: Longvic
- Intercommunality: Gevrey-Chambertin et Nuits-Saint-Georges

Government
  - Mayor (2020–2026): Christian Marchiset
- Area^{1}: 7.93 km^{2} (3.06 sq mi)
- Highest elevation: 569 m (1,867 ft)
- Lowest elevation: 305 m (1,001 ft)
- Population (2023): 143
  - Density: 18.0/km^{2} (46.7/sq mi)
- Time zone: UTC+01:00 (CET)
  - Summer (DST): UTC+02:00 (CEST)
- INSEE/Postal code: 21650 /21220
- ^{1} French Land Register data, which excludes lakes, ponds, glaciers > 1 km^{2} (0.386 sq mi or 247 acres) and river estuaries.

Urcy (French pronunciation: [yʁsi]) is a commune in the Côte-d'Or department in eastern France.

== Population ==
Historical population
Year	Pop.	±% p.a.
1968	63	—
1975	46	−4.39%
1982	65	+5.06%
1990	83	+3.10%
1999	117	+3.89%
2007	136	+1.90%
2012	153	+2.38%
2017	153	+0.00%
2023	143	−1.12%
Source: INSEE

== See also ==
- Communes of the Côte-d'Or department
