= Curtil-Vergy =

- Commune
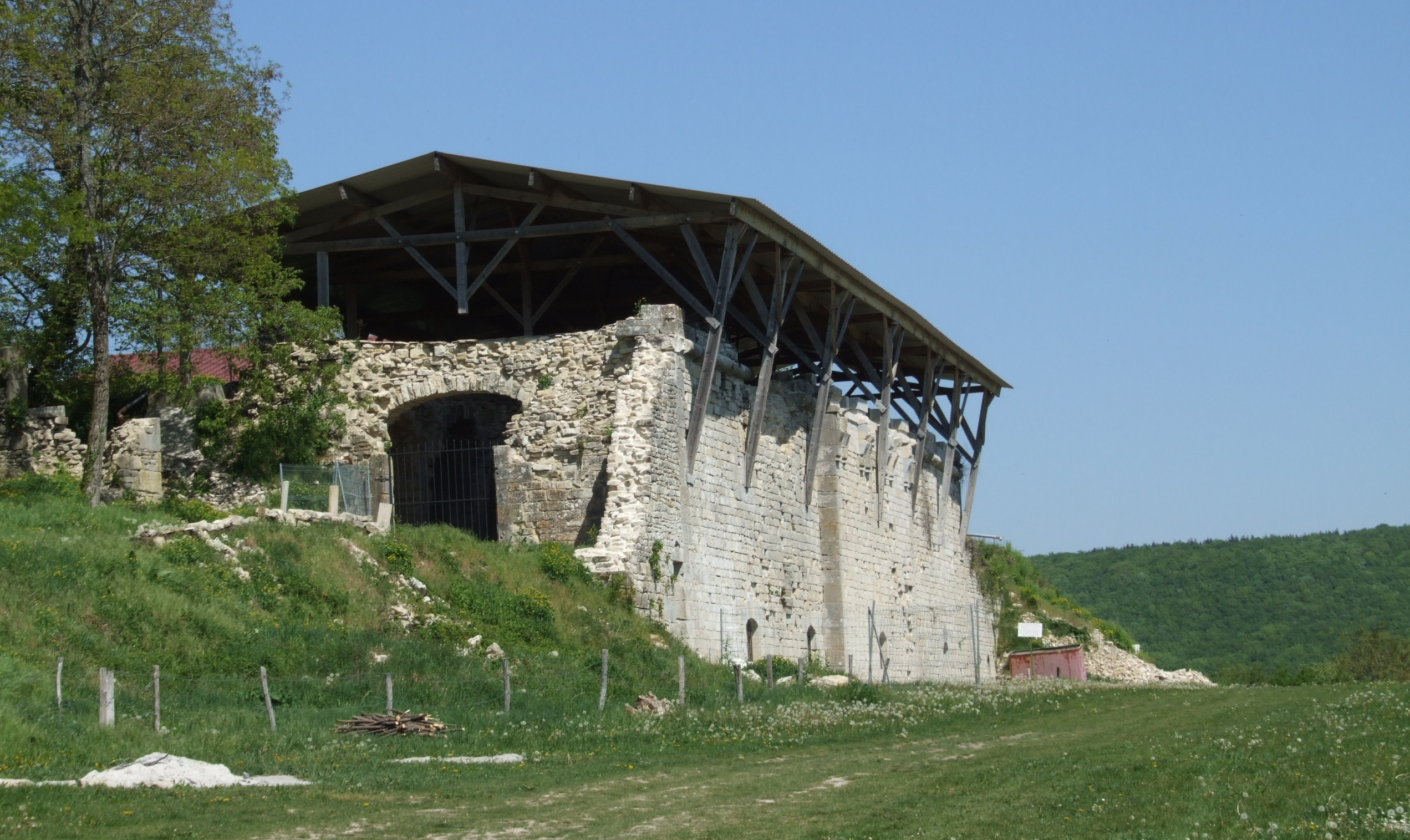
- Ruin of the Saint-Vivant Abbey at Vergy
- Location of Curtil-Vergy
- Location within France Location within Bourgogne-Franche-Comté
- Coordinates: 47°10′14″N 4°53′23″E
- Country: France
- Region: Bourgogne-Franche-Comté
- Department: Côte-d'Or
- Arrondissement: Beaune
- Canton: Longvic
- Intercommunality: Gevrey-Chambertin et Nuits-Saint-Georges

Government
  - Mayor (2020–2026): Gilles Stunault
- Area^{1}: 2.7 km^{2} (1.0 sq mi)
- Highest elevation: 516 m (1,693 ft)
- Lowest elevation: 294 m (965 ft)
- Population (2023): 163
  - Density: 60/km^{2} (160/sq mi)
- Time zone: UTC+01:00 (CET)
  - Summer (DST): UTC+02:00 (CEST)
- INSEE/Postal code: 21219 /21220
- ^{1} French Land Register data, which excludes lakes, ponds, glaciers > 1 km^{2} (0.386 sq mi or 247 acres) and river estuaries.

Curtil-Vergy is a commune in the Côte-d'Or department in eastern France. It has an average population density of 51 people per km^{2}, and an unemployment rate between 9.4 and 10.6%. It is known for its hiking.

== Population ==
Historical population
| Year | Pop. | ±% p.a. |
|---|---|---|
| 1968 | 47 | — |
| 1975 | 60 | +3.55% |
| 1982 | 81 | +4.38% |
| 1990 | 78 | −0.47% |
| 1999 | 85 | +0.96% |
| 2007 | 104 | +2.55% |
| 2012 | 126 | +3.91% |
| 2017 | 136 | +1.54% |
| 2023 | 163 | +3.06% |
Source: INSEE

== See also ==
- Communes of the Côte-d'Or department
