= L'Étang-Vergy =

- Commune
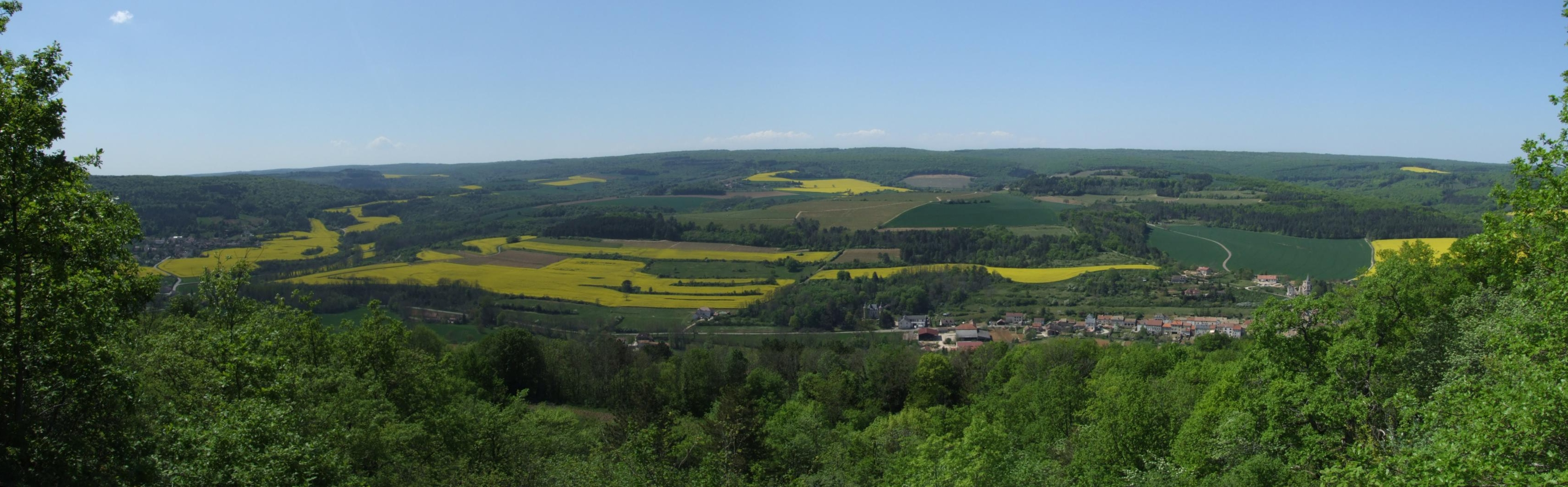
- A general view of L'Étang-Vergy

- Coat of arms
- Location of L'Étang-Vergy
- Location within France Location within Bourgogne-Franche-Comté
- Coordinates: 47°10′42″N 4°52′42″E
- Country: France
- Region: Bourgogne-Franche-Comté
- Department: Côte-d'Or
- Arrondissement: Beaune
- Canton: Longvic
- Intercommunality: Gevrey-Chambertin et Nuits-Saint-Georges

Government
  - Mayor (2020–2026): Gilles Malsert
- Area^{1}: 2.65 km^{2} (1.02 sq mi)
- Highest elevation: 500 m (1,600 ft)
- Lowest elevation: 302 m (991 ft)
- Population (2023): 200
  - Density: 75/km^{2} (200/sq mi)
- Time zone: UTC+01:00 (CET)
  - Summer (DST): UTC+02:00 (CEST)
- INSEE/Postal code: 21254 /21220
- ^{1} French Land Register data, which excludes lakes, ponds, glaciers > 1 km^{2} (0.386 sq mi or 247 acres) and river estuaries.

L'Étang-Vergy (French pronunciation: [letɑ̃ vɛʁʒi]) is a commune in the Côte-d'Or department in eastern France.

== Population ==
Historical population
Year	Pop.	±% p.a.
1968	176	—
1975	160	−1.35%
1982	163	+0.27%
1990	150	−1.03%
1999	183	+2.23%
2007	198	+0.99%
2012	190	−0.82%
2017	213	+2.31%
2023	200	−1.04%
Source: INSEE

== See also ==
- Communes of the Côte-d'Or department
