= Ternant, Côte-d'Or =

Ternant
- Commune
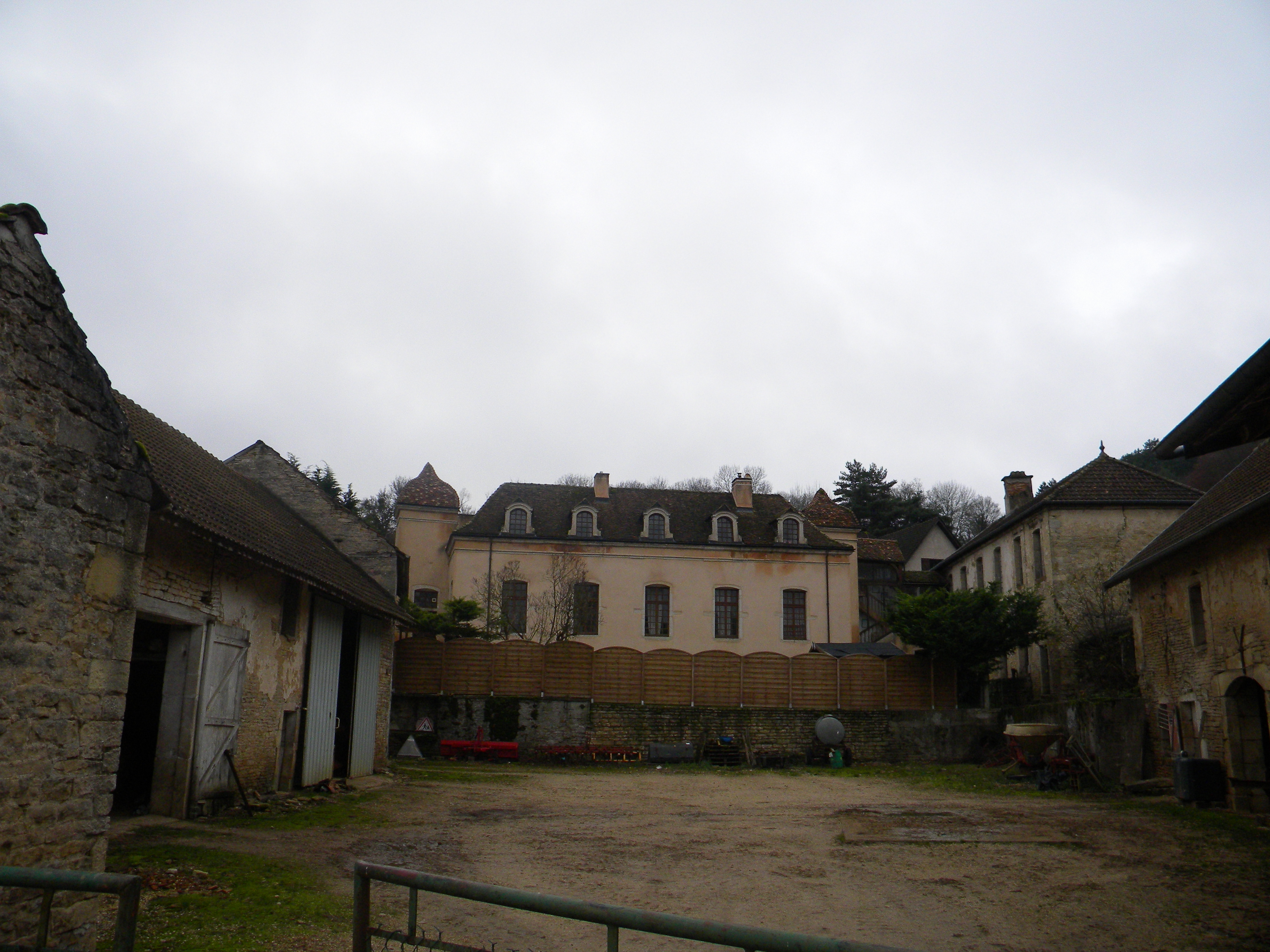
- Chateau

- Coat of arms
- Location of Ternant
- Location within France Location within Bourgogne-Franche-Comté
- Coordinates: 47°12′08″N 4°51′19″E
- Country: France
- Region: Bourgogne-Franche-Comté
- Department: Côte-d'Or
- Arrondissement: Beaune
- Canton: Longvic
- Intercommunality: Gevrey-Chambertin et Nuits-Saint-Georges

Government
  - Mayor (2020–2026): Régis Dorland
- Area^{1}: 16.35 km^{2} (6.31 sq mi)
- Highest elevation: 636 m (2,087 ft)
- Lowest elevation: 335 m (1,099 ft)
- Population (2023): 81
  - Density: 5.0/km^{2} (13/sq mi)
- Time zone: UTC+01:00 (CET)
  - Summer (DST): UTC+02:00 (CEST)
- INSEE/Postal code: 21625 /21220
- ^{1} French Land Register data, which excludes lakes, ponds, glaciers > 1 km^{2} (0.386 sq mi or 247 acres) and river estuaries.

Ternant (French pronunciation: [tɛʁnɑ̃]) is a commune in the Côte-d'Or department in eastern France.

== Population ==
Historical population
Year	Pop.	±% p.a.
1968	64	—
1975	55	−2.14%
1982	69	+3.29%
1990	73	+0.71%
1999	72	−0.15%
2007	96	+3.66%
2012	96	+0.00%
2017	83	−2.87%
2023	81	−0.41%
Source: INSEE

== See also ==
- Communes of the Côte-d'Or department
