= Messanges, Côte-d'Or =

Messanges
- Commune
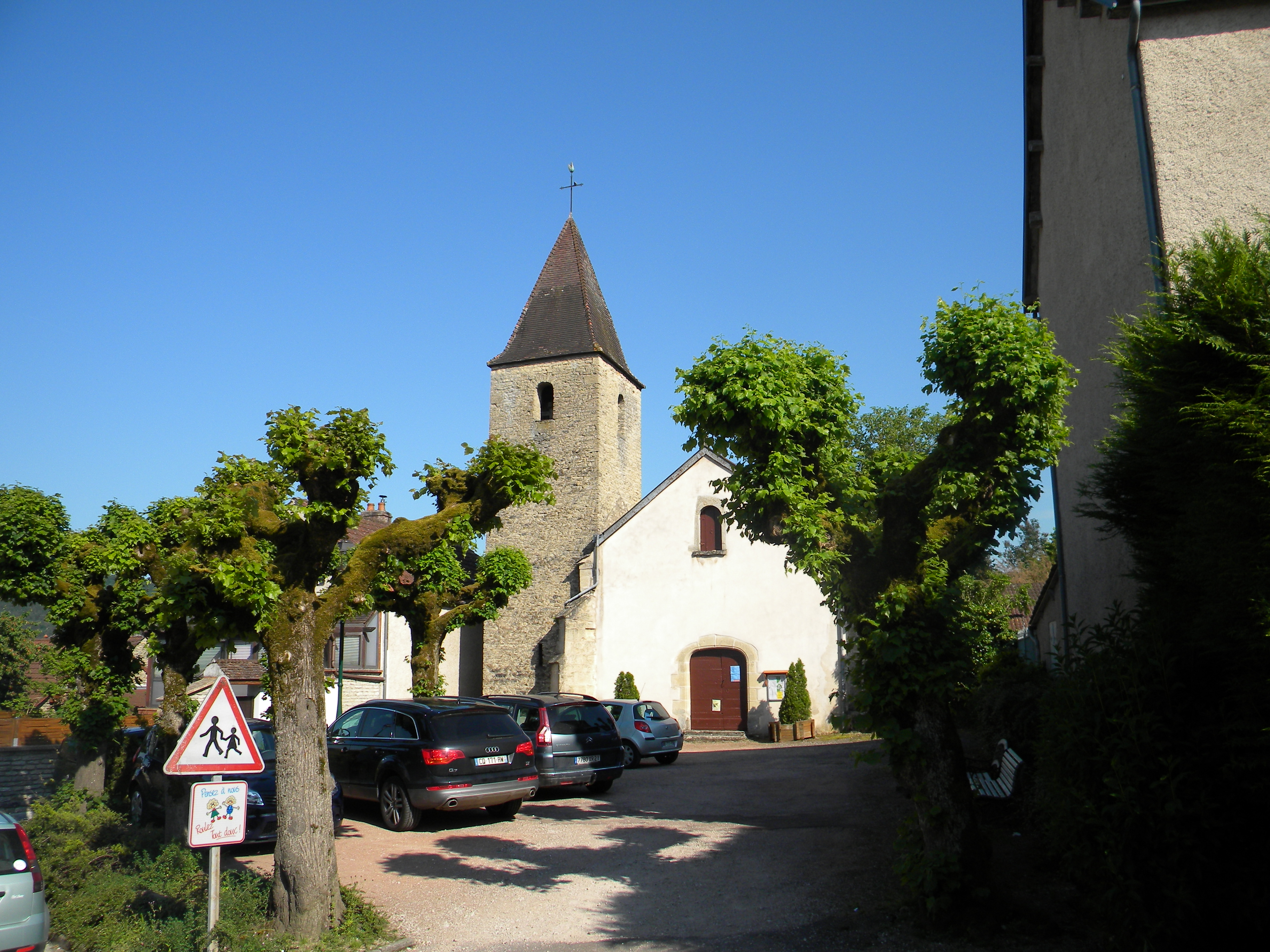
- The church in Messanges
- Location of Messanges
- Location within France Location within Bourgogne-Franche-Comté
- Coordinates: 47°09′47″N 4°52′24″E
- Country: France
- Region: Bourgogne-Franche-Comté
- Department: Côte-d'Or
- Arrondissement: Beaune
- Canton: Longvic
- Intercommunality: Gevrey-Chambertin et Nuits-Saint-Georges

Government
  - Mayor (2024–2026): Catherine Davadan
- Area^{1}: 3.05 km^{2} (1.18 sq mi)
- Highest elevation: 487 m (1,598 ft)
- Lowest elevation: 282 m (925 ft)
- Population (2023): 250
  - Density: 82/km^{2} (210/sq mi)
- Time zone: UTC+01:00 (CET)
  - Summer (DST): UTC+02:00 (CEST)
- INSEE/Postal code: 21407 /21220
- ^{1} French Land Register data, which excludes lakes, ponds, glaciers > 1 km^{2} (0.386 sq mi or 247 acres) and river estuaries.

Messanges (French pronunciation: [mesɑ̃ʒ]) is a commune in the Côte-d'Or department in eastern France.

== Population ==
Historical population
Year	Pop.	±% p.a.
1968	105	—
1975	105	+0.00%
1982	121	+2.05%
1990	173	+4.57%
1999	194	+1.28%
2007	240	+2.70%
2012	236	−0.34%
2017	236	+0.00%
2023	250	+0.97%
Source: INSEE

== See also ==
- Communes of the Côte-d'Or department
