= Chambœuf, Côte-d'Or =

Chambœuf
- Commune
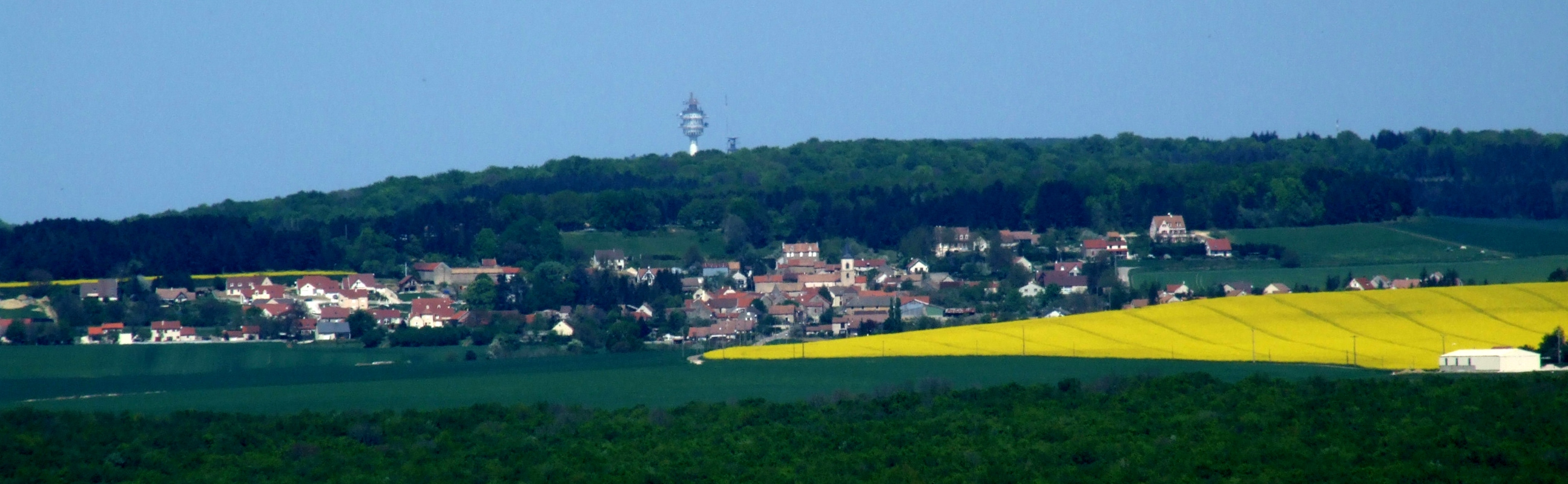
- A general view of Chambœuf

- Coat of arms
- Location of Chambœuf
- Location within France Location within Bourgogne-Franche-Comté
- Coordinates: 47°13′52″N 4°54′23″E
- Country: France
- Region: Bourgogne-Franche-Comté
- Department: Côte-d'Or
- Arrondissement: Beaune
- Canton: Longvic
- Intercommunality: Gevrey-Chambertin et Nuits-Saint-Georges

Government
  - Mayor (2020–2026): Jacques Barthélemy
- Area^{1}: 11.25 km^{2} (4.34 sq mi)
- Highest elevation: 551 m (1,808 ft)
- Lowest elevation: 360 m (1,180 ft)
- Population (2023): 374
  - Density: 33.2/km^{2} (86.1/sq mi)
- Time zone: UTC+01:00 (CET)
  - Summer (DST): UTC+02:00 (CEST)
- INSEE/Postal code: 21132 /21220
- ^{1} French Land Register data, which excludes lakes, ponds, glaciers > 1 km^{2} (0.386 sq mi or 247 acres) and river estuaries.

Chambœuf (French pronunciation: [ʃɑ̃bœf]) is a commune in the Côte-d'Or department in eastern France.

== Population ==
Historical population
Year	Pop.	±% p.a.
1968	119	—
1975	120	+0.12%
1982	201	+7.65%
1990	268	+3.66%
1999	268	+0.00%
2007	324	+2.40%
2012	343	+1.15%
2017	382	+2.18%
2023	374	−0.35%
Source: INSEE

== See also ==
- Communes of the Côte-d'Or department
