= Reulle-Vergy =

- Commune
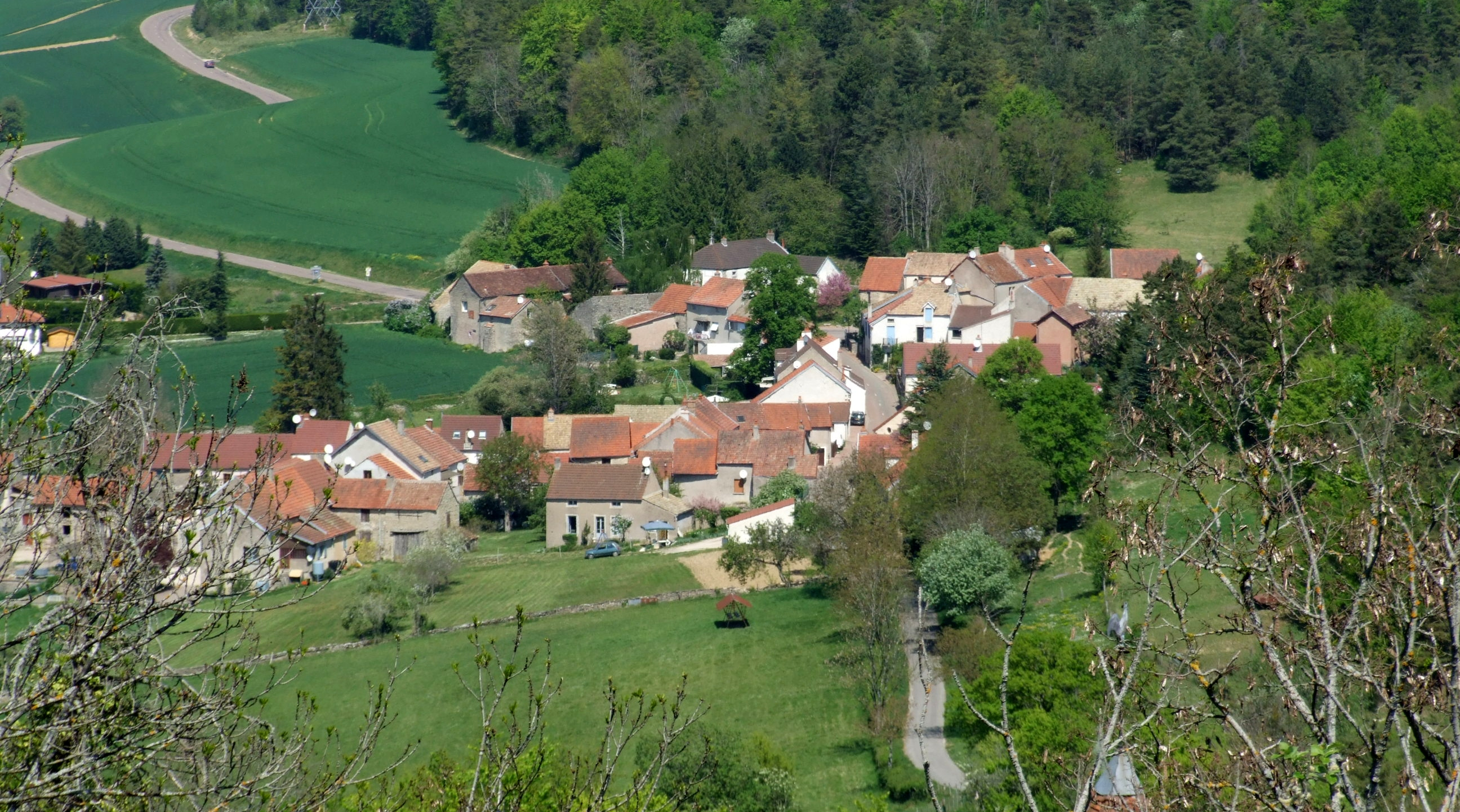
- A general view of Reulle-Vergy

- Coat of arms
- Location of Reulle-Vergy
- Location within France Location within Bourgogne-Franche-Comté
- Coordinates: 47°11′14″N 4°53′44″E
- Country: France
- Region: Bourgogne-Franche-Comté
- Department: Côte-d'Or
- Arrondissement: Beaune
- Canton: Longvic
- Intercommunality: Gevrey-Chambertin et Nuits-Saint-Georges

Government
  - Mayor (2020–2026): Laurent Bedenne
- Area^{1}: 6.13 km^{2} (2.37 sq mi)
- Highest elevation: 526 m (1,726 ft)
- Lowest elevation: 320 m (1,050 ft)
- Population (2023): 163
  - Density: 26.6/km^{2} (68.9/sq mi)
- Time zone: UTC+01:00 (CET)
  - Summer (DST): UTC+02:00 (CEST)
- INSEE/Postal code: 21523 /21220
- ^{1} French Land Register data, which excludes lakes, ponds, glaciers > 1 km^{2} (0.386 sq mi or 247 acres) and river estuaries.

Reulle-Vergy (French pronunciation: [ʁœl vɛʁʒi]) is a commune in the Côte-d'Or department in eastern France.

== Population ==
Historical population
Year	Pop.	±% p.a.
1968	98	—
1975	82	−2.51%
1982	84	+0.34%
1990	105	+2.83%
1999	99	−0.65%
2007	91	−1.05%
2012	131	+7.56%
2017	134	+0.45%
2023	163	+3.32%
Source: INSEE

== See also ==
- Communes of the Côte-d'Or department
