= Canton of Longvic =

Coordinates: 47.29°N 5.06°E

The canton of Longvic is an administrative division of the Côte-d'Or department, eastern France. It was created at the French canton reorganisation which came into effect in March 2015. Its seat is in Longvic.

It consists of the following communes:

1. Bévy
2. Bretenière
3. Brochon
4. Chambœuf
5. Chambolle-Musigny
6. Chevannes
7. Collonges-lès-Bévy
8. Couchey
9. Curley
10. Curtil-Vergy
11. Détain-et-Bruant
12. L'Étang-Vergy
13. Fénay
14. Fixin
15. Gevrey-Chambertin
16. Longvic
17. Messanges
18. Morey-Saint-Denis
19. Ouges
20. Perrigny-lès-Dijon
21. Reulle-Vergy
22. Segrois
23. Semezanges
24. Ternant
25. Urcy
26. Valforêt
