= Bévy =

- Commune
- Location of Bévy
- Location within France Location within Bourgogne-Franche-Comté
- Coordinates: 47°10′47″N 4°51′19″E
- Country: France
- Region: Bourgogne-Franche-Comté
- Department: Côte-d'Or
- Arrondissement: Beaune
- Canton: Longvic
- Intercommunality: Gevrey-Chambertin et Nuits-Saint-Georges

Government
  - Mayor (2020–2026): Thomas Cagniant
- Area^{1}: 5.26 km^{2} (2.03 sq mi)
- Highest elevation: 626 m (2,054 ft)
- Lowest elevation: 329 m (1,079 ft)
- Population (2023): 133
  - Density: 25.3/km^{2} (65.5/sq mi)
- Time zone: UTC+01:00 (CET)
  - Summer (DST): UTC+02:00 (CEST)
- INSEE/Postal code: 21070 /21220
- ^{1} French Land Register data, which excludes lakes, ponds, glaciers > 1 km^{2} (0.386 sq mi or 247 acres) and river estuaries.

Bévy (French pronunciation: [bevi]) is a commune in the Côte-d'Or department in eastern France.

== Population ==
Historical population
Year	Pop.	±% p.a.
1968	54	—
1975	62	+1.99%
1982	70	+1.75%
1990	80	+1.68%
1999	91	+1.44%
2007	94	+0.41%
2012	107	+2.62%
2017	139	+5.37%
2023	133	−0.73%
Source: INSEE

== See also ==
- Communes of the Côte-d'Or department
