= Canton of Péronnas =

Coordinates: 46°10′46″N 5°12′12″E

Péronnas
- Former canton
- Interactive map of Péronnas
- Country: France
- Region: Auvergne-Rhône-Alpes
- Department: Ain
- No. of communes: {{{nbcomm}}}
- Disbanded: 2015
- Area: 125.37 km^{2} (48.41 sq mi)
- Population (2012): 14,371
  - Density: 114.63/km^{2} (296.89/sq mi)

The canton of Péronnas is a former administrative division in eastern France. It was disbanded following the French canton reorganisation which came into effect in March 2015. It had 14,371 inhabitants (2012).

The canton comprised 8 communes:

- Lent
- Montagnat
- Montracol
- Péronnas
- Saint-André-sur-Vieux-Jonc
- Saint-Just
- Saint-Rémy
- Servas

== Demographics ==
Historical population Canton of Péronnas
Year	1962	1968	1975	1982	1990	1999
Pop.	4,598	5,394	7,096	9,837	11,259	12,200
±%	—	+17.3%	+31.6%	+38.6%	+14.5%	+8.4%
From the year 1962 on: No double counting – residents of multiple communes (e.g. students and military personnel) are counted only once. Source: INSEE

== See also ==
- Cantons of the Ain department
