= Stéphen Liégeard =

French lawyer, politician and writer (1830–1925)

Stéphen François Emile Liégeard
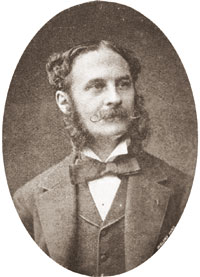

Deputy for Moselle
- In office 24 March 1867 – 4 September 1870
- Preceded by: Charles de Wendel

Personal details
- Born: 29 March 1830 Dijon, Côte-d'Or, France
- Died: 29 December 1925 (aged 95) Cannes, Alpes-Maritimes, France
- Occupation: Lawyer, writer, poet and deputy

Stéphen François Emile Liégeard (29 March 1830 – 29 December 1925) was a French lawyer, administrator, deputy, writer and poet. He gave the name "Côte d'Azur" (Azure Coast) to the French Riviera.

== Life ==
=== Early years (1830–67) ===
Stéphen François Emile Liégeard was born on 29 March 1830 in Dijon, Côte-d'Or. His parents were Jean Baptiste Liégeard (1800–87), Mayor of Dijon, and Catherine Emilie Vallow (c. 1810–82). His family was extremely wealthy. He studied at the Lycée in Dijon, then attended the Dijon Faculty of Law.

He published his first collection of poems and short theatrical plays, Memories of Some Summer Evenings, when he was 22, and throughout his life published many other works that were well-received by the critics.

He enrolled at the bar in Dijon in 1854. He was awarded a gold medal for his doctorate in law.

In 1856, Liégeard entered the administration as a counselor to the prefecture of Drôme.

He published a poem, The Golden Bees, in Honor of the Empire and the Emperor in 1859.

He was appointed sub-prefect of Briey, Moselle, in 1859.

On 17 December 1860, in Augny he married Jeanne Mathilde Labbé. Their daughter, Jeanne M. Adélaïde, was born in 1861.

Liégeard was appointed sub-prefect of Parthenay, Deux-Sèvres, in 1861, then of Carpentras, Vaucluse, in 1864.

=== Deputy (1867–70) ===
In 1867, Liégeard gave up his position as sub-prefect of Carpentras to run for election to the legislature. On 24 March 1867, he was elected deputy as official candidate for the second district of Moselle, replacing Charles de Wendel, who had resigned. He sat with the dynastic majority. He was reelected as the government candidate in the general elections of 24 May 1869. He signed the request for interpellation of the 116. He voted with the liberals. He was in favour of selection of mayors in municipal councils, in favour of ministerial responsibility, against hidden loans and in favour of lower railway tariffs. In July 1869, he voted for a subsidy of 100,000 francs to Gustave Lambert to undertake an expedition to the North Pole.

=== Later years (1870–1925) ===
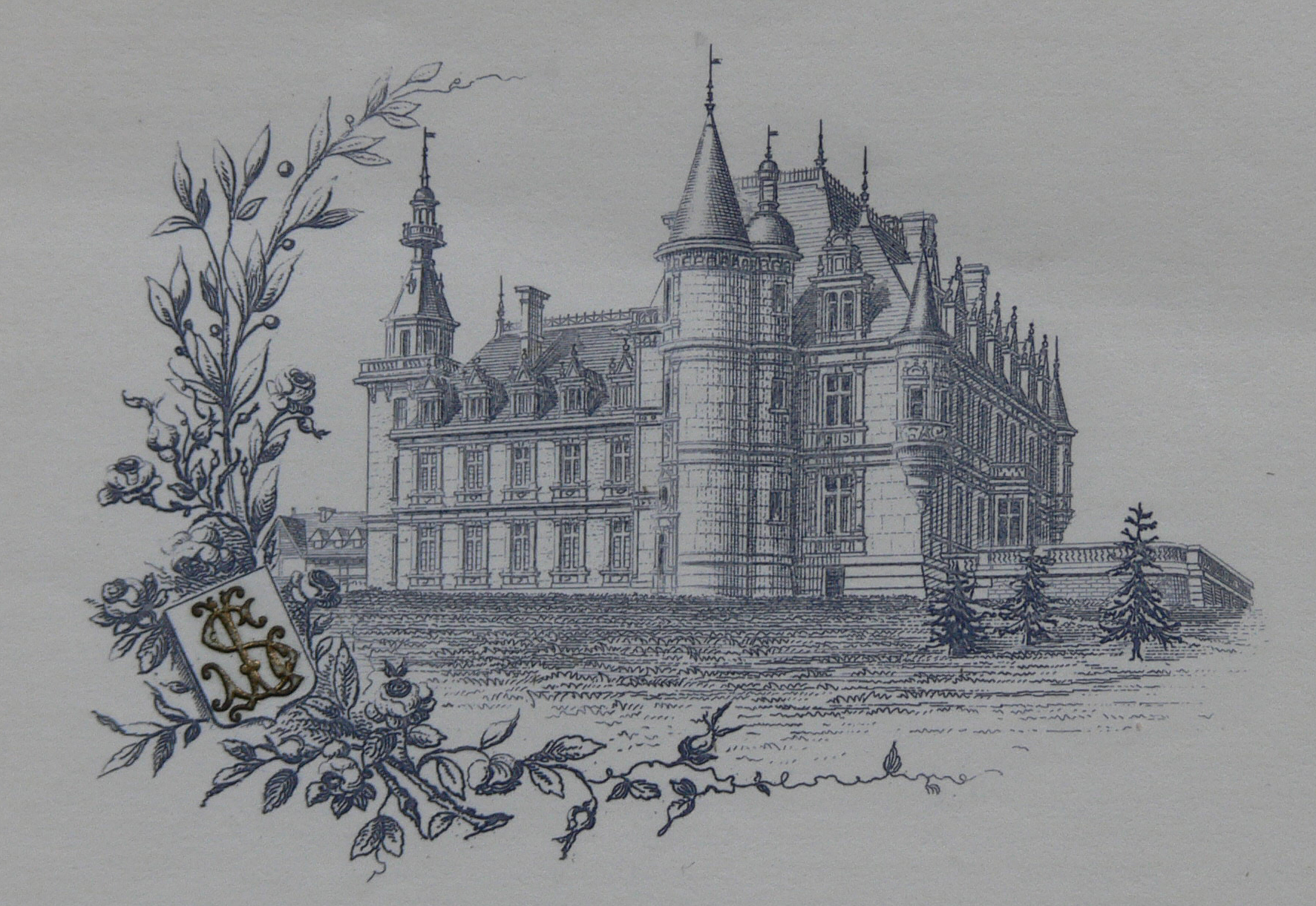
The château of Brochon, represented in Stéphen Liégeard's writing paper.

Liégeard returned to practice at the bar in Dijon when the legislation was dissolved on 4 September 1870 during the Franco-Prussian War. He joined the Dijon Academy and Clémence Isaure's Académie des Jeux Floraux.

Liégeard had a property in Cannes where he spent his winters, and loved the beauty of what he called the "Côte-d'Azur" by analogy with his birthplace, the "Côte-d'Or". The name substituted the azure blue color of the Mediterranean for the gold of Côte-d'Or.

His best known work, La Côte d'azur, was written at Brochon in 1887 and published in Paris in 1888. The Académie française awarded the book the prix Bordin.

The name "Côte d'Azur" became a common alternative to the "French Riviera".

Liégeard was ambitious to be admitted to the Académie française, but abandoned that hope after attempts in 1891, 1892 and 1902 all failed. His attempts to be elected to the Academy were rejected in favour of Pierre Loti, Edmond Rostand and Émile Zola.

Stéphen Liégeard built the Château de Brochon in an estate near Brochon, Côte-d'Or, that was partly acquired at the start of the 19th century by his grandfather, Étienne Liégeard. Étienne's son, Jean-Baptiste, completed the purchase in 1843, and Jean-Baptiste's son, Stephen Liégeard, bought the old castle that belonged to the estate from the family of the engineer Henry Darcy. Stéphen Liégeard had the château built as a monument to his wealth and good taste. Construction started in 1895 directed by the architects Louis Perreau and Leprince, a pupil of Eugène Viollet-le-Duc. The artists Xavier Schanosky, Achille Cesbron and Paul Gasq decorated the château.

Stéphen Liégeard was councilor-general of Moselle, a knight of the Legion of Honour (12 August 1866) and a Knight of Saint-Grégoire.

He died on 29 December 1925 in Cannes, Alpes-Maritimes. Gaston Liégeard, Stéphen's son, was a bachelor and died in 1953. His nephew refused to accept the château and it passed to the state, which decided to use it for a school. The Lycée Stéphen Liégeard was opened in 1962.

== Publications ==
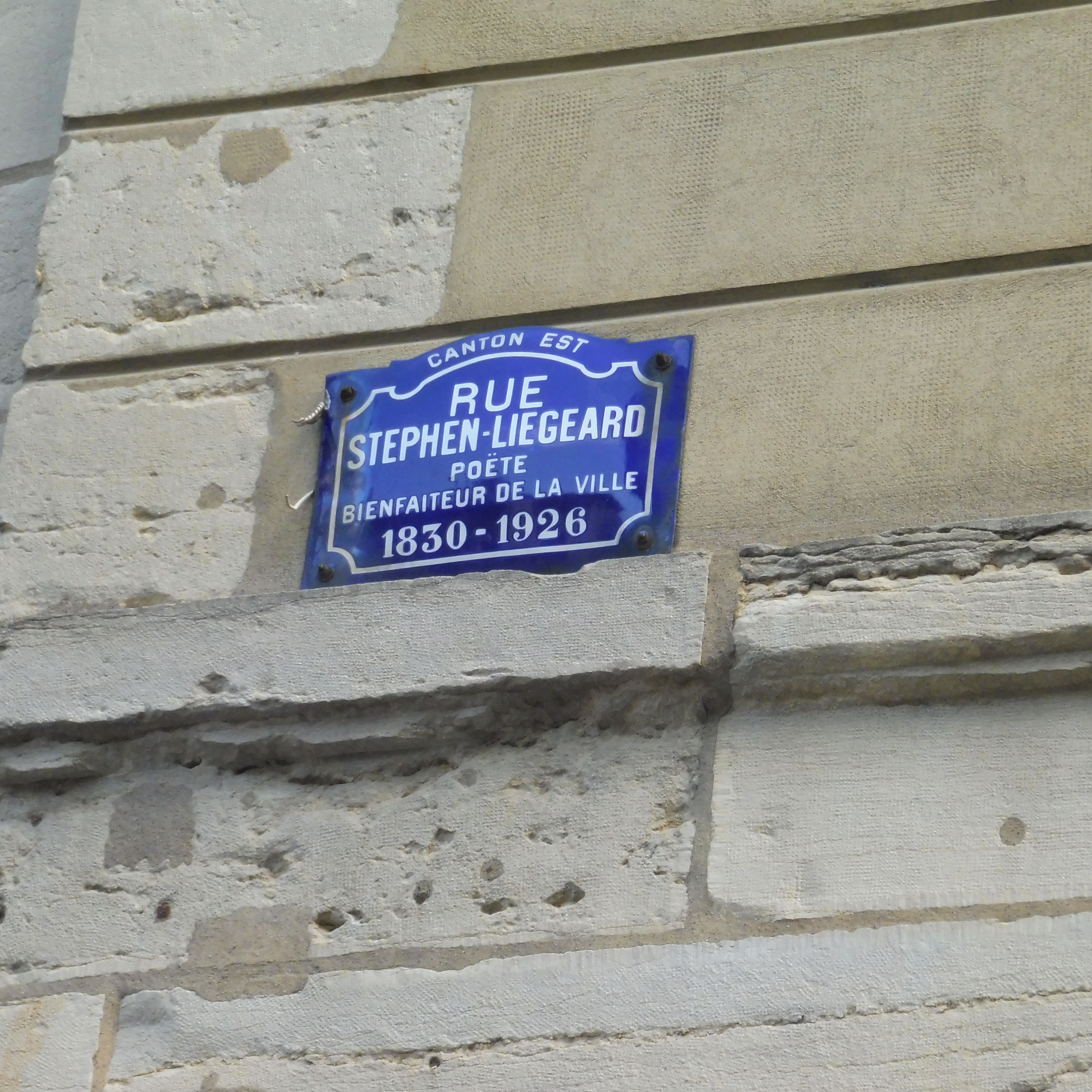
Plaque in Liégeard's honour in Dijon

- Souvenirs de quelques soirées d'été, Dijon, Loireau-Feuchot, 1852, 32 p. [Poèmes, premier recueil édité.]
- De l'origine, de l'esprit et des cas d'application de la maxime Le partage est déclaratif de propriété; Mémoire Couronné par la Faculté de Droit de Dijon, le 15 novembre 1854 dans la Séance solennelle de Rentrée, Dijon, Loireau-Feuchot, 1854, 123 p.
- Les abeilles d'or : chants impériaux, Paris, E. Dentu, 1859, XX-264 p. [Poèmes.]
- Le verger d'Isaure, Paris, Hachette, 1870, XXIII-234 p. [Poèmes.]
- Le crime du 4 septembre, Bruxelles, J. Rozez, 1871, VIII-67 p. [Récit de la chute du Second Empire.]
- Une visite aux Monts Maudits (ascension du Néthou), Paris, Hachette et Cie, 1872, 92 p. [Souvenirs de son ascension en septembre 1871.]
- Trois ans à la Chambre, Paris, E. Dentu, 1873, XII-396 p. [Récit de son mandat de député.]
- Vingt journées d'un touriste au pays de Luchon, Paris, Hachette et Cie, 1874, 556 p.
- Livingstone, Paris, E. Dentu, 1876, 33 p. [Poème, ayant reçu une mention honorable de l'Académie française.]
- À travers l'Engadine, la Valteline, le Tyrol du sud et les lacs de l'Italie supérieure, Paris, Hachette, 1877, VI-491 p.; texte sur Gallica
- Les Grands cœurs, Paris, Hachette et Cie, 1882, II-242 p. [Poèmes, couronnés par l'Académie française en 1894.] Nouvelles éditions en 1883, 1894, 1905.
- Au caprice de la plume, Paris, Hachette, 1884, V-426 p.
- La Côte d'azur, Paris, Maison Quantin, 1887, 430 p. [Prix Bordin décerné par l'Académie française en 1888.] Nouvelle édition : Paris, Ancienne maison Quantin Librairies-imprimeries réunies, 1894, III-626 p. http://gallica.bnf.fr/ark:/12148/bpt6k5698362j/f12.image.r=cote+d'azur
- Rêves et combats, Paris, Hachette, 1892, 243 p.
- Les saisons et les mois, Paris, Ancienne Maison Quantin, [1899], 100 p. [Poèmes.]
- Pages françaises, Paris, Hachette et Cie, 1902, VI-489 p.
- Aimer ! Paris, Hachette, 1906, 209 p. Nouvelle édition : Paris, J. Barreau, 1914, 223 p., avec 116 illustrations de Job. [Poèmes.]
- Brins de laurier, Paris, Hachette et Cie, 1909, 170 p. [Poèmes.]
- Rimes vengeresses, Paris, Hachette, 1916, 180 p. [Poèmes nationalistes.]

== Sources ==
- Bitard, Adolphe (1878), "Liégard, François Emile Stéphen", Dictionnaire général de biographie contemporaine française et étrangère, contenant les noms et pseudonymes de tous les personnages célèbres du temps présent... (in French), M. Dreyfous
- Boyer, Marc (2002), L'Invention de la Côte d'Azur : l'hiver dans le Midi (in French), preface by Maurice Agulhon, Édition de l'Aube, ISBN 2-87678-643-5
- Fromentin, Bertand, L'histoire du château (in French), Lycée Stéphen Liégeard
- Garric, Alain, "Stephen LIÉGEARD La Côte d'Azur", Geneanet (in French)
- "La naissance du Festival de Cannes en 1939", Cannes.com (in French), Ville de Cannes
- Robert, Adolphe; Cougny, Gaston (1889), "Liégard (Stéphen, François, Emile)", Dictionnaire des parlementaires français de 1789 à 1889 (in French)
- Stéphen, François, Emile Liégeard (in French), Assemblée nationale
