= Oscar Comettant =

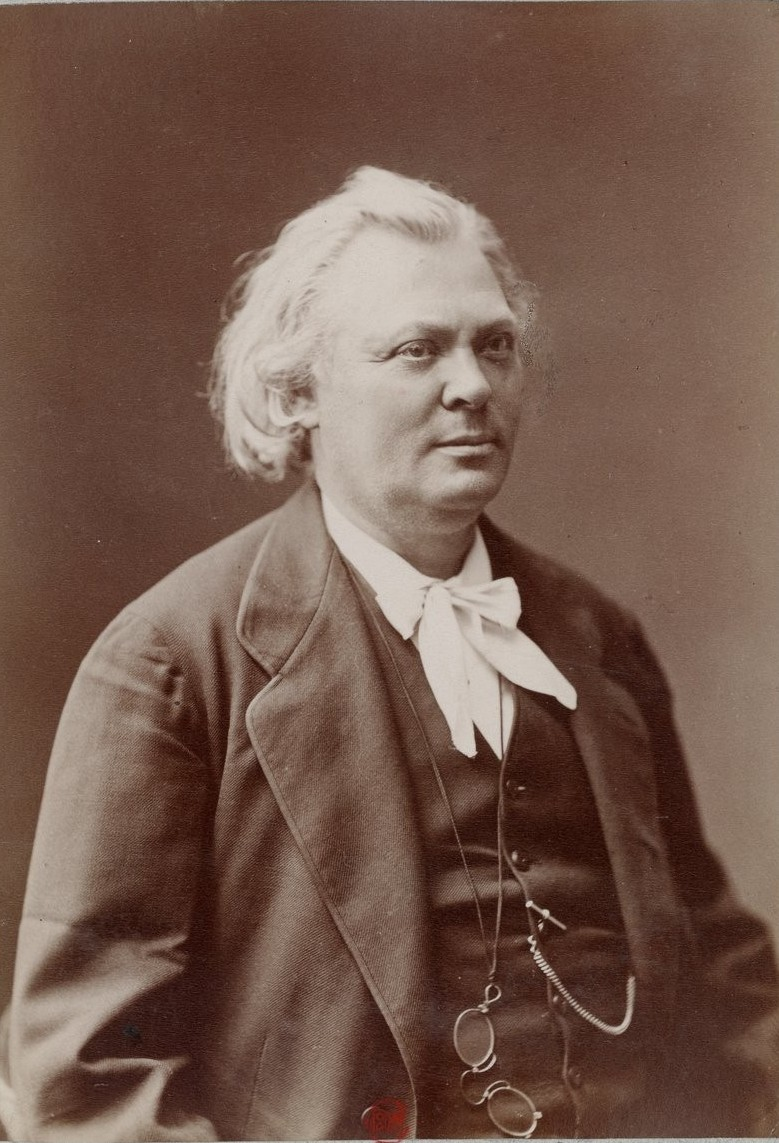
- Born: Oscar Jean-Pierre Comettant; 18 April 1819; Bordeaux
- Died: 24 January 1898 (aged 78); Montivilliers
- Occupations: Composer; Musicologist; Traveler

Oscar Comettant (18 April 1819 – 24 January 1898) was a 19th-century French composer, musicologist and traveller.

== Biography ==
Commettant studied the piano and musical composition at the Conservatoire de Paris (1839–1843) and made a long tour in the United-States from 1852 to 1855 as a soloist.

He left Le Havre on 1 September 1852 and arrived in New York City on the 13th. He then visited the Niagara Falls, Mammoth Cave, saw the Mississippi, Lake Superior, Cedar Creek, among other places.

His circuit began on a steamer on the Hudson River. The train then led him from Albany to Buffalo, with a stop at Niagara Falls. He went to Toronto, Kingston, Mille-Isles, and Montréal, then south to Saratoga and returned to New York where he rested for two weeks.

Comettant later visited Philadelphia, Washington, D.C., Richmond (Virginia), and Charleston, then spent a month in Mobile in a cotton plantation. On his way to New Orleans, he sailed on the Mississippi and went through Vicksburg, Memphis and Louisville, where he took the opportunity to admire Mammoth Cave and ended his journey by Cincinnati and Pittsburgh.

Unlike many travelers, Comettant focused on American society and institutions; the great spaces of nature were indifferent to him. Although very detailed on political life, religions, education etc. and the American cod, his works, where he invented the character of the French painter Marcel Bonneau, were fictional.

In 1855, on his return to France, he became a professor of music; while composing, he worked as a music critic for Le Siècle and Le Ménestrel.

Comettant went again on a journey in 1864 and visited Denmark, then in July 1888 was appointed French juror at the Melbourne Centennial Exhibition (1888) where he arrived 6 September after he left Marseille 1 August.

He visited Lilydale where he met squatters and Indigenous Australians and, in October 1888, the mines of Ballarat and Sandhurst. He also traveled in the Great Western, where he admired the vines before going to Sydney to attend a banquet (December).

After composing his "Salute to Melbourne" for piano, he returned to France on 28 December 1888.

== Publications ==
- 1858: Trois ans aux États-Unis. Étude des mœurs et coutumes américaines
- 1861: Le Nouveau Monde. Scènes de la vie américaine
- 1861: Les Secrets de la mer, short story
- 1862: Physiologie du mal de mer
- 1863: Les Civilisations inconnues
- 1864: L'Amérique telle qu'elle est. Voyage anecdotique de M. Bonneau dans le nord et le sud des États-Unis. Excursion au Canada
- 1864: En vacances
- 1865: En Amérique, en France et Ailleurs
- 1865: Le Danemark tel qu'il est
- 1865: Un Petit rien tout neuf
- 1866: Voyage pittoresque et anecdotique dans le nord et le sud des États-Unis d'Amérique
- 1868: De haut en bas, impressions pyrénéennes
- 1868: Gustave Lambert au Pôle Nord, ce qu'il y va faire
- 1869: De Paris à quelque part
- 1883: Histoires de bonne humeur
- 1890: Au pays des kangourous et des mines d'or. Étude des mœurs et coutumes australiennes, impressions de voyage
- 1895: L'homme et les bêtes, moral studies

== Musicology ==
- 1857: La Propriété intellectuelle au point de vue de la morale et du progrès
- 1860: Histoire d'un inventeur au XIXe siècle. Adolphe Sax, ses ouvrages et ses luttes
- 1862: Musique et musiciens
- 1869: La musique, les musiciens et les instruments de musique chez les différents peuples du monde
- 1870: Les Musiciens, les philosophes et les gaietés de la musique en chiffres
- 1875: Comédies en quatre lignes
- 1875: Francis Planté, portrait musical à la plume
- 1877: Enseignement du piano. Le Guide-mains W. Bohrer. Notice illustrée de deux dessins, explications et conseils sur l'emploi du Guide-mains W. Bohrer
- 1883: Les Compositeurs illustres de notre siècle : Rossini, Meyerbeer, Mendelssohn, Halévy, Gounod, Félicien David
- 1885: Un Nid d'autographes. Lettres inédites recueillies et annotées par Oscar Comettant
- 1889: La Norvège musicale à Paris
- 1890: Histoire de cent mille pianos et d'une salle de concert
- 1891: La Hollande musicale à Paris
- 1894: La musique de la garde républicaine en Amérique
- 1894–1898 La Musique de chambre, 6 vols.

== Compositions ==
- 1841: Un Vieux grognard, Fantastic interlude in one act, lyrics by Théophile Mercier
- 1844: L'Aigle !, imperial quadrille with quartet accompaniment for piano
- 1844: Faisons-nous belle, bolero, lyrics by Adolphe Favre
- 1844: Oh ! si tu le voulais !, romance, lyrics by Louise Colet
- 1844: Un Rayon de Dieu, melody, lyrics by Adolphe Favre
- 1846: Le Chant de la syrène, melody, lyrics by Alfred Des Essarts
- 1846: Jeanne d'Arc, scene and air, lyrics by Alfred des Essarts
- 1846: La Plainte d'Ariane, drama melody for soprano, lyrics by Alfred des Essarts
- 1848: La Danse au bois, ditty, lyrics by Adolphe Favre
- 1848: Marinetta la fiancée, barcarolle, lyrics by Adolphe Favre
- 1849: L'Exilée au Texas, melody
- 1849: Raphaël au tombeau de Julie, melody
- 1850: Élégie pour piano et violon, Op. 35
- 1850: Fantaisie de concert pour piano et violon, Op. 33
- 1851: Andante, scherzo and final for piano. Op. 48
- 1851: École mélodique du jeune pianiste, 12 études récréatives pour former les élèves au style expressif et chantant, op. 55
- 1851: Fantaisie brillante pour piano sur l'Enfant Prodigue, de D. F. E. Auber, Op. 56
- 1851: God Save the queen, caprice for piano. Op. 39
- 1851: Une nuit à Smyrne, oriental fantasy for piano. Op. 42
- 1851: Les petits Oiseaux, three easy waltz for the piano
- 1851: Rule Britannia, fantasy for piano
- 1851: Souvenir de Gisors, waltz for the piano
- 1852: Casilda, small fantasy for piano for small hands. Op. 60
- 1852: Fantaisie brillante sur le Juif errant, de F. Halévy, for the piano. op. 63
- 1852: Fantaisie sur l'opéra Mosquita la Sorcière, de X Boisselot, for piano. Op. 58
- 1852: Le Troubadour du Pérou, eight Spanish romances
- 1852: La Vision, polka mazurka for piano
- 1856: Chanson de l'Oncle Tom, study for piano
- 1856: Appassionato, new study of salon for piano
- 1856: Choral américain, miscellany for piano
- 1856: Élan du cœur, study for piano
- 1856: Rêverie harmonieuse, study for piano
- 1856: Sur le lac, study for piano
- 1857: Banjo, caprice, piano
- 1857: L'Amazone, polka for piano
- 1857: Le Cor de chasse, polka for piano
- 1857: Edda !, polka-mazurka for piano
- 1857: Églantine !, schottisch for piano
- 1857: La Fin du bal !, galop for piano
- 1857: La Noce au village, quadrille for piano
- 1857: Nymphe des nuits, waltz for piano
- 1860: L'Inconstance !, great piano waltz for piano
- 1861: Un ballo in maschera, opéra de Verdi, caprice de Salon for piano
- 1861: Tantum ergo pour voix de baryton ou mezzo-Soprano
- 1861: Le Traîneau !, waltz for piano
- 1862: Alceste, opéra de Gluck, Temple scene arranged for piano
- 1863: Les Nuits de Bohème, characteristic march for the piano
- 1863: La Gamme des amours, variations on a known theme
- 1871: Metz. Hymne de Gaston Hirsch
- 1872: Alsace et Lorraine, march, piano
- 1873: Heures d'harmonie, little pieces for piano
- 1876: La beauté provençale, waltz, piano
- 1879: La Sympathie, sentimental waltz, Op.162
- 1888: Berceuse, piano
- 1888 Chœur nocturne, nocturne, piano
- 1888: Scherzetto pastoral, piano
- 1888: Impromptu-Caprice, piano (1888)
- 1888: Simplesse, piano (1888)
- 1888: Bergerie !, choir for two voices of women, accompanied by piano, lyrics by Oscar Comettant, music by Renaud-Maury
- 1888: Villanelle rythmique, piano
- 1889: Salut à Melbourne !, piano
- 1889: Bagatelle, lyrics and music
- 1889: Le Sydney, sea song (with choir ad libitum)
- 1890: Les cinq cousines, piano
- 1892: Allegro de salon, piano
- 1892: Le petit Trianon, piano
- 1892: Impromptu, piano
- 1892: Rondeau villageois, piano
- 1892: Menuet, piano
- 1892: Christina !, polka mazurka composed for the piano
- 1898 Aux absents, piano
- 1898: Impressions d'une nuit d'été, piano
- 1898: La permission des quintes, piano
- 1898: Trois Méditations musicales pour piano
- 1907: Eoline, piano. Op. 37
- Six études de salon, piano. Op. 32 (undated)
- Fantaisie caprice pour piano sur Zerline ou la Corbeille d'oranges, by D. F. E. Auber. Op. 57 (undated)
- Le Pardon de Ploërmel, de Meyerbeer, transcription-fantasy for piano (undated)

== Bibliography ==
- 1870: Gustave Vapereau, Dictionnaire universel des contemporains, Hachette, p. 428 read on line available at Gallica
- 1995: Malou Haine (1995). 400 lettres de musiciens au Musée royal de Mariemont. Musique, musicologie (in French). Liège: Éditions Mardaga. pp. 448–449. ISBN 2870095783. OCLC 35666301. with an 1860 photograph.
- 1999: Numa Broc, Dictionnaire des Explorateurs français du XIXe siècle, T.3, Amérique, CTHS, p. 86-87
- 2005: Jean Roy, « Comettant (Oscar) », in Marc Vignal (2005). Dictionnaire de la musique (in French). Paris: Larousse. p. 232. ISBN 2-03-505545-8. OCLC 896013420. Vignal2005. Archived from the original on 2016-10-10.
