= Dompierre-sur-Veyle =

Commune in Auvergne-Rhône-Alpes, France

- Commune
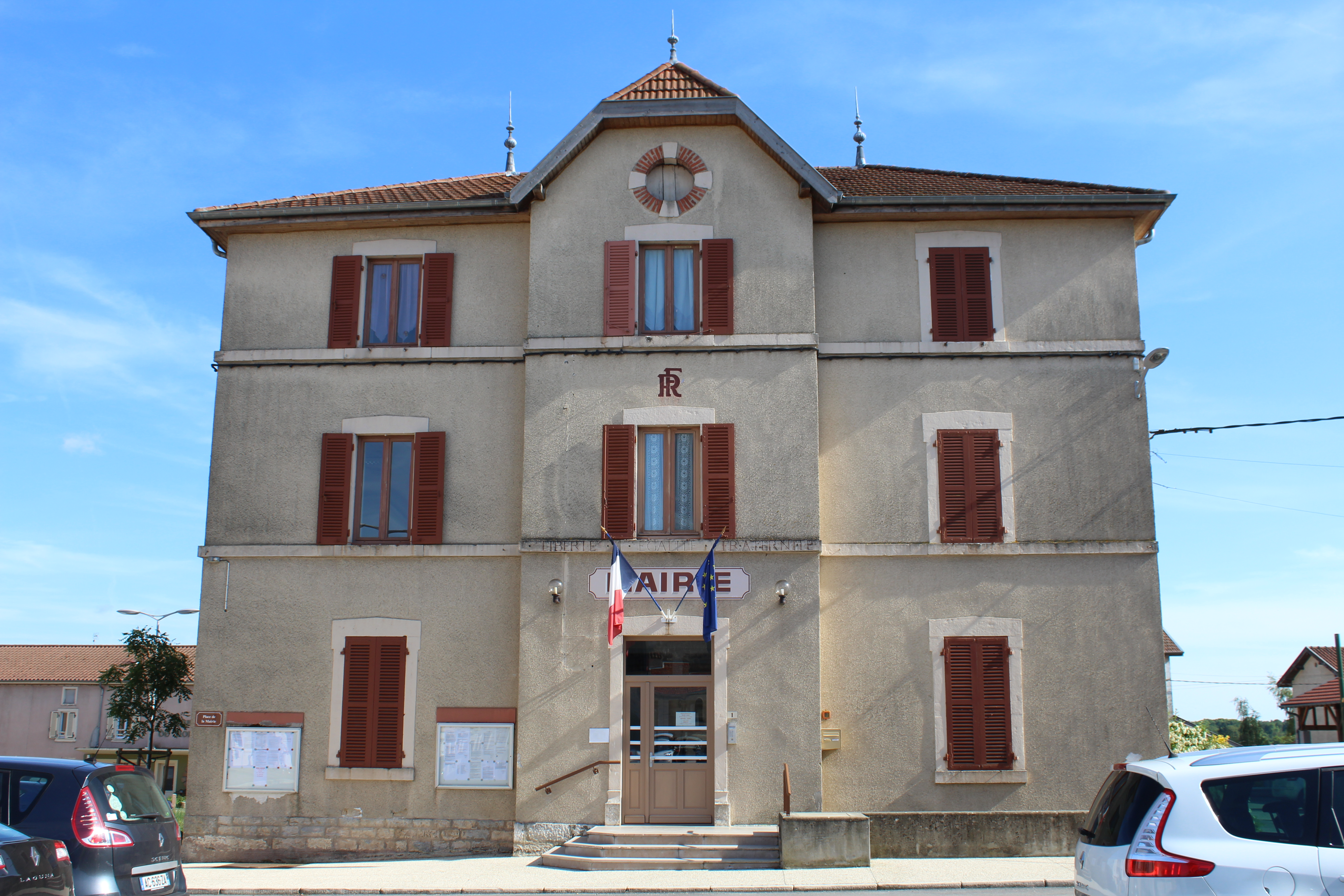
- Town hall
- Location of Dompierre-sur-Veyle
- Location within France Location within Auvergne-Rhône-Alpes
- Coordinates: 46°04′00″N 5°12′00″E
- Country: France
- Region: Auvergne-Rhône-Alpes
- Department: Ain
- Arrondissement: Bourg-en-Bresse
- Canton: Ceyzériat
- Intercommunality: CA Bassin de Bourg-en-Bresse

Government
  - Mayor (2026–32): Martine Tabouret
- Area^{1}: 29.10 km^{2} (11.24 sq mi)
- Elevation: 285 m (935 ft)
- Highest elevation: 312 m (1,024 ft)
- Lowest elevation: 264 m (866 ft)
- Population (2023): 1,245
  - Density: 42.78/km^{2} (110.8/sq mi)
- Time zone: UTC+01:00 (CET)
  - Summer (DST): UTC+02:00 (CEST)
- INSEE/Postal code: 01145 /01240
- ^{1} French Land Register data, which excludes lakes, ponds, glaciers > 1 km^{2} (0.386 sq mi or 247 acres) and river estuaries.

Dompierre-sur-Veyle (French pronunciation: [dɔ̃pjɛʁ syʁ vɛl], literally Dompierre on Veyle) is a commune in the Ain department in eastern France.

== Geography ==
The Veyle forms part of the commune's southwestern border, then flows north through the middle of the commune.

== Population ==
Historical population
Year	Pop.	±% p.a.
1968	662	—
1975	632	−0.66%
1982	745	+2.38%
1990	828	+1.33%
1999	968	+1.75%
2007	1,173	+2.43%
2012	1,192	+0.32%
2017	1,166	−0.44%
2023	1,245	+1.10%
Source: INSEE

== See also ==
- Communes of the Ain department
- Dombes
