= Adolphe Stel =

19th-century French playwright

Adolphe Schaeffer-Stel, known in the theatre under the name Adolphe Stel, was a 19th-century French playwright.

A theater critic, his plays were presented among others at the Théâtre des Délassements-Comiques, the Théâtre du Luxembourg and the Théâtre Beaumarchais.

== Works ==
- 1847: Une Lettre anonyme, one-act comédie en vaudeville
- 1861: La Chasse à ma femme, one-act vaudeville, with Adolphe Favre
- 1864: Les Métamorphoses de Bougival, one-act vaudeville, with Favre
- 1866: Un Monsieur qui a perdu son mouchoir, one-act comédie en vaudeville, with Favre
- 1867: L'Enlèvement au bouquet, one-act comédie en vaudeville
