= Chalamont =

Commune in Auvergne-Rhône-Alpes, France

- Commune
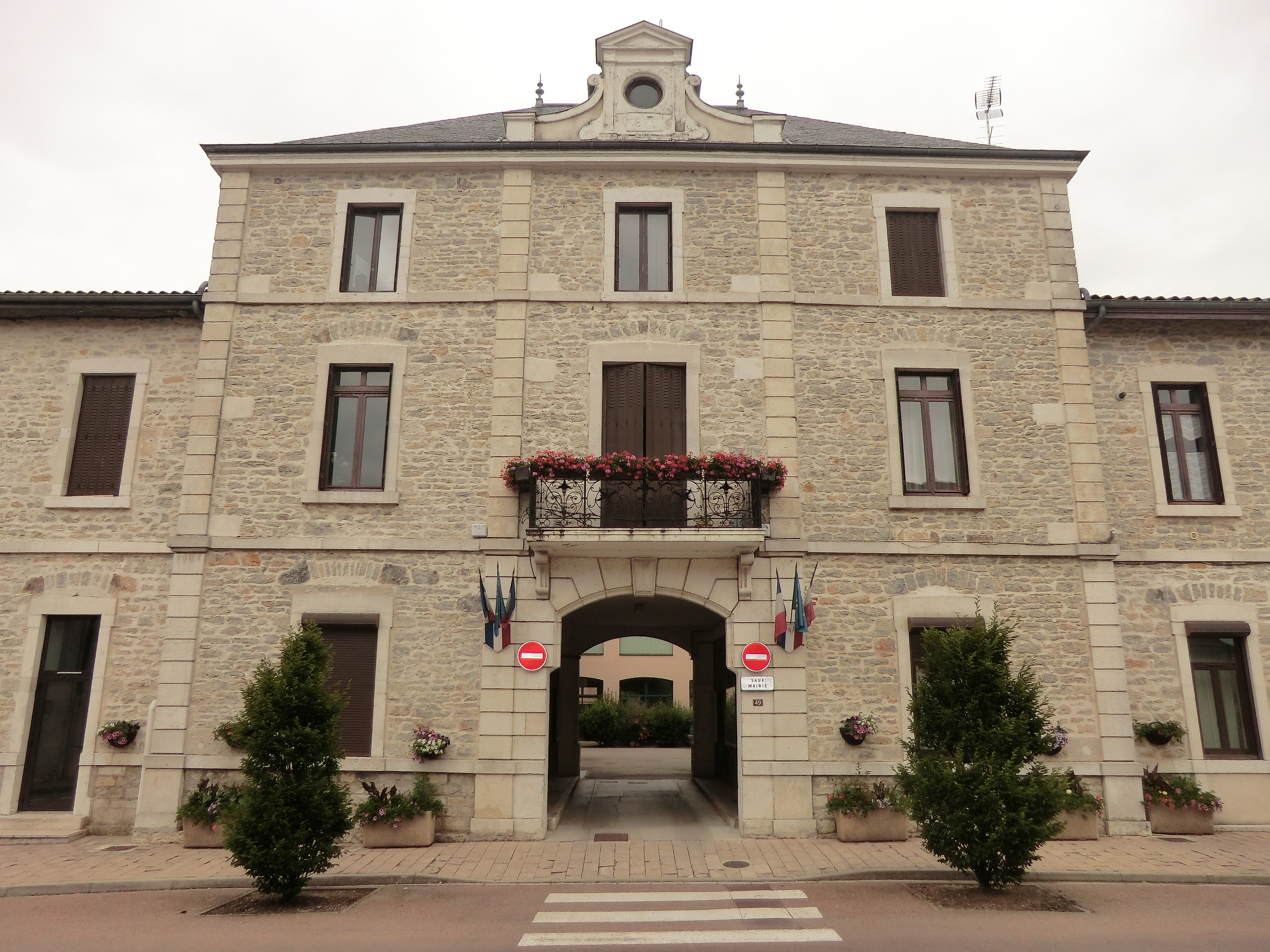
- Town hall

- Coat of arms
- Location of Chalamont
- Location within France Location within Auvergne-Rhône-Alpes
- Coordinates: 45°59′47″N 5°10′19″E
- Country: France
- Region: Auvergne-Rhône-Alpes
- Department: Ain
- Arrondissement: Bourg-en-Bresse
- Canton: Ceyzériat
- Intercommunality: Dombes

Government
  - Mayor (2026–32): Bruno Charvieux
- Area^{1}: 32.88 km^{2} (12.70 sq mi)
- Elevation: 285 m (935 ft)
- Highest elevation: 330 m (1,080 ft)
- Lowest elevation: 269 m (883 ft)
- Population (2023): 2,533
  - Density: 77.04/km^{2} (199.5/sq mi)
- Time zone: UTC+01:00 (CET)
  - Summer (DST): UTC+02:00 (CEST)
- INSEE/Postal code: 01074 /01320
- ^{1} French Land Register data, which excludes lakes, ponds, glaciers > 1 km^{2} (0.386 sq mi or 247 acres) and river estuaries.

Chalamont (French pronunciation: [ʃalamɔ̃]) is a commune in the Ain department in eastern France.

== Geography ==
Chalamont is located in the Dombes, 10 kilometres (6 mi) north of Meximieux, and occupies the highest point on the Dombes plateau.

The Veyle has its source in the western part of the commune, in the Magnenet pond.

== Population ==
Historical population
Year	Pop.	±% p.a.
1968	1,199	—
1975	1,307	+1.24%
1982	1,415	+1.14%
1990	1,476	+0.53%
1999	1,658	+1.30%
2007	2,093	+2.96%
2012	2,402	+2.79%
2017	2,451	+0.40%
2023	2,533	+0.55%
Source: INSEE

== See also ==
- Dombes
- Communes of the Ain department
