= Veyle =

River in eastern France

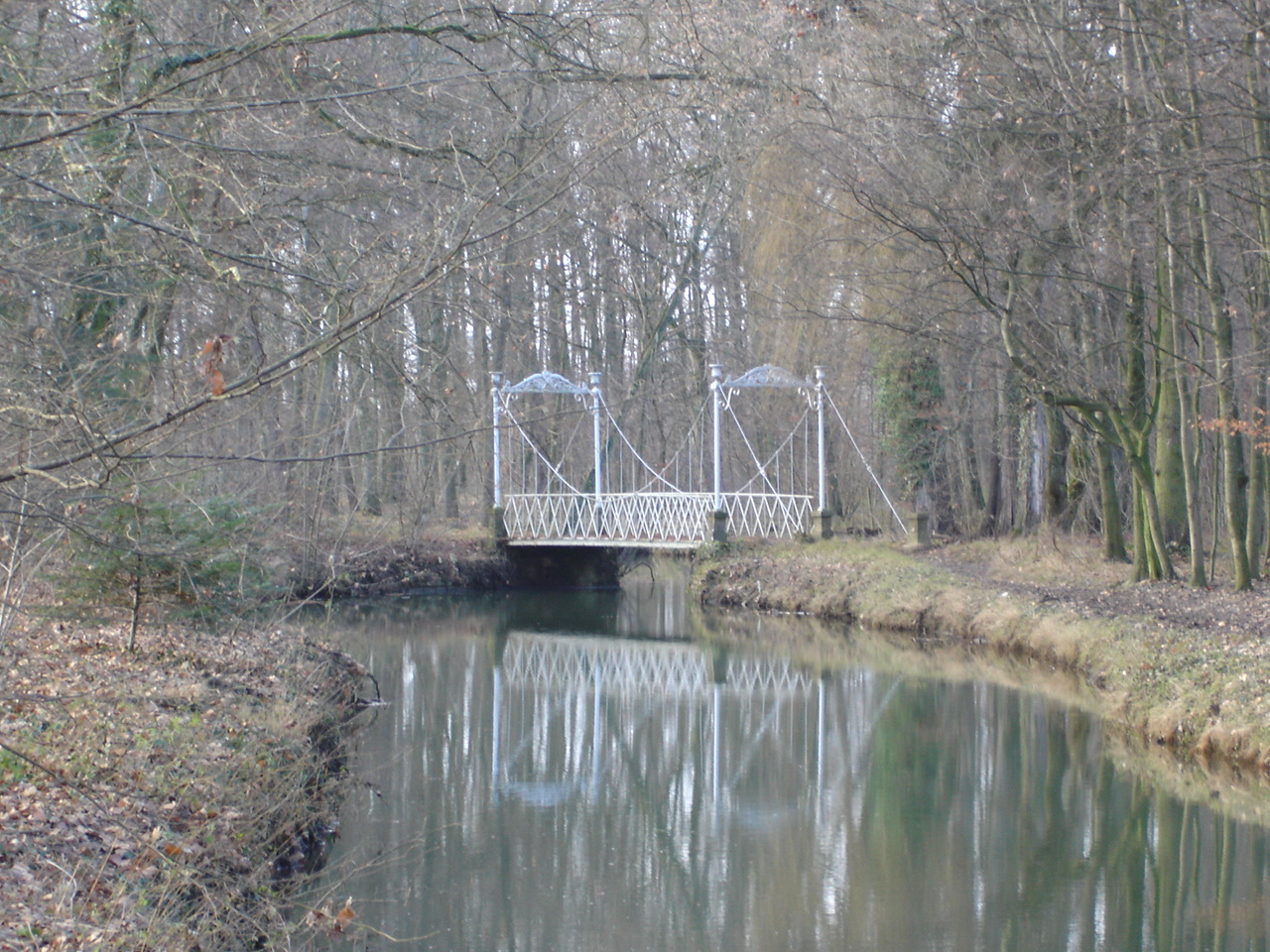
- The Veyle at Pont-de-Veyle

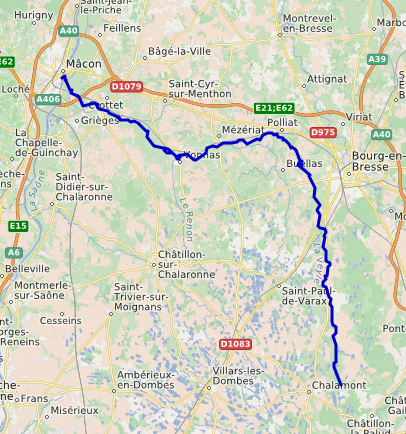
- Course of the Veyle

Location
- Country: France

Physical characteristics
- Source: Magenet pond
  - location: Chalamont
  - coordinates: 46°00′11″N 05°12′36″E
  - elevation: 306 m (1,004 ft)
- Mouth: Saône
  - coordinates: 46°15′39″N 04°50′16″E
  - elevation: 170 m (560 ft)
- Length: 66.8 km (41.5 mi)
- Discharge
  - average: 6.81 m^{3}/s (240 cu ft/s)

Basin features
- Progression: Saône→ Rhône→ Mediterranean Sea
- Tributaries
  - left: Irance, Renon, distributary Petit Veyle
  - right: Menthon, Bief de Pommier, Poches stream

The Veyle (French pronunciation: [vɛl]; Arpitan: Vêla) is a 66.8 km (41.5 mi) long river in the Ain department in eastern France. Its source is in Chalamont. It flows generally northwest. It is a left tributary of the Saône, into which it flows between Grièges and Crottet, near Mâcon.

== Communes along its course ==
This list is ordered from source to mouth:

- Chalamont, Châtenay, Dompierre-sur-Veyle, Lent, Servas, Saint-André-sur-Vieux-Jonc, Péronnas, Saint-Rémy, Saint-Denis-lès-Bourg, Buellas, Polliat, Mézériat, Vonnas, Saint-Julien-sur-Veyle, Biziat, Perrex, Saint-Jean-sur-Veyle, Pont-de-Veyle, Crottet, Grièges
