= Adolphe Favre =

French writer (1808–1886)

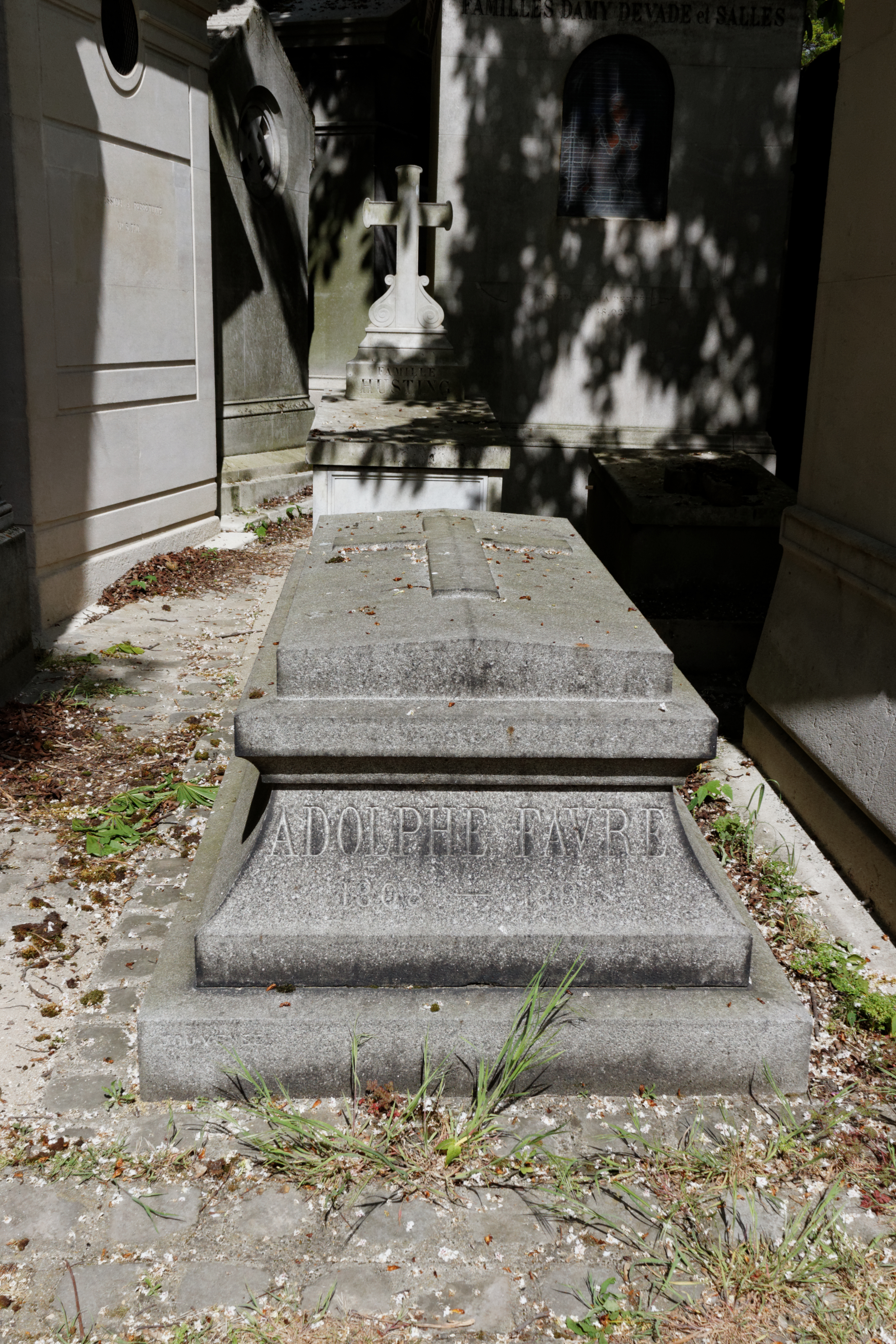
- Adolphe Favre's grave at Père Lachaise Cemetery
- Born: Adolphe Alphonse Favre; 1 May 1808; Lille, France
- Died: 15 January 1886 (aged 77); Paris, France
- Occupations: Playwright; Journalist

Adolphe Alphonse Favre (1 May 1808 – 15 January 1886) was a 19th-century French playwright, journalist, poet and novelist.

Chief editor of the satirical newspaper la Revue parisienne (1851), he was one of the promoters of the retour des cendres of Napoleon, which he asked King Louis-Philippe in his pamphlet L’Homme du rivage ou l’illustre tombeau.

He is buried at Père Lachaise Cemetery (67th division).

== Works ==
- 1844: Faisons-nous belle, boléro, music by Oscar Comettant
- 1852: L'Amour d'un Ange, poetry
- 1855: Le Carrefour de la Croix, novel, 2 vols.
- 1856: L'Amour et l'argent, novel, 2 vols.
- 1859: Le Capitaine des archers, novel
- 1859: L’Œuvre du démon, novel
- 1861: La Chasse à ma femme, one-act comédie en vaudeville, with Adolphe Stel
- 1861: Les Portraits-cartes, one-act comédie en vaudeville, with Paul Faulquemont
- 1863: L’Orfèvre du Pont au Change : ou Paris en 1480, five-act drama, with Faulquemont
- 1864: Les Métamorphoses de Bougival, one-act comédie en vaudeville with Stel
- 1865: La Coupe Maudite, novel
- 1866: La Porte Saint-Denis (1672), five-act drama, with Auguste Villiers
- 1867: Nouvelles de Adolphe Favre, volume 1 : includes Le Bracelet de corail, Le Secret du cœur, Le Mariage au jardin, Le Doigt de Dieu, L'Anneau d'or, Monsieur Landroux
- 1867: L'Enlèvement au Bouquet, one-act comedy, with Stel
- 1868: Nouvelles de Adolphe Favre, volume 2, includes Maître Guillaume, L'Épingle d'or, Le Cœur d'une paysanne, Le Pan de la robe, Le Bouquet de violettes
- 1868: Les Cendres de Napoléon et le Sénat
- 1881: Comment meurent les femmes, novel
- undated: Un Martyr de la victoire, five-act drama, with Faulquemont

== Bibliography ==
- J. F. Vaudin, Gazetiers et gazettes: histoire critique et anecdotique de la Presse parisienne, vol.1, 1860, (p. 138-139)
- Hippolyte Verly, Essai de biographie lilloise contemporaine, 1800-1869, 1869, (p. 91)
- Gustave Vapereau, Dictionnaire universel des contemporains, vol.1, 1870, (p. 658)
- Robert Sabatier, Histoire de la poésie française (XIXe siècle), 1977, (p. 12-13)
