= Saint-Julien-sur-Veyle =

Commune in Auvergne-Rhône-Alpes, France

- Commune
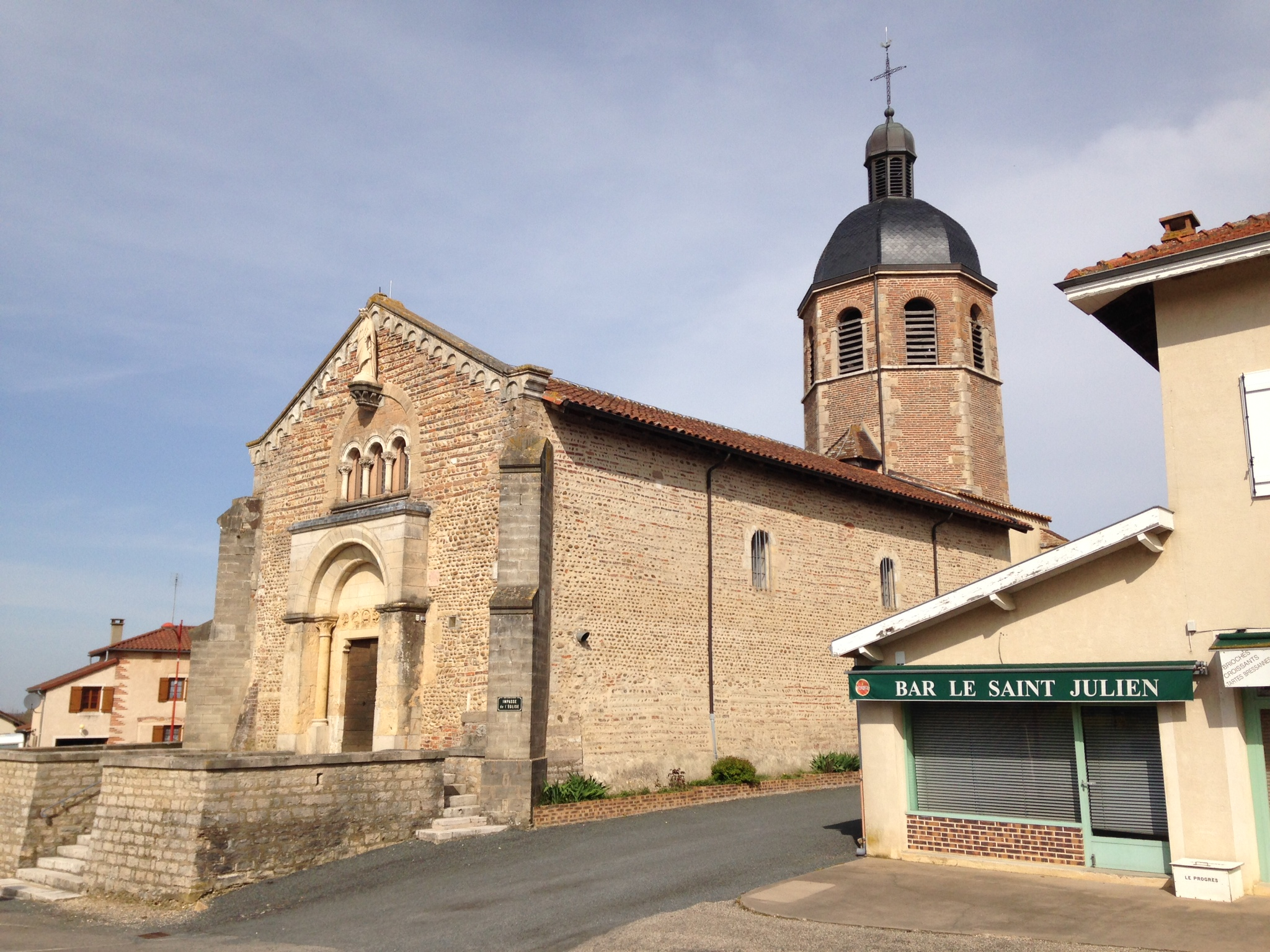
- Location of Saint-Julien-sur-Veyle
- Location within France Location within Auvergne-Rhône-Alpes
- Coordinates: 46°12′N 4°57′E
- Country: France
- Region: Auvergne-Rhône-Alpes
- Department: Ain
- Arrondissement: Bourg-en-Bresse
- Canton: Vonnas
- Intercommunality: CC de la Veyle

Government
  - Mayor (2026–32): Serge Revol
- Area^{1}: 9.8 km^{2} (3.8 sq mi)
- Elevation: 210 m (690 ft)
- Highest elevation: 252 m (827 ft)
- Lowest elevation: 184 m (604 ft)
- Population (2023): 859
  - Density: 88/km^{2} (230/sq mi)
- Time zone: UTC+01:00 (CET)
  - Summer (DST): UTC+02:00 (CEST)
- INSEE/Postal code: 01368 /01540
- ^{1} French Land Register data, which excludes lakes, ponds, glaciers > 1 km^{2} (0.386 sq mi or 247 acres) and river estuaries.

Saint-Julien-sur-Veyle (French pronunciation: [sɛ̃ ʒyljɛ̃ syʁ vɛl], lit. 'Saint-Julien on Veyle') is a commune in the Ain department in eastern France.

== Geography ==
The Veyle forms part of the commune's northern border.

== Population ==
Historical population
Year	Pop.	±% p.a.
1968	440	—
1975	434	−0.20%
1982	511	+2.36%
1990	522	+0.27%
1999	527	+0.11%
2007	647	+2.60%
2012	738	+2.67%
2017	817	+2.05%
2023	859	+0.84%
Source: INSEE

== See also ==
- Communes of the Ain department
