= Fixin wine =

Wine from Burgundy, France

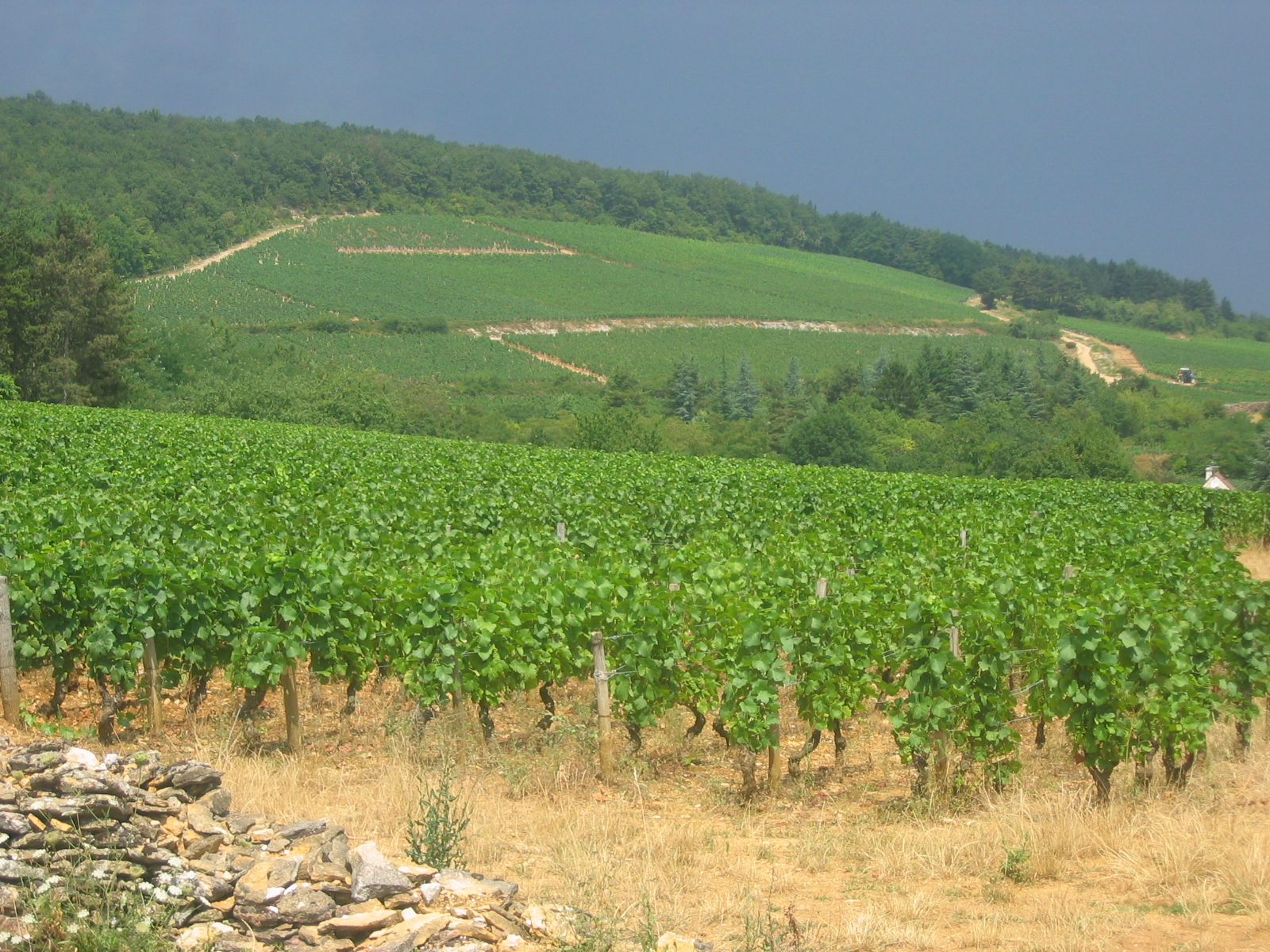
Vineyards in Fixin.

Fixin wine (French pronunciation: [fisɛ̃]) is produced in the communes of Fixin and Brochon in the Côte de Nuits subregion of Burgundy. The Appellation d'origine contrôlée (AOC) Fixin may be used for red and white wine with respectively Pinot noir and Chardonnay as the main grape variety. The production of red wine dominates greatly, with around 96 per cent, and only around four per cent white wine. There are no Grand Cru vineyards with these communes.

== Production ==
In 2008, 96.01 hectares (237.2 acres) of vineyard surface was in production for Fixin at village and Premier Cru level, and 3,958 hectoliter of wine was produced, of which 3,797 hectoliter red wine and 161 hectoliter white wine. Some 3.55 hectares (8.8 acres) of this area was used for the white wines in 2007. The total amount produced corresponds to just over 500,000 bottles of red wine and just over 20,000 bottles of white wine.

== AOC regulations ==
The AOC regulations allow up to 15 per cent total of Chardonnay, Pinot blanc and Pinot gris as accessory grapes in the red wines, but this not very often practiced. For white wines, both Chardonnay and Pinot blanc are allowed, but most wines are likely to be 100% Chardonnay. The allowed base yield is 40 hectoliter per hectare of red wine and 45 for white wine. The grapes must reach a maturity of at least 10.5 per cent potential alcohol for village-level red wine, 11.0 per cent for village-level white wine and Premier Cru red wine, and 11.5 per cent for Premier Cru white wine.

== Premiers Crus ==
There are five climats in Fixin classified as Premier Cru vineyards, of which one straddles the border of the communes of Fixin and Brochon, and the rest are located entirely within Fixin. All these vineyards are located together in the western part of the commune, slightly uphill from the Route des Grands Crus. Their wines are designated Fixin Premier Cru + vineyard name, or as just Fixin Premier Cru, in which case it is possible to blend wine from several Premier Cru vineyards within the AOC.

In 2007, 13.92 hectares (34.4 acres) of the total Fixin vineyard surface consisted of Premier Cru vineyards, of which 13.42 hectares (33.2 acres) red and 0.50 hectares (1.2 acres) white Fixin Premier Cru. The annual production of Premier Cru wine, as a five-year average, is 1,541 hectoliter of red wine and 42 hectoliter of white wine.

- Premiers Crus located within the commune of Fixin: Arvelets, Hervelets, Clos du Chapitre, Clos Napoléon, and Clos de la Perrière.
- Premier Cru located within the commune of Brochon: Clos de la Perrière.
