= Stéphen Liégeard High School =

School in Burgundy, France

Coordinates: 47.238°N 4.972°E

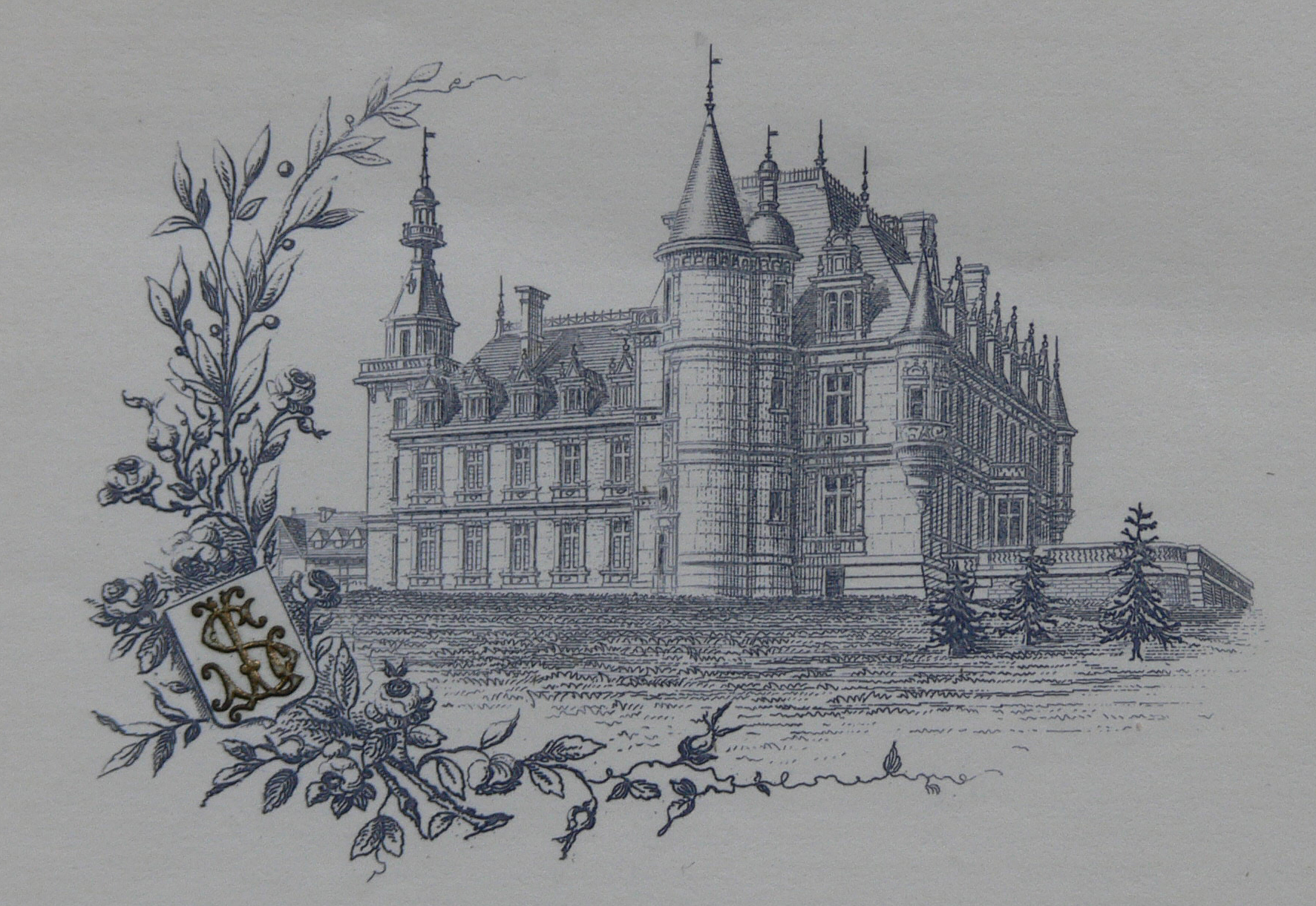
The château of Brochon, represented in Stéphen Liégeard's writing paper.

Stéphen-Liégeard (French: Lycée Stéphen Liégeard) is a French high school located in Brochon, Côte-d'Or, Burgundy. It opened in 1962 and some of its facilities are situated in the Château of Brochon, built by Stéphen Liégeard.

== The facilities ==
This neorenaissance château was built from 1895 to 1899 by Stéphen Liégeard on the model of several châteaux of the Loire Valley, particularly the Château of Azay-le-Rideau. Stéphen Liégeard had a son, Gaston Liégeard, who died in 1953, a childless bachelor. He left the château to his nephew who refused the inheritance; neither did the City of Dijon and the Conseil Général of Côte d'Or accept the building, so the château became the property of the French State, which decided to build a high school on the estate. Today, the lot is composed of the château, the park, a modern teaching building adjoining the boarding part of the school, and a few annexes.

The château used to house a canteen and now houses the female dormitories. Some of its rooms are also used for electives such as drama, art, and music. A former teaching building now houses the infirmary.

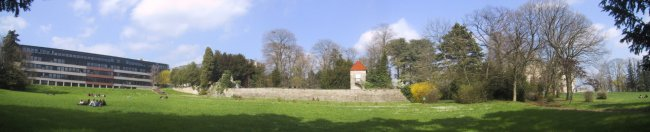
View of Stéphen Liégeard High School

The modern premises, which were built in 1962 along the Route des Grands Crus, are composed as follows :

- the basement which contains 5 classrooms.

- the ground floor with 3 computer rooms, 3 offices and the high school library.

- 3 other floors, which are each composed of 12 classrooms.

- an administrative building.

- co-educational boarding houses which contain 135 places in 2014.

- a self-service restaurant.

- The “Maison des Lycéens” which adjoins those buildings is a place where the students can spend their free time.

The 12-acre park, whose principal entrance is guarded by the concierge's lodge neighboring a little garage, has partly kept its initial design. It includes a rose garden and the Crébillon Pavilion. At its end are the gymnasium and the P.E. grounds. The greenhouse and the vegetable garden disappeared when the new facilities were built. There used to be an orangery and a plantation of fig trees where the administrative building now stands.

== High school history ==
- The high school was created in 1962 by the National Education. First, a female high school, it became coeducational in the 1960s. Until 2006, only girls could use the boarding school. In 1967, the establishment became autonomous and was officially named « Lycée Stéphen Liégeard » (Stéphen Liégeard High School).
- Arnaud Montebourg, a French politician from Fixin, graduated at Stéphen Liégeard High School.
- There have been 9 principals since 1962:

Years	Principal's name
1962 - 1981	Mrs BERAL
1981 - 1985	Mrs VAILLEAU
1985 - 1988	Mrs GRANGE
1988 - 1992	Mr BERNARD
1992 - 1997	Mr THEIS
1997 - 2000	Mrs RABATE
2000 - 2007	Mr GEY
2007 - 2011	Mrs LUSSIANA
2011 -	Mr LANTERNIER

- Evolution of the number of boys and girls since 2004 :

Years	Girls	Boys	Total
2004 - 2005	558	250	812
2005 - 2006	550	271	821
2006 - 2007	524	278	802
2007 - 2008	497	291	788
2008 - 2009	457	271	728
2009 - 2010	418	240	658
2010 - 2011	420	240	660
2011 - 2012	419	243	662
2012 - 2013	424	269	693
2013 - 2014	428	299	727

== The high school today ==
- The number of students has been fluctuating between 650 and 850.
- Girls have always outnumbered boys due to the fact that the boarding facilities had long been for girls only.
- Since 2010, the high school's graduation rates have been higher than the national rate in all the courses.

The high school currently offers the following courses :

- baccalauréat L (literature stream)
- baccalauréat ES (economics and social science stream)
- baccalauréat S (science stream)
- baccalauréat STMG (Management Science and Technology stream)
- HND : management assistant for SMEs / SMIs

The high school also offers electives such as :

- drama
- PE (mountain biking; rock climbing; orienteering)
- art
- music
- Latin
- Greek
- European section with maths, biology or history and geography taught in English

== The Friends of the Château Stéphen Liégeard of Brochon ==
Founded in 1994, this non-profit organization aims to promote the knowledge of this Burgundian piece of heritage and to carry out researches on the Liégeard family. It celebrated the centenary of the Château in 1998. In partnership with the Conseil Régional of Burgundy, Stéphen Liégeard High School and the town of Brochon, this society organizes guided tours of the Château and the park every summer.
