= Saint-Denis-lès-Bourg =

Commune in Auvergne-Rhône-Alpes, France

Saint Denis les Bourg
- Commune
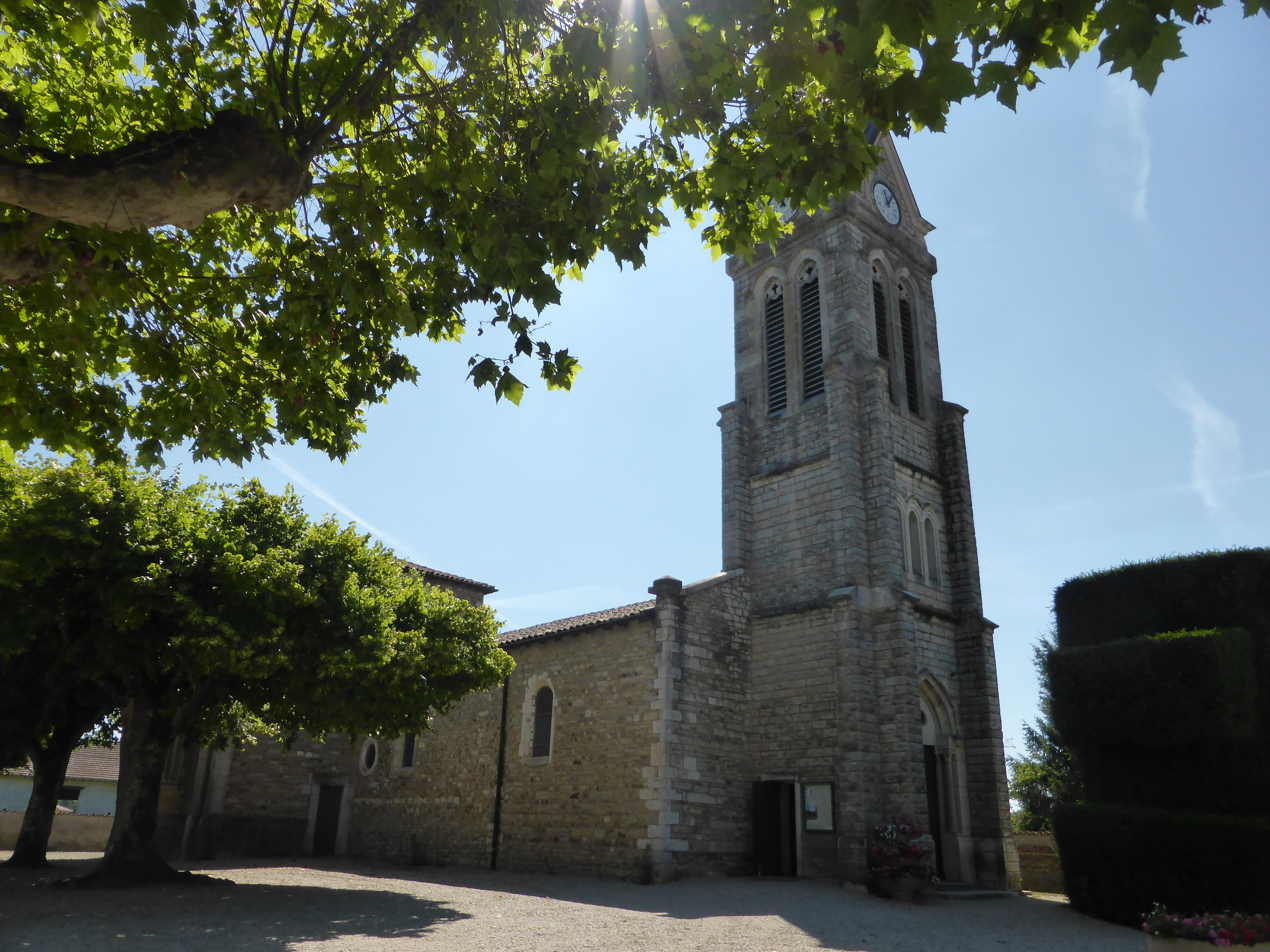
- Church of Saint Denis

- Coat of arms
- Location of Saint Denis les Bourg
- Location within France Location within Auvergne-Rhône-Alpes
- Coordinates: 46°12′09″N 5°11′24″E
- Country: France
- Region: Auvergne-Rhône-Alpes
- Department: Ain
- Arrondissement: Bourg-en-Bresse
- Canton: Bourg-en-Bresse-2
- Intercommunality: Bassin de Bourg-en-Bresse

Government
  - Mayor (2026–32): Guillaume Fauvet
- Area^{1}: 12.58 km^{2} (4.86 sq mi)
- Highest elevation: 242 m (794 ft)
- Lowest elevation: 209 m (686 ft)
- Population (2023): 6,160
  - Density: 490/km^{2} (1,270/sq mi)
- Time zone: UTC+01:00 (CET)
  - Summer (DST): UTC+02:00 (CEST)
- INSEE/Postal code: 01344 /01000
- ^{1} French Land Register data, which excludes lakes, ponds, glaciers > 1 km^{2} (0.386 sq mi or 247 acres) and river estuaries.

Saint-Denis-lès-Bourg (French pronunciation: [sɛ̃ dəni lɛ buʁ], lit. 'Saint-Denis near Bourg') is a commune in the Ain department in eastern France.

== Geography ==
The Veyle forms the commune's western border.

== Population ==
Historical population
Year	Pop.	±% p.a.
1968	2,510	—
1975	3,181	+3.44%
1982	3,352	+0.75%
1990	4,145	+2.69%
1999	4,921	+1.93%
2007	5,101	+0.45%
2012	5,504	+1.53%
2017	5,747	+0.87%
2023	6,160	+1.16%
Source: INSEE

== See also ==
- Communes of the Ain department
