= Brochon =

- Commune
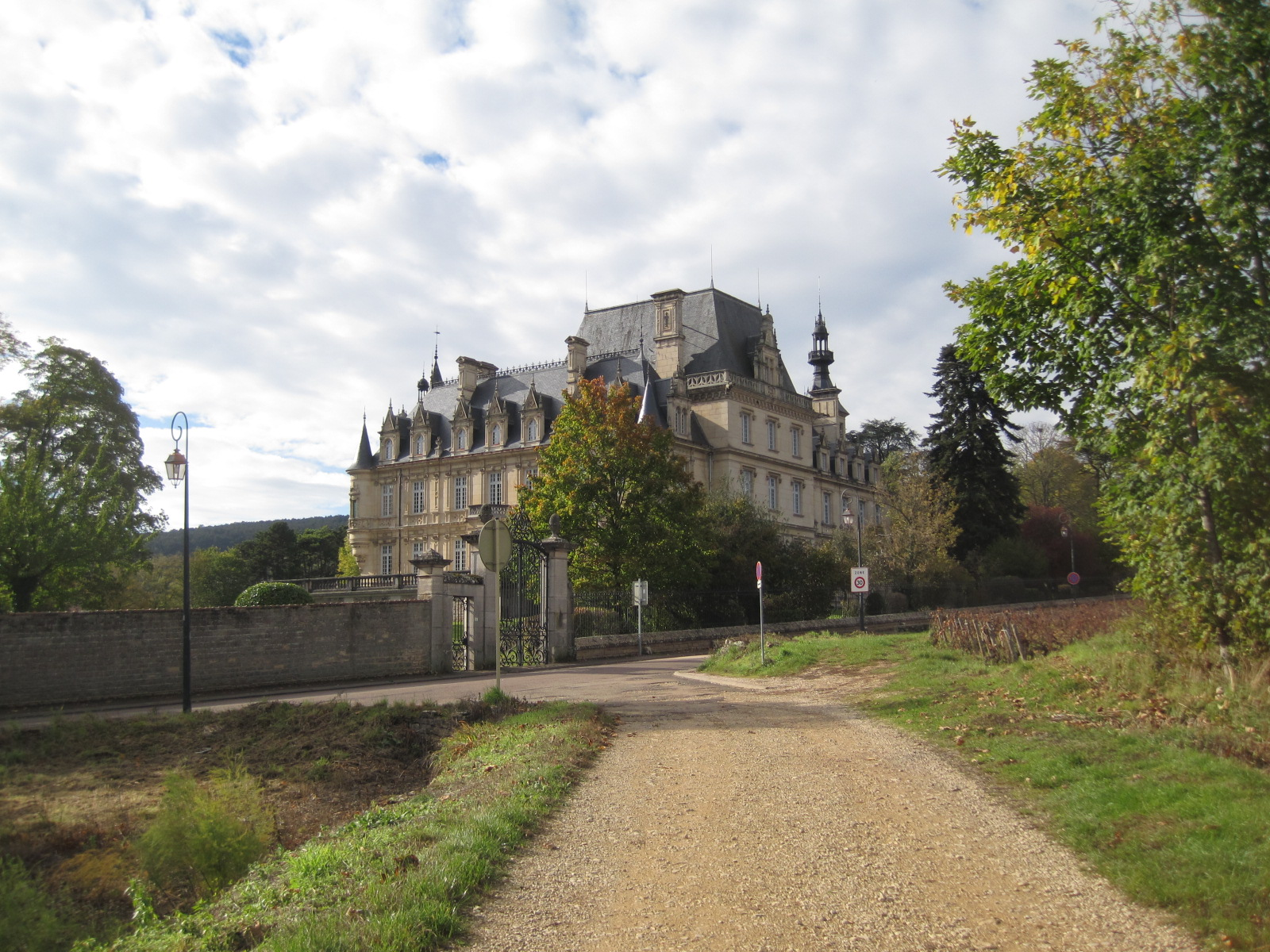
- Chateau

- Coat of arms
- Location of Brochon
- Location within France Location within Bourgogne-Franche-Comté
- Coordinates: 47°14′23″N 4°58′18″E
- Country: France
- Region: Bourgogne-Franche-Comté
- Department: Côte-d'Or
- Arrondissement: Beaune
- Canton: Longvic
- Intercommunality: Gevrey-Chambertin et Nuits-Saint-Georges

Government
  - Mayor (2020–2026): Dominique Dupont
- Area^{1}: 7.46 km^{2} (2.88 sq mi)
- Highest elevation: 546 m (1,791 ft)
- Lowest elevation: 228 m (748 ft)
- Population (2023): 664
  - Density: 89.0/km^{2} (231/sq mi)
- Time zone: UTC+01:00 (CET)
  - Summer (DST): UTC+02:00 (CEST)
- INSEE/Postal code: 21110 /21220
- ^{1} French Land Register data, which excludes lakes, ponds, glaciers > 1 km^{2} (0.386 sq mi or 247 acres) and river estuaries.

Brochon (French pronunciation: [bʁɔʃɔ̃]) is a commune in the Côte-d'Or department in eastern France.

== Population ==
Historical population
Year	Pop.	±% p.a.
1968	550	—
1975	633	+2.03%
1982	609	−0.55%
1990	591	−0.37%
1999	691	+1.75%
2007	651	−0.74%
2012	663	+0.37%
2017	645	−0.55%
2023	664	+0.49%
Source: INSEE

== Wine ==
Some of the vineyards in Brochon are part of the appellation d'origine contrôlée Gevrey-Chambertin, and some are part of Fixin appellation. Most are however only entitled to the Côte-de-nuits-villages (AOC) appellation. There is no Brochon appellation.

== Twin towns ==
Brochon is twinned with:

- Weinolsheim, Germany

== See also ==
- Communes of the Côte-d'Or department
- Stéphen Liégeard High School
