= Gustave Lambert =

French hydrographer

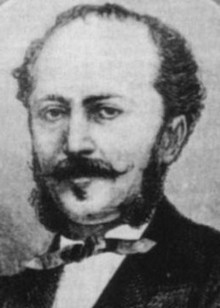
- Born: Marie Joseph Gustave Adolphe Lambert; 1 July 1824; Grièges, Ain, France
- Died: 27 January 1871 (aged 46); Paris, France
- Occupations: Hydrographer and navigator

Marie Joseph Gustave Adolphe Lambert (1 July 1824 – 27 January 1871) was a French hydrographer. He taught for 20 years, then went on a voyage into Arctic seas and conceived the idea of an expedition to the North Pole. He thought that in summer the effect of the constant sunshine (insolation) would be to melt the ice and allow passage to the Pole. The plans had been made, about half the funding had been subscribed, and a ship had been purchased when the project was disrupted by the Franco-Prussian War in 1870. Lambert enlisted in the National Guard and died of wounds at the Battle of Buzenval (1871).

== Early years ==
Gustave Lambert was born in Grièges, Ain, on 1 July 1824. He was the son of Jean-Francois Lambert, a notary from Paris, and Rosalie Blanc. The family moved from Grieges to Priay, Ain, around 1825. In 1835 Gustave's father became a manufacturer of sugar, and later of candles. These businesses were not successful, and in 1840 his father retired to Lyon. Gustave attended the Collège de Bourg, where he is recorded as a pupil of elementary mathematics in 1842 He was admitted to the École Polytechnique in 1843. Due to problems with discipline, he was expelled from the Polytechnique on 23 April 1845.

== Teacher ==
Lambert joined the navy, and became a teacher 4th class of hydrography at Belle-Isle on 21 November 1846. He first went to sea around 1847. On 8 November 1847 he transferred to teach at Fécamp. He was in Paris during the February Revolution of 1848, which he opposed. On 10 October 1848 he was named a teacher at the École Navale in Brest. There he taught differential and integral calculus. On 1 October 1851 he was promoted to teacher 3rd class, and on 3 July 1852 to teacher 2nd class. On 13 September 1856 he moved from the chair of hydrography at Cherbourg to that of Bayonne. He taught hydrography at Bayonne until 1 January 1865, when he was laid off.

== Visit to Bering Strait ==
Louis Vivien de Saint-Martin described Lambert as both a man of action and a man of science. Soon after losing his job in 1865 Lambert went to sea as a passenger on a French whaling ship bound for the arctic seas. During the voyage the captain died and Lambert took command. He explored the north of the Bering Strait in 1865. He was in charge of rough and undisciplined seamen in difficult and poorly charted waters, but found time to compose a paper on the Lois de l'insolation (Laws of solar irradiance) which was communicated in abbreviated form to the Academy of Sciences on 28 January 1867. He noted that while sea temperatures were relatively stable in the tropics, they fluctuated much more widely towards the poles. He also observed that icebergs were born on land and died in the ocean, while ice fields were formed and dissolved at sea.

== Concept of the journey to the North Pole ==
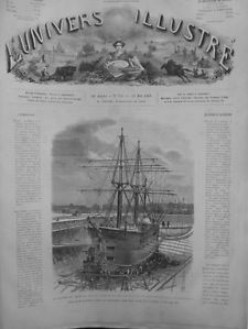
1869 L'Univers illustré: The Boreal ship for the North Pole expedition

It was around this time that Lambert began to think about an expedition to the North Pole. He outlined his plan later, for an expedition with about 15 sailors and scientists:

One would have to leave in the winter, and reach the Pacific Ocean by way of Cape Horn or the Cape of Good Hope, cross the ocean from south to north, pass the Bering Straits, reach the Polynya, open water found recently by the navigators Herold and Plower. (Note: Herold et Plower: The British naval vessels Herald and Plover had spent time in the Bering Strait and along the Arctic shore of Alaska, then a Russian territory, for several years after 1848. Ostensibly they were searching for survivors of the Franklin's lost expedition, but the Russians suspected the British had geopolitical motives.) One would have to get there for several days to follow the path of Wrangel (Note: Wrangel: Ferdinand Petrovich baron Wrangel, author of Narrative of an Expedition to the Polar Sea: In the Years 1820, 1821, 1822 & 1823. He noted that in the Arctic ocean between continental Asia and the New Siberian Islands there was a narrow strip of open water between the shore and the ice in summer, and the main body of ice was broken into fields and floes, with lanes of open water between them, which remained until the first frost of autumn.) and then reach the pole. One would have to spend the winter with the Eskimos, in ice huts, and when summer returned move on and eventually return to France after several years of absence.

Samuel Richard Van Campen wrote in 1878 of the plan,

It was conceived, it is only just to say, in complete ignorance, as M. Malte-Brun tells us, of the projects of Osborn and Petermann, and the ground over which it would be necessary to proceed was suggested to the projector by the sight of the thin ice covering the Polar Sea to the north-west of Behring's Straits, about 73° N., promising apparently a passage to the mariner bold enough to advance right through it, together with the appearance of the physical state of the sea in those high latitudes, the probable effect of insolation, and, finally, the information he was able to draw from the scattered traditions of Arctic navigators.

== Publicity, planning and fundraising ==
In December 1866 Lambert gave an outline of his plans to the Société de géographie of Paris. Lambert described the whole history of Arctic exploration, gave the scientific grounds for his plan, and described the importance of a French expedition through the Bering Straits. He insisted that there was open sea to the northwest of the straits in the direction of the Pole, and said that insolation during the Arctic summer and favorable currents would make it possible to avoid the barriers of broken ice that had blocked the passage in the past. On 4 July 1867 Lambert wrote to M. de Quatrefages, President of the Council of the Geographical Society, praising the "heureux point de départ acquis à la question du Pôle Nord" created by the formation of a Committee of Patronage. Committee members included Antoine Thomson d'Abbadie, Jacques Babinet, Jean-Baptiste Élie de Beaumont, Edmond Becquerel, Gabriel Auguste Daubrée, Gaétan Delaunay, Hervé Faye, Charles Joseph Sainte-Claire Deville, Paul-Auguste-Ernest Laugier, Claude-Louis Mathieu, Louis Ferdinand Alfred Maury and Jean Louis Armand de Quatrefages de Bréau.

On 20 December 1867 Lambert spoke at more length to the Société de géographie and described his plans for the proposed polar voyage and the research he wanted to undertake. He presented his plan in other parts of France, for example to an audience of 4,000 people in the hall of the Bourse de Bordeaux on 19 February 1868. His letters were published in l'Economiste Français and reproduced in La Gironde. On 14 and 28 February 1870 Lambert described to the Académie française how he proposed to measure the flattening of the earth at the pole by measuring the meridian arc and by timing the duration of oscillation of a pendulum of fixed length. He would make other measurements such as air pressure, magnetism and the northern aurora. August Heinrich Petermann, director of the Gotha Geographical Review, wrote from Germany to the Société de géographie expressing his approval of the plan.

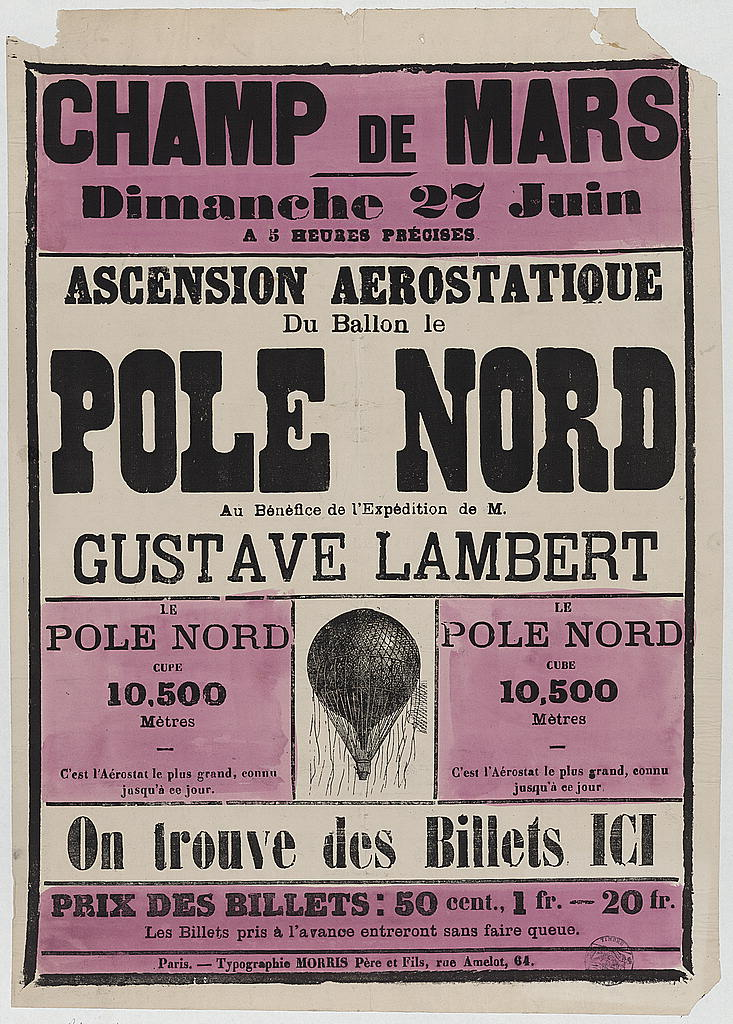
Poster advertising the ascent of the Pôle Nord, 27 June 1869

Lambert estimated that the cost would be 600,000 francs, and sought funding from all sources. The Marquis Prosper de Chasseloup-Laubat, former Minister of the Marine and President of the Geographical Council, joined with de Quatrefages in presenting the project to the Emperor. Napoleon III placed his name at the head of the list of subscribers, promising 50,000 francs. The Corps législatif voted 150,000 francs. Lambert tried to engage the public imagination by floating a huge airship, the Pôle Nord, from the Champ de Mars. The vaudeville performers and caricaturists took to the project, but the general public remained indifferent.

However, having raised about 300,000 francs Lambert bought a ship that he named the Boréal which he docked at Le Havre. He published a circular in which he announced that the Boreal was waiting to leave from the Vauban basin at Le Havre, and could depart in a matter of weeks rather than months. All that was needed was a contribution of about 6,000 francs from each department. The Seine-Inférieure had already given 23,000 francs. Donations had been received from Paris, 46,000 francs; Lyon, 17,000 francs; le Havre, 8,000 frances; Rouen, 7,000 francs. On 14 July 1870 the Corps législatif voted a supplementary credit of 100,000 francs for the expedition to the North Pole. When the war with Prussia broke out Lambert had raised almost 400,000 francs. He had started to outfit his ship for the Arctic, had hired a skillful sailor as his deputy, had hired several other people but did not have enough money to continue.

== Death and legacy ==
The Franco-Prussian War broke out on 19 July 1870 when Lambert was in Bordeaux. Although he was 46 years old, he joined a company of francs-tireurs. His company left Bordeaux on 29 September for Tours, then was sent to the east. Lambert felt he would be more useful in Paris, which he reached before it was besieged. He was first named captain of the 85th battalion of the National Guard, then Colonel d'état-major. At the start of December 1870 he turned down the title of Colonel of the Veterans of the National Guard, and enlisted with the 119th Infantry Regiment. On 21 December 1870 he was made a sergeant. He was serving with the 119th infantry when he was mortally wounded in Buzenval Park. He was treated by the surgeon Auguste Nélaton, who was optimistic about his chances, but died at 3:00 in the afternoon.

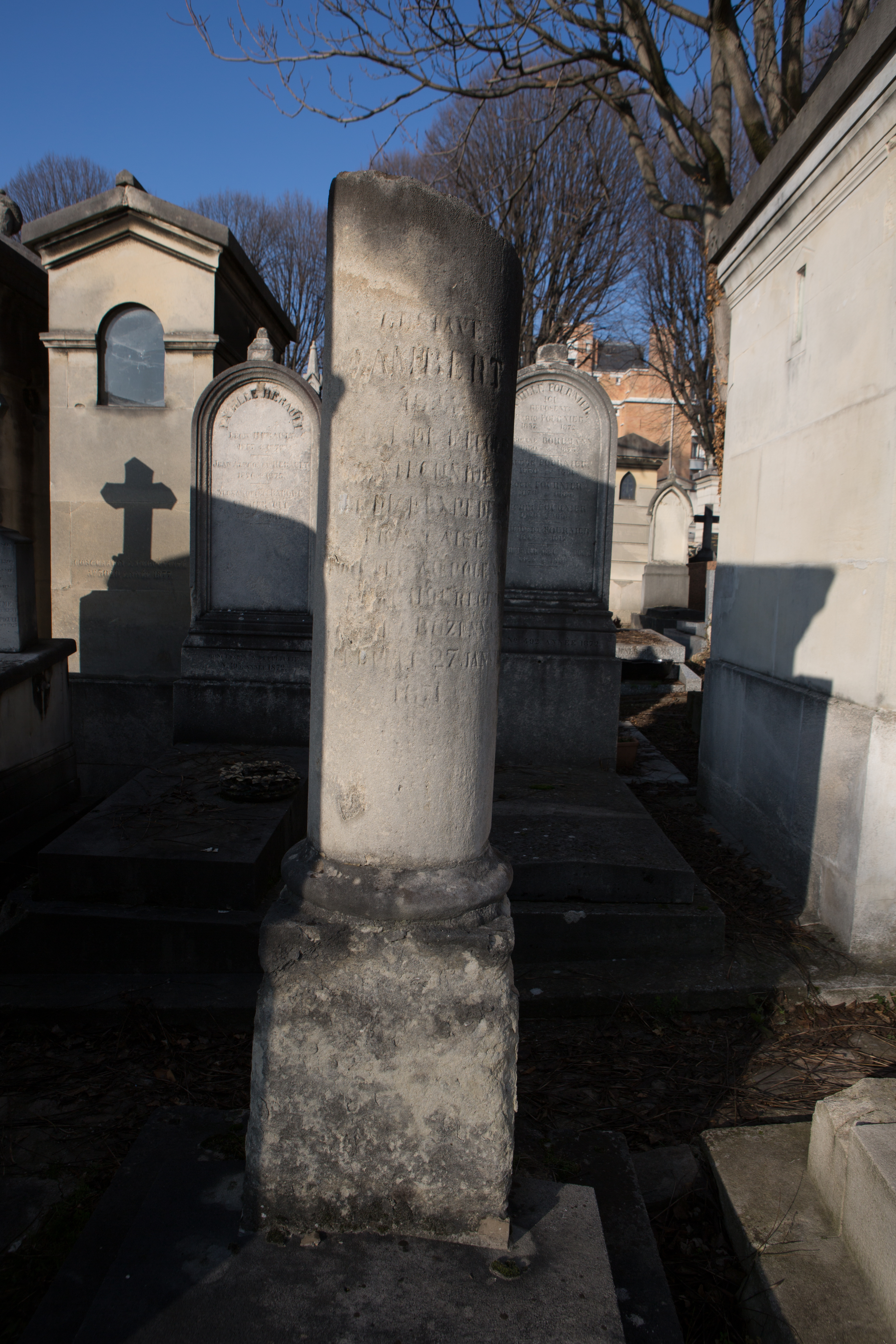
Lambert's grave in Père Lachaise Cemetery

At the time of Lambert's death on 19 January 1871 it was already clear that France's capitulation was inevitable. His funeral was held on 30 January 1871, when his body was taken to the Père Lachaise Cemetery. A bronze bust of the explorer was placed on his tomb. Some time before 1895 the body was exhumed and taken to a plot provided by the city of Paris, with the bust replaced by a broken column. A monument was erected to Lambert in the Père Lachaise Cemetery in January 1924.

== Publications ==
Publications by Gustave Lambert include:

- Gustave Lambert (1866), "Project of a trip to the North Pole, note read to the Society of Geography, in its meeting ... of December 14, 1866", Bulletin of the Society of Geography, Paris: impr. from E. Martinet", Bulletin de la Société de géographie, Paris: impr. de E. Martinet: 15
- Gustave Lambert (1867), "La Question du Pôle Nord, lettres adressées à M. Jules Duval, vice-président de la Société de géographie, directeur de l'"Économiste français"", L'Économiste Français, Paris: A. Bertrand: 48
- Gustave Lambert (1868), "L'Expédition au Pôle Nord, par Gustave Lambert, chef de l'expédition. Assemblée générale du 20 décembre 1867", Bulletin de la Société de géographie, Paris: Société de géographie: 134

== Sources ==
- Black, Lydia (2004), Russians in Alaska, 1732–1867, University of Alaska Press, ISBN 978-1-889963-04-4
- Dublet, E. (1919–1921), "Gustave LAMBERT : Son project de voyage au pôle: Sa mort", Annales de la Société d'émulation, agriculture, lettres et arts de l'Ain Auteur (in French), Société d'émulation (Ain)
- Gustave Lambert (1814–1871) (in French), BnF: Bibliotheque nationale de France
- Malte-Brun, M.V.A., ed. (1870), Annales des voyages, de la geographie, de l'histoire et de l'archeologie (in French), Challamel Aine
- Markham, Clements Robert (1876), Les abords de la région inconnue; histoire des voyages dʼexploration au Pole Nord (in French), A la librairie géographique
- Messimy, Adolphe (19 January 1924), "Discours de M. le General Messimy, Senateur de l'Ain, a l'inauguration de Monument funeraire de Gustave LAMBERT as Cimetiere du Pare-Lachaise", Annales de la Société d'émulation, agriculture, lettres et arts de l'Ain (in French)
- Read, Charles; Faucou, Lucien, eds. (1935), "L'Explorateur Gustave Lambert", L'Intermédiaire des chercheurs et curieux ... (in French), Paris: B. Duprat
- Van Campen, Samuel Richard (1878), The Dutch in the Arctic Seas, Trübner & Company
- Wrangel, Ferdinand Petrovich (1861), "Preface", Narrative of an Expedition to the Polar Sea, in the Years 1820, 1821, 1822, & 1823, Harper and brothers
