= Grièges =

Commune in Auvergne-Rhône-Alpes, France

- Commune
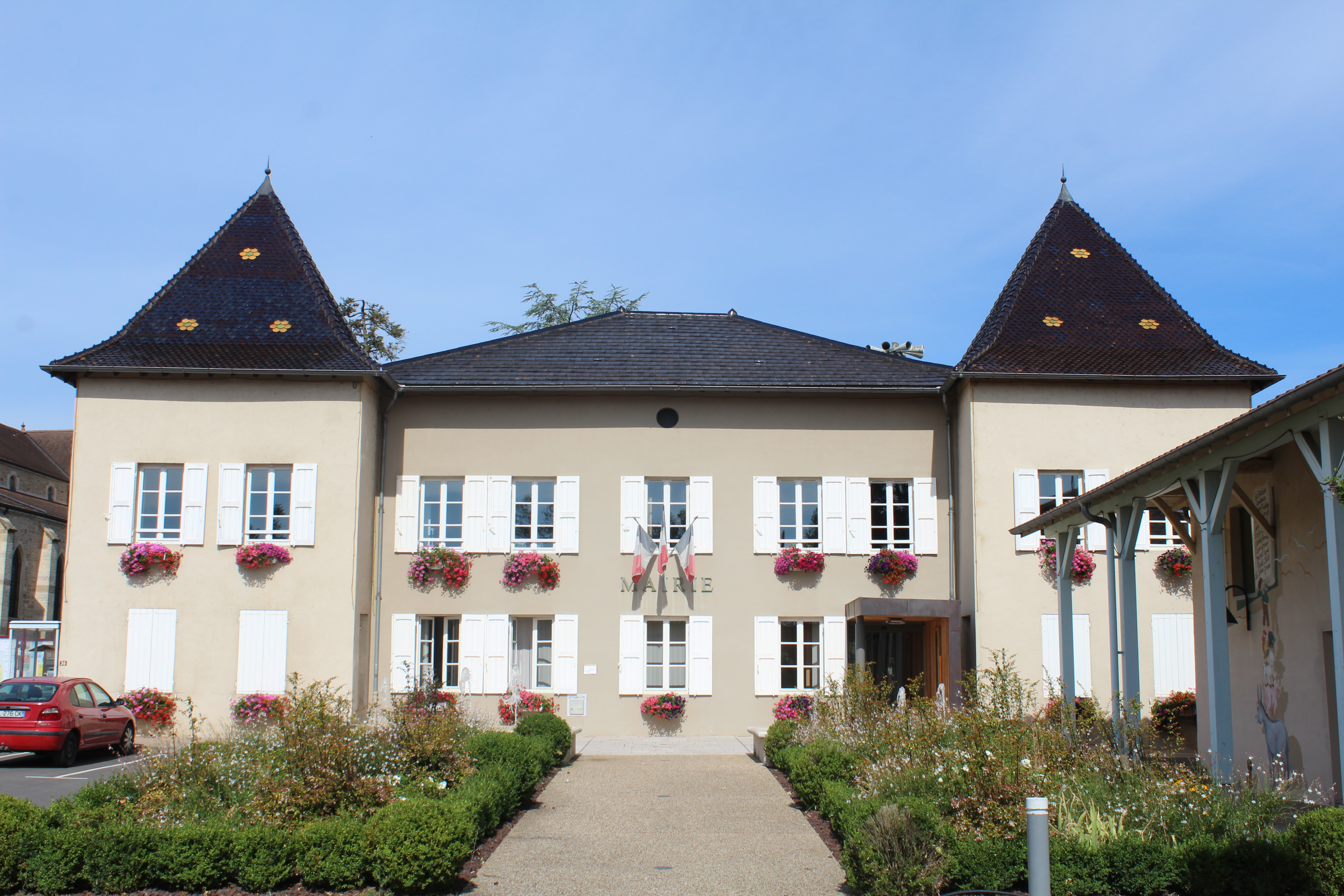
- Town hall

- Coat of arms
- Location of Grièges
- Location within France Location within Auvergne-Rhône-Alpes
- Coordinates: 46°15′20″N 4°51′04″E
- Country: France
- Region: Auvergne-Rhône-Alpes
- Department: Ain
- Arrondissement: Bourg-en-Bresse
- Canton: Vonnas
- Intercommunality: Veyle

Government
  - Mayor (2026–32): Annick Grémy
- Area^{1}: 14.87 km^{2} (5.74 sq mi)
- Elevation: 268 m (879 ft)
- Highest elevation: 212 m (696 ft)
- Lowest elevation: 169 m (554 ft)
- Population (2023): 1,910
  - Density: 128/km^{2} (333/sq mi)
- Time zone: UTC+01:00 (CET)
  - Summer (DST): UTC+02:00 (CEST)
- INSEE/Postal code: 01179 /01290
- ^{1} French Land Register data, which excludes lakes, ponds, glaciers > 1 km^{2} (0.386 sq mi or 247 acres) and river estuaries.

Grièges (French pronunciation: [ɡʁijɛʒ]; Arpitan: Grièjo) is a commune in the Ain department in eastern France.

== Geography ==
The Veyle forms most of the commune's northern border, then flows into the Saône, which forms the commune's western border.

== Population ==
Historical population
Year	Pop.	±% p.a.
1968	1,108	—
1975	1,286	+2.15%
1982	1,423	+1.46%
1990	1,606	+1.52%
1999	1,598	−0.06%
2007	1,751	+1.15%
2012	1,943	+2.10%
2017	1,876	−0.70%
2023	1,910	+0.30%
Source: INSEE

== See also ==
- Communes of the Ain department
