= Saint-André-sur-Vieux-Jonc =

Commune in Auvergne-Rhône-Alpes, France

Saint-André-sur-Vieux-Jonc Sent-André-la-Panossa (Arpitan)
- Commune
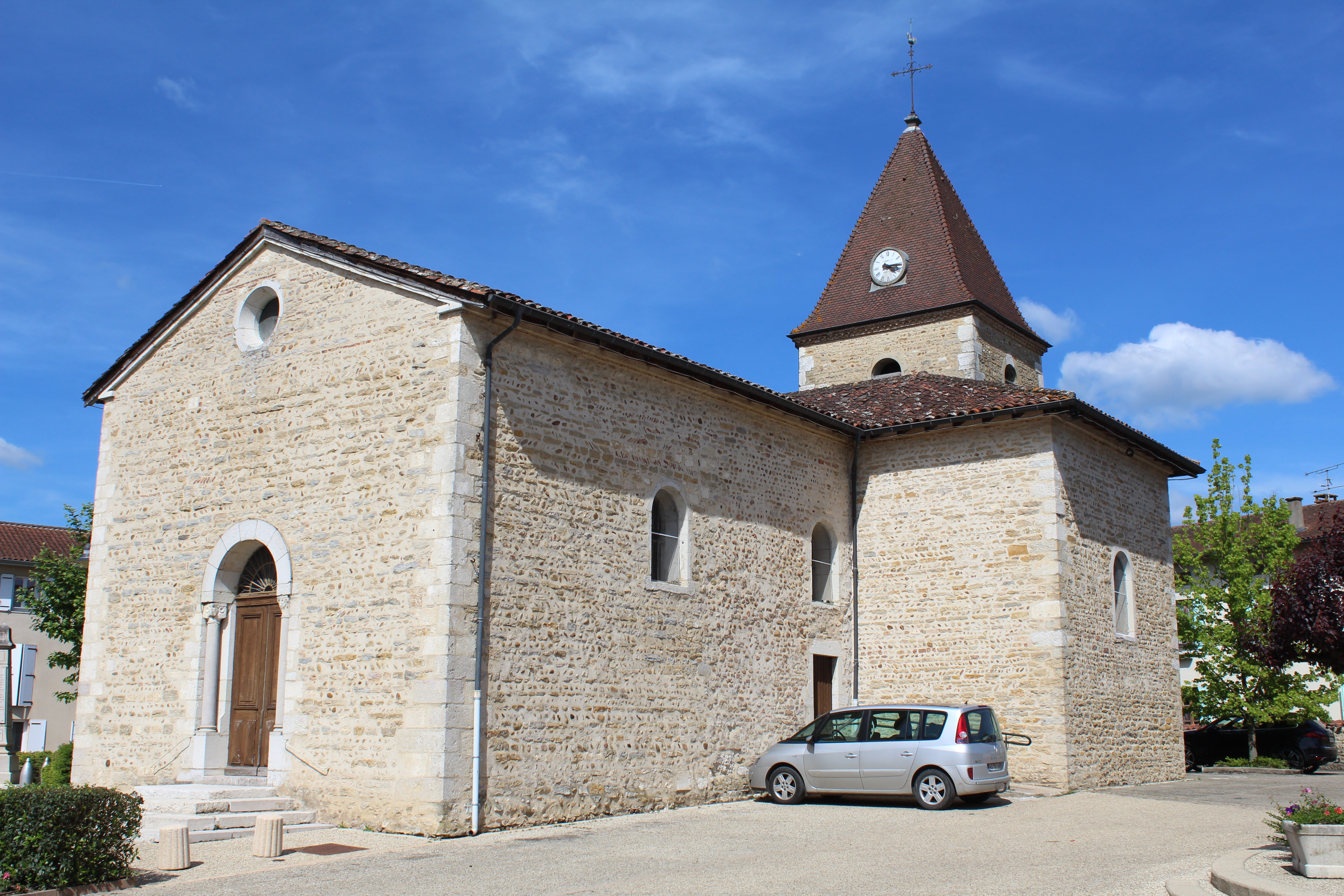
- Location of Saint-André-sur-Vieux-Jonc
- Location within France Location within Auvergne-Rhône-Alpes
- Coordinates: 46°09′27″N 5°08′50″E
- Country: France
- Region: Auvergne-Rhône-Alpes
- Department: Ain
- Arrondissement: Bourg-en-Bresse
- Canton: Ceyzériat
- Intercommunality: CA Bassin de Bourg-en-Bresse

Government
  - Mayor (2020–2026): Bernard Quivet
- Area^{1}: 24.22 km^{2} (9.35 sq mi)
- Highest elevation: 269 m (883 ft)
- Lowest elevation: 222 m (728 ft)
- Population (2023): 1,229
  - Density: 50.74/km^{2} (131.4/sq mi)
- Time zone: UTC+01:00 (CET)
  - Summer (DST): UTC+02:00 (CEST)
- INSEE/Postal code: 01336 /01960
- ^{1} French Land Register data, which excludes lakes, ponds, glaciers > 1 km^{2} (0.386 sq mi or 247 acres) and river estuaries.

Saint-André-sur-Vieux-Jonc (Arpitan: Sent-André-la-Panossa [sɛ̃t ã.ˈdre la pa.ˈnɔ.sə]) is a commune in the Ain department in eastern France.

== Geography ==
The Veyle forms most of the commune's northeastern boundary.

== Population ==
Historical population
Year	Pop.	±% p.a.
1968	543	—
1975	701	+3.72%
1982	887	+3.42%
1990	979	+1.24%
1999	965	−0.16%
2007	1,006	+0.52%
2012	1,118	+2.13%
2017	1,147	+0.51%
2023	1,229	+1.16%
Source: INSEE

== See also ==
- Dombes
- Communes of the Ain department
