= Saint-Rémy, Ain =

Commune in Auvergne-Rhône-Alpes, France

Saint-Rémy
- Commune
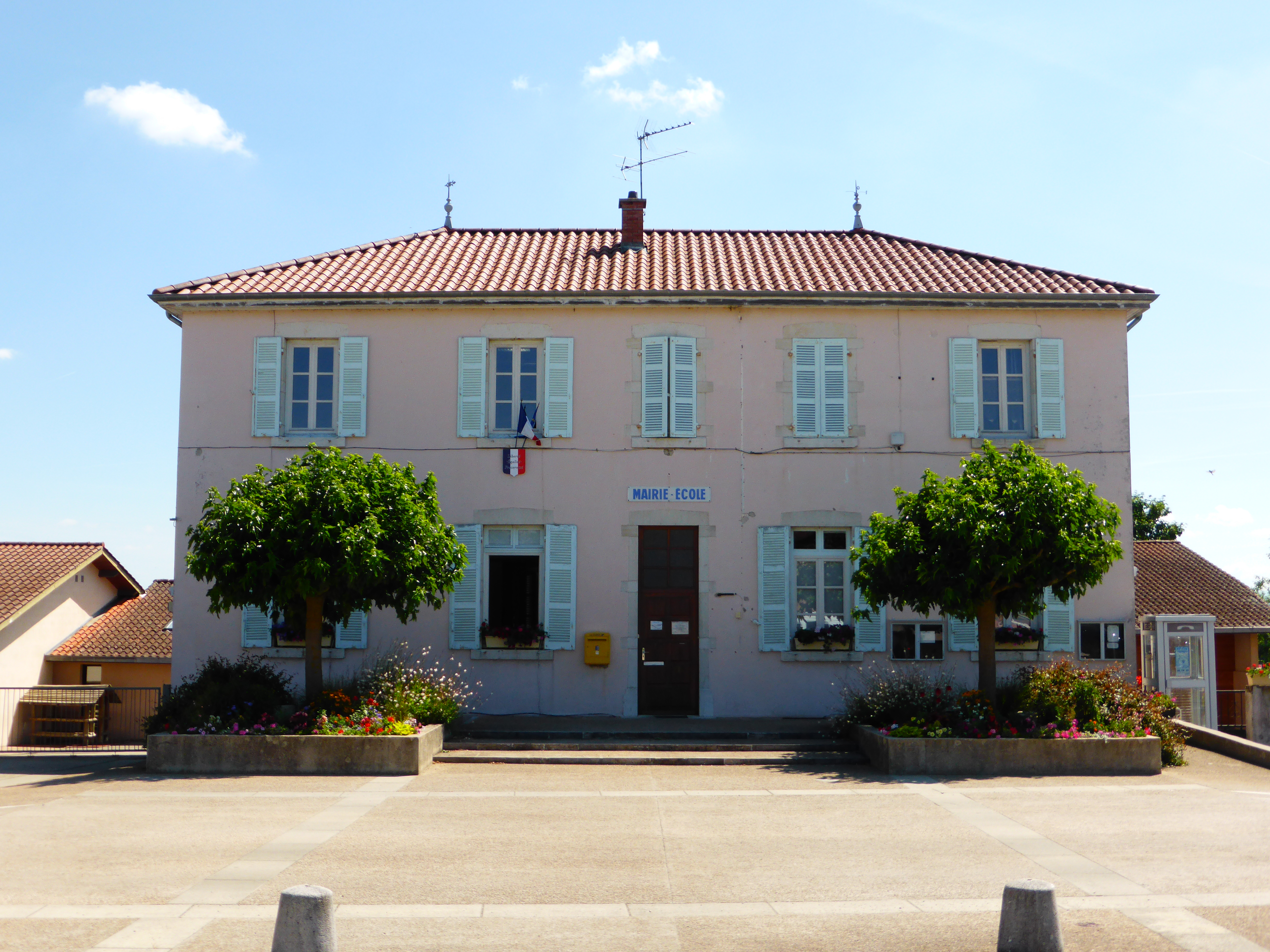
- Town hall
- Location of Saint-Rémy
- Location within France Location within Auvergne-Rhône-Alpes
- Coordinates: 46°11′24″N 5°10′09″E
- Country: France
- Region: Auvergne-Rhône-Alpes
- Department: Ain
- Arrondissement: Bourg-en-Bresse
- Canton: Bourg-en-Bresse-2
- Intercommunality: CA Bassin de Bourg-en-Bresse

Government
  - Mayor (2026–32): Christophe Mallet
- Area^{1}: 7.38 km^{2} (2.85 sq mi)
- Highest elevation: 265 m (869 ft)
- Lowest elevation: 216 m (709 ft)
- Population (2023): 915
  - Density: 124/km^{2} (321/sq mi)
- Time zone: UTC+01:00 (CET)
  - Summer (DST): UTC+02:00 (CEST)
- INSEE/Postal code: 01385 /01310
- ^{1} French Land Register data, which excludes lakes, ponds, glaciers > 1 km^{2} (0.386 sq mi or 247 acres) and river estuaries.

Saint-Rémy (French pronunciation: [sɛ̃ ʁemi]) is a commune in the Ain department in eastern France.

== Geography ==
The Veyle river flows north through the middle of the commune.

== Population ==
Historical population
Year	Pop.	±% p.a.
1968	302	—
1975	432	+5.25%
1982	551	+3.54%
1990	668	+2.44%
1999	813	+2.21%
2007	823	+0.15%
2012	964	+3.21%
2017	994	+0.61%
2023	915	−1.37%
Source: INSEE

== See also ==
- Communes of the Ain department
