= Péronnas =

Commune in Auvergne-Rhône-Alpes, France

- Commune
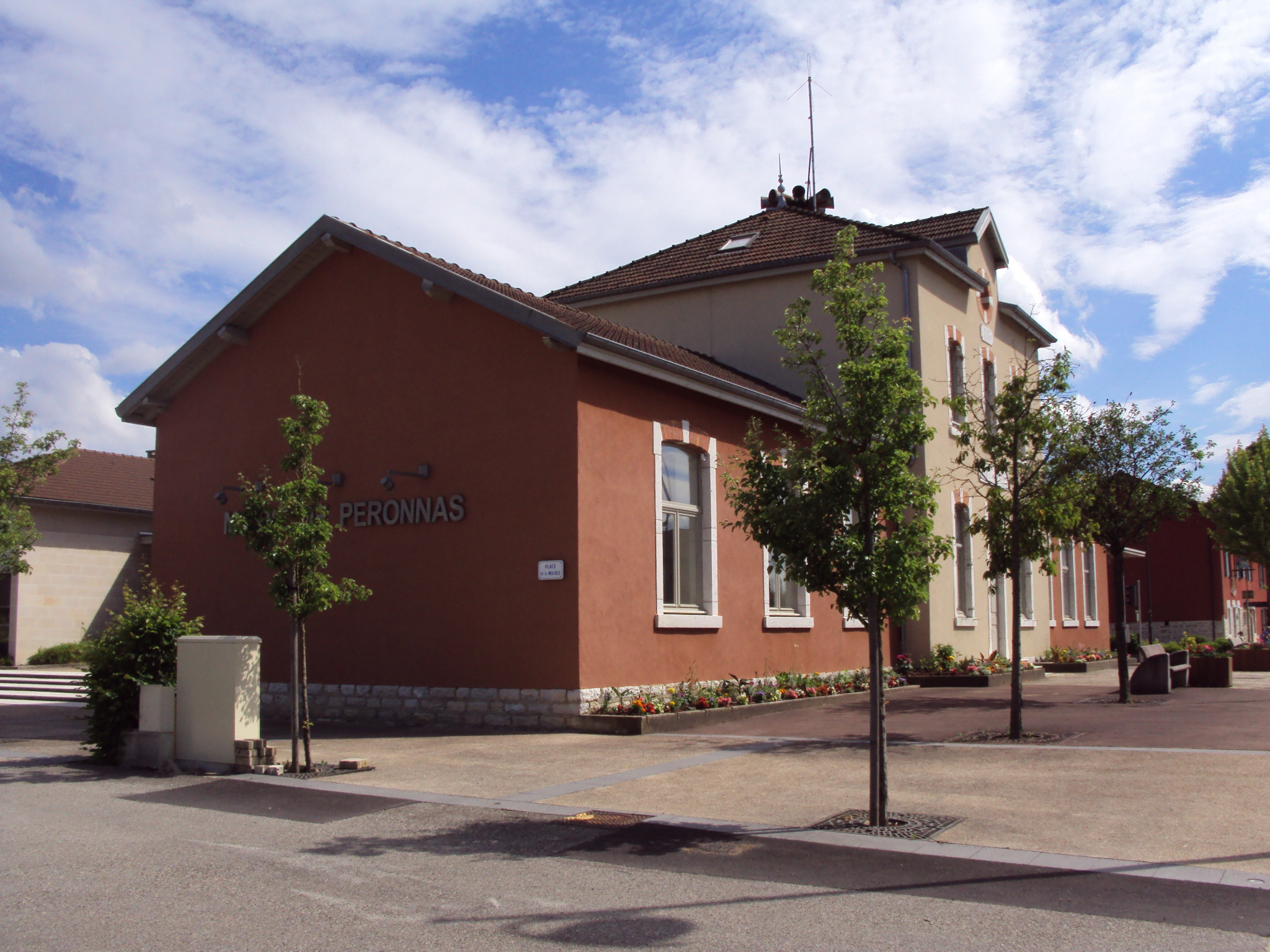
- Town hall

- Coat of arms
- Location of Péronnas
- Location within France Location within Auvergne-Rhône-Alpes
- Coordinates: 46°10′46″N 5°12′12″E
- Country: France
- Region: Auvergne-Rhône-Alpes
- Department: Ain
- Arrondissement: Bourg-en-Bresse
- Canton: Bourg-en-Bresse-2
- Intercommunality: CA Bassin de Bourg-en-Bresse

Government
  - Mayor (2026–32): Hélène Cédileau
- Area^{1}: 17.59 km^{2} (6.79 sq mi)
- Elevation: 240 m (790 ft)
- Highest elevation: 277 m (909 ft)
- Lowest elevation: 223 m (732 ft)
- Population (2023): 6,444
  - Density: 366.3/km^{2} (948.8/sq mi)
- Time zone: UTC+01:00 (CET)
  - Summer (DST): UTC+02:00 (CEST)
- INSEE/Postal code: 01289 /01960
- ^{1} French Land Register data, which excludes lakes, ponds, glaciers > 1 km^{2} (0.386 sq mi or 247 acres) and river estuaries.

Péronnas (French pronunciation: [peʁɔna]) is a commune in the Ain department in the Auvergne-Rhône-Alpes region in eastern France.

== Geography ==
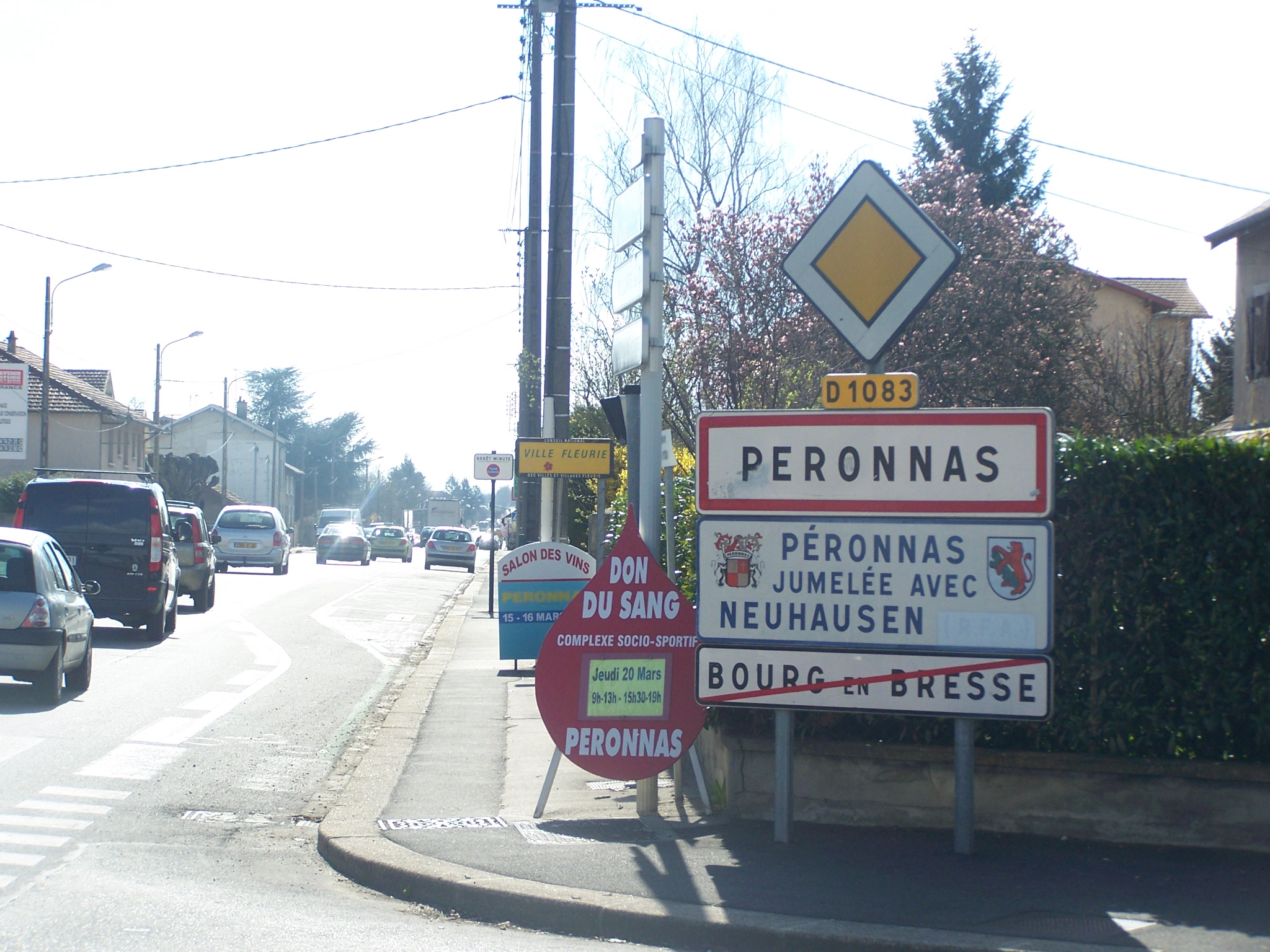
Entrance to the city

The Veyle forms part of the commune's western border.

== Population ==
Historical population
Year	Pop.	±% p.a.
1968	2,272	—
1975	3,223	+5.12%
1982	4,575	+5.13%
1990	5,352	+1.98%
1999	5,534	+0.37%
2007	6,147	+1.32%
2012	6,095	−0.17%
2017	6,385	+0.93%
2023	6,444	+0.15%
Source: INSEE

== Sport and leisure ==
Péronnas has a football club FC Bourg-Péronnas who play at the Stade Municipal de Péronnas. They are currently playing in the Ligue 2, the second tier of French football.

== See also ==
- Communes of the Ain department
