= Servas, Ain =

Commune in Auvergne-Rhône-Alpes, France

Servas
- Commune
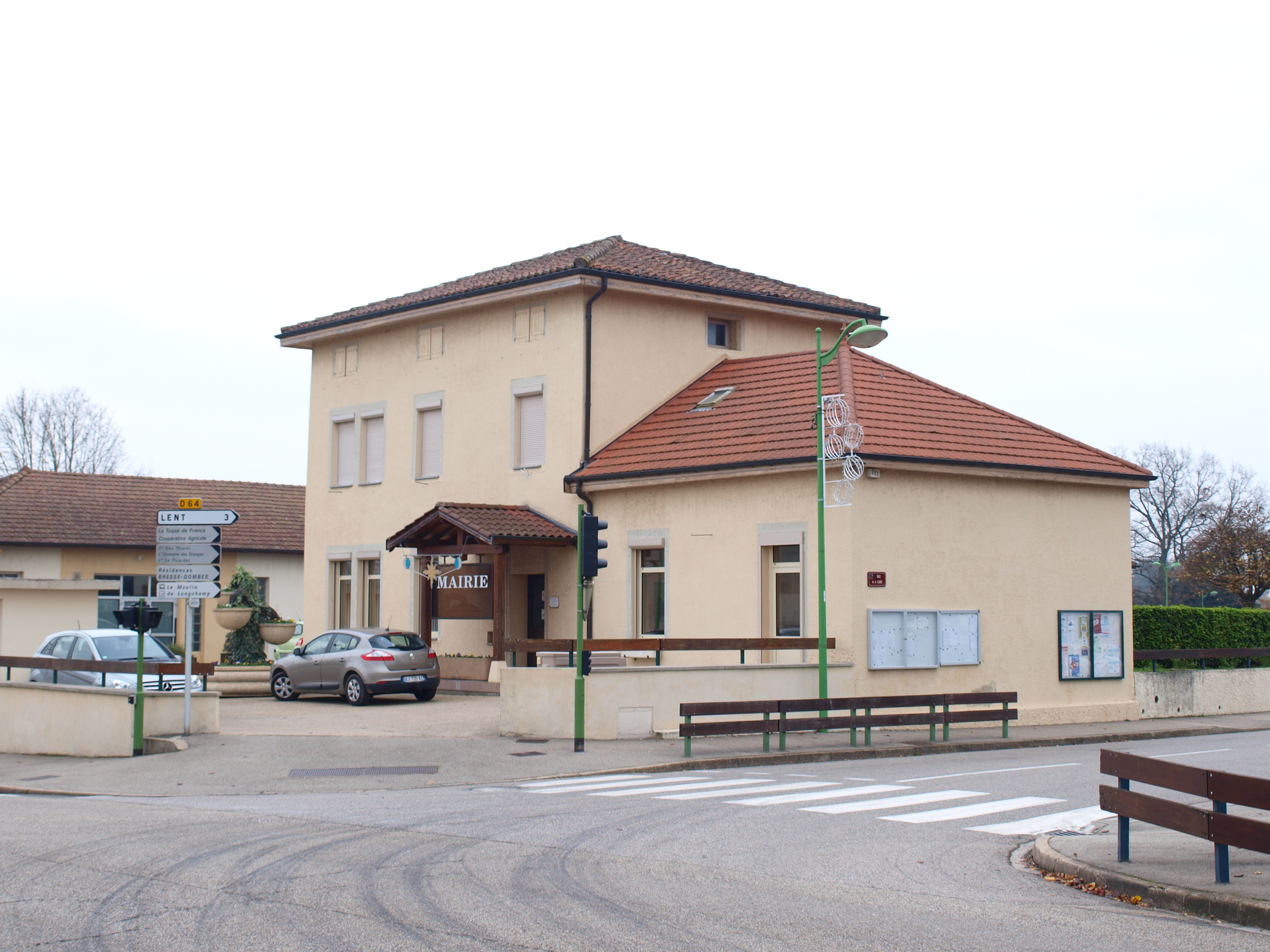
- Town hall

- Coat of arms
- Location of Servas
- Location within France Location within Auvergne-Rhône-Alpes
- Coordinates: 46°08′00″N 5°10′00″E
- Country: France
- Region: Auvergne-Rhône-Alpes
- Department: Ain
- Arrondissement: Bourg-en-Bresse
- Canton: Ceyzériat
- Intercommunality: CA Bassin de Bourg-en-Bresse

Government
  - Mayor (2026–32): Serge Guérin
- Area^{1}: 13.05 km^{2} (5.04 sq mi)
- Highest elevation: 279 m (915 ft)
- Lowest elevation: 234 m (768 ft)
- Population (2023): 1,286
  - Density: 98.54/km^{2} (255.2/sq mi)
- Time zone: UTC+01:00 (CET)
  - Summer (DST): UTC+02:00 (CEST)
- INSEE/Postal code: 01405 /01960
- ^{1} French Land Register data, which excludes lakes, ponds, glaciers > 1 km^{2} (0.386 sq mi or 247 acres) and river estuaries.

Servas (Arpitan: Sèrva) is a commune in the Ain department in eastern France.

== Geography ==
The Veyle flows northwest through the northeastern part of the commune.

== Population ==
Historical population
Year	Pop.	±% p.a.
1968	439	—
1975	539	+2.98%
1982	818	+6.14%
1990	879	+0.90%
1999	914	+0.43%
2007	1,160	+3.02%
2012	1,192	+0.55%
2017	1,247	+0.91%
2023	1,286	+0.51%
Source: INSEE

== See also ==
- Communes of the Ain department
- Dombes
