= Lent, Ain =

Commune in Auvergne-Rhône-Alpes, France

Lent
- Commune
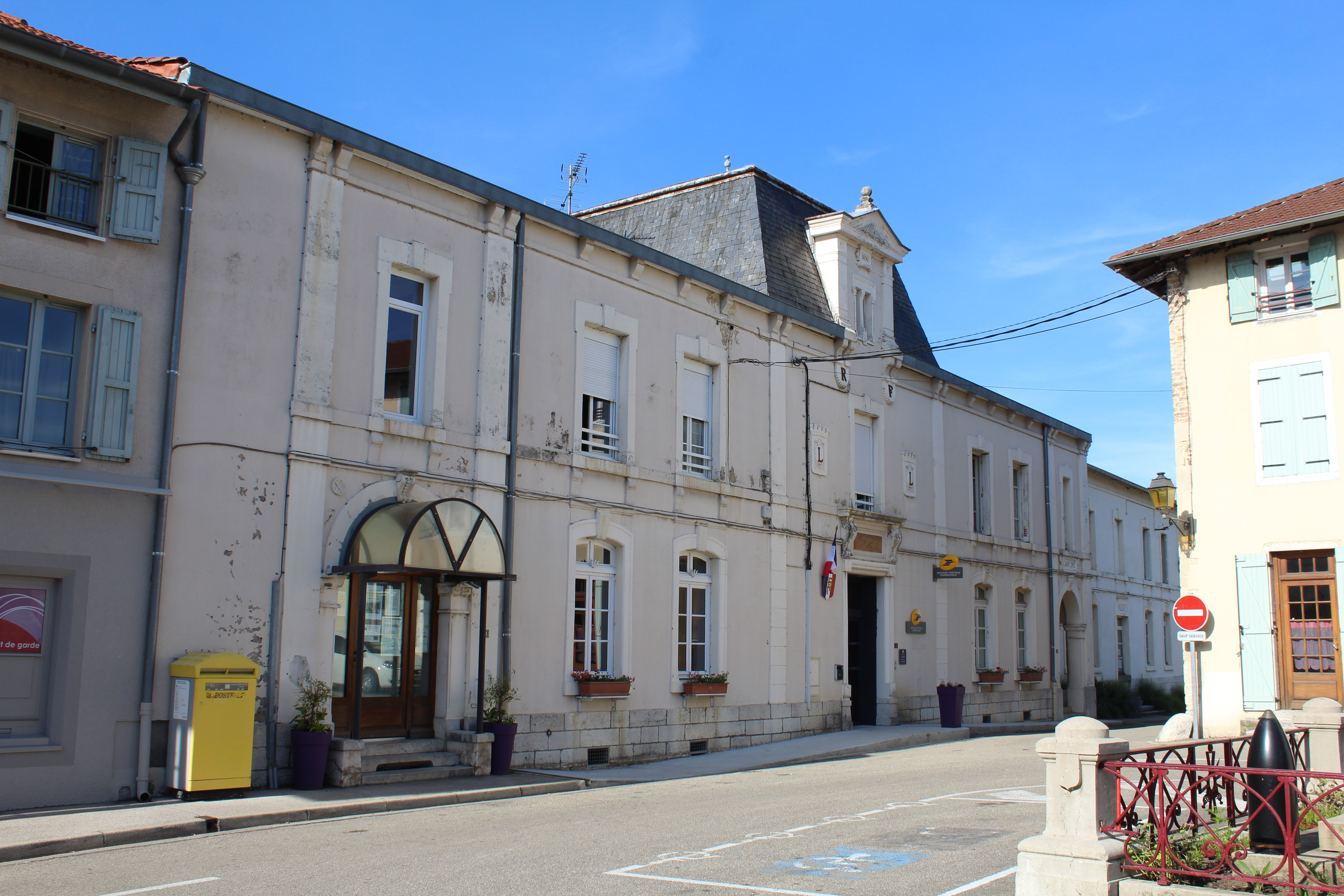
- Town hall

- Coat of arms
- Location of Lent
- Location within France Location within Auvergne-Rhône-Alpes
- Coordinates: 46°07′13″N 5°11′47″E
- Country: France
- Region: Auvergne-Rhône-Alpes
- Department: Ain
- Arrondissement: Bourg-en-Bresse
- Canton: Ceyzériat
- Intercommunality: CA Bassin de Bourg-en-Bresse

Government
  - Mayor (2026–32): Yves Cristin
- Area^{1}: 31.48 km^{2} (12.15 sq mi)
- Elevation: 250 m (820 ft)
- Highest elevation: 296 m (971 ft)
- Lowest elevation: 240 m (790 ft)
- Population (2023): 1,512
  - Density: 48.03/km^{2} (124.4/sq mi)
- Time zone: UTC+01:00 (CET)
  - Summer (DST): UTC+02:00 (CEST)
- INSEE/Postal code: 01211 /01240
- ^{1} French Land Register data, which excludes lakes, ponds, glaciers > 1 km^{2} (0.386 sq mi or 247 acres) and river estuaries.

Lent (French pronunciation: [lɑ̃]) is a commune in the Ain department in eastern France.

== Geography ==
The Veyle flows north through the middle of the commune.

== Population ==
Historical population
Year	Pop.	±% p.a.
1968	778	—
1975	801	+0.42%
1982	976	+2.86%
1990	1,043	+0.83%
1999	1,145	+1.04%
2007	1,253	+1.13%
2012	1,385	+2.02%
2017	1,405	+0.29%
2023	1,512	+1.23%
Source: INSEE

== See also ==
- Dombes
- Communes of the Ain department
